= Elias Dummer =

Canadian musician, songwriter, and writer

Elias Elton Dummer (born March 3, 1983) is a Canadian musician, songwriter, and writer based in Tennessee. Elias was the principal songwriter, founding member, lead singer, and pianist in the contemporary Christian band the City Harmonic, from 2009 until 2017, and released his first solo music a decade since the creation of the band in 2019.

== Early life and education ==
Dummer was born and raised in Hamilton, Ontario. He attended Westmount High School.

== Career ==
Dummer started The City Harmonic with guitarist Aaron Powell, bassist Eric Fusilier, and drummer Joshua Vanderlaan in 2009 after they served together as the house worship band for an inter-denominational event for students focused on "worship and mission" called CrossCulture. The band was then commissioned by the TrueCity movement of churches in Hamilton, Ontario. The band released an EP, Introducing the City Harmonic in 2010.

Dummer's hit song "Manifesto" became the walkup song for baseball player Seth Smith, and served as the theme song for 2011's National Day of Prayer, in addition to being performed live at Passion 2013 by Charlie Hall.

In 2015, Dummer co-produced We Are The City Harmonic, a documentary about the social impact of churches working together in Hamilton, with Jesse Hunt and Eric Fusilier.

The City Harmonic disbanded in 2017. Dummer and his family moved to Tennessee; after first releasing a series of singles to streaming platforms beginning in November 2018, Dummer released his debut album as solo artist, The Work Vol. 1, on February 8, 2019; his debut single "Enough" received sufficient radio play to appear for 26 weeks on the Billboard Hot Christian Songs chart. In 2020, "Expectation" appeared on iTunes and Apple Music charts in more than 30 countries around the world.

Dummer released his sophomore album The Work, Vol. 2, in July, 2022, which was co-produced by Dummer and Brent Milligan and featured multiple collaborators including JJ Heller, Citizens, Land of Color, and Sandra McCracken. Production began in 2020, requiring them to accomplish certain elements remotely, including a choir crowd-sourced from singers across the world.

The album was included in multiple lists naming the best Christian music albums of 2022, including those from The Gospel Coalition, JesusWired, UTR Media.

As of September 2022, Dummer's songs have accumulated over 100 million streams.

== Songwriting ==
Dummer's career began as a songwriter, with songs like "Honestly" and "Do You Hear The Sound" released under Spring Hill Worship in 2005. With his band Elias, he wrote "Faithful Forever" winning a Covenant Award in 2008. In addition to his releases as a solo artist, Elias, and with The City Harmonic, Dummer has contributed to a number of projects for other artists. Dummer has written with Building 429, Newsong, Zealand Worship, Big Daddy Weave, Dan Bremnes, and Todd Smith.

== Writing ==
Dummer has contributed to Huffington Post and ChurchLeaders.com on faith and culture. In 2023, Dummer also co-founded and contributed to a research project called Worship Leader Research in conjunction with Baylor University, Belmont University, and Southern Wesleyan University. The findings of this research have been featured by Christianity Today, The Washington Post, Sing! — The Center for Congregational Song, The Roys Report, and The Holy Post.

== Recognition ==
As a solo artist and as the founding member of The City Harmonic, Dummer has received a Juno Award (and 2 additional nominations), 15 Covenant Awards (with 26 more nominations), and a Dove Awards nomination.

In September 2023, Dummer was featured in the Hearn Innovator Series at Baylor University.

== Personal life ==
Dummer and his wife Meaghan have five children and live in Hamilton, Ontario, Canada after living near Nashville for almost ten years. Together with Travis Garner, they helped to plant The Village Nashville in 2016, a church in Nolensville, Tennessee.

== Business ==
In addition to music, Elias Dummer has multiple successful businesses, including Rockfirm Marketing, Crown & Press, and Square Foot Show.

== Discography ==
=== As frontman in The City Harmonic ===
Year	Album	Peak Chart Position	Weeks
2011	Introducing The City Harmonic (EP)	26 Billboard Top Christian Albums	18
2011	I Have a Dream (It Feels Like Home)	34 Billboard Top Christian Albums	2
2013	Heart	24 Billboard Top Christian Albums	3
2015	We Are	40 Billboard Top Christian Albums	
2017	Benediction (Live)		

=== Singles with The City Harmonic ===
Year	Single	Peak Chart Positions	Weeks	Album
2011	"Manifesto"	24 Billboard Christian Songs; 19 Billboard Hot Christian Songs; 15 Billboard Christian Song Sales	20; 30	Introducing The City Harmonic
2011	"Mountaintop"	28 Billboard Christian Songs	4	I Have a Dream (It Feels Like Home)
2011	"I Have a Dream (It Feels Like Home)"	5 Billboard Hot Christian Songs	16	I Have a Dream (It Feels Like Home)
2012	"Mountaintop"	27 Billboard Hot Christian Songs	12	I Have A Dream (It Feels Like Home)
2013	"Holy (Wedding Day)"	36 Billboard Hot Christian Songs	8	I Have a Dream (It Feels Like Home)
2014	"Praise the Lord"	46 Billboard Christian Airplay	6	Heart

=== Solo albums ===
- The Work Vol. 1 (2019) February 8, 2019

Year	Album	Peak Chart Position	Weeks
2019	The Work Vol. 1	10 Billboard Heatseekers	1
2022	The Work Vol. 2		

=== Singles as a Solo Artist ===
Year	Single	Peak Chart Position	Weeks	Album
2019	"Enough"	25 Billboard Christian Airplay	26	The Work Vol. 1
2019	"Enough"	42 Billboard Hot Christian Songs	7	The Work Vol. 1
2022	"The Gospel is Rest (feat. Land of Color)"			The Work Vol. 2
2022	"Kyrie Eleison (feat. Citizens)"			The Work Vol. 2
2022	"Carry (feat. JJ Heller)"			The Work Vol. 2
2022	"See Clearly" (feat. Sandra McCracken)			The Work Vol. 2
2022	"We're Here Because You're Here"			The Work Vol. 2
2024	"Manifesto"			Manifesto

== Awards ==
=== GMA Canada Covenant Awards ===
2023	Award	Result
2008	Modern Worship Song of the Year: "Faithful Forever"	Won
2019	Breakthrough Artist of the Year	Won
2019	Song of the Year	Nominated
2019	Male Vocalist of the Year	Nominated
2019	Artist of the Year	Nominated
2019	Praise & Worship Album of the Year	Nominated
2019	Album of the Year	Nominated
2019	Praise & Worship Song of the Year	Nominated
2023	Rock Artist of the Year	Won
2023	Male Vocalist of the Year	Won
2023	Artist of the Year	Nominated
2023	Album of the Year	Nominated
