= Wherever I Go (Dan Bremnes album) =

2019 album by Dan Bremnes

Wherever I Go EP

EP by Dan Bremnes
- Released: September 7, 2018
- Genres: Contemporary Christian music, worship, folk rock
- Label: Bremnes Ventures Inc.
- Producers: Colin Munroe, Michael Wise

Dan Bremnes chronology
Where the Light Is (2015)	Wherever I Go EP (2018)	Wherever I Go (album) (2019)

Wherever I Go

Studio album by Dan Bremnes
- Released: April 5, 2019
- Genres: Contemporary Christian music, worship, folk rock
- Length: 41:57
- Label: Word Records

Dan Bremnes chronology
Wherever I Go EP (2018)	Wherever I Go (2019)	Wherever I Go: Acoustic Sessions (2020)

Wherever I Go Acoustic Sessions

Studio album by Dan Bremnes
- Released: July 17, 2020
- Genres: Contemporary Christian music, worship, folk rock
- Length: 34:35
- Label: Curb / Word Entertainment

Dan Bremnes chronology
Wherever I Go (album) (2019)	Wherever I Go Acoustic Sessions (2020)

Wherever I Go is the third studio album by Dan Bremnes released on April 5, 2019 by Word Records as a CD and digital download. It was preceded by a similarly titled EP, Wherever I Go EP released independently on September 7, 2018 under the label Bremnes Ventures Inc. The 14-track album includes the 7 tracks on the EP in the same order and an additional 7 new tracks. All the songs are written or co-written by Bremnes.

On July 17, 2020, he released an acoustic version as an EP with Curb Records / Word Entertainment as Wherever I Go: Acoustic Sessions available as a CD, or digital download and streaming. Two songs, "Up Again" and "Wherever I Go" have both charted in the top 20 of the Hot Christian Songs chart. "Wherever I Go" music video was shot in 8 days around the world and filmed in 7 countries in an attempt to set a world record. He released a vlog series documenting the project.

== Chart performance ==
The EP version has charted on the U.S. Top Christian Albums chart reaching number 40 as well as on the U.S. Top Heatseekers album chart reaching number 10. Three tracks from the EP, "Going Together", "Wherever I Go" and "Up Again" were released as singles in 2018 with "Up Again" peaking at #16 on Hot Christian Songs chart and "Wherever I Go" peaking at #19 on the same chart. Both songs also appeared on the Christian Airplay peaking at #12 and #12 respectively and on Christian Hot AC/Christian chart peaking at 14 and 11 respectively. With the release of the album, three more tracks were released as singles, "Thunder", "Weakness" and "Searching For Something". The singles were released in connection with the EP and subsequent album release.

== Critical reception ==
Acoustic Sessions release in 2020 got special praise. Awarding the album four stars for 365 Days Of Inspiring Music, Jonathan Andre says "...the album is a must have if you want to listen to some of Dan's most recent songs in a whole new light, as we see that often during times of uncertainty and crisis, acoustic songs that often strip away the instrumentation and highlight the lyrics, are often sought after in a time like this, as if were searching for hope and meaning in this crazy time." Kelly Meade of Today's Christian Entertainment scored the album 4/5 and said "I've always enjoyed getting to hear different versions and remixes of songs, this is especially true for acoustic versions. Something about taking away a lot of the production and just having one or a few instruments not only showcases the artist talent, but in many cases it adds to the song by giving the audience a chance to connect even more to the message being presented in the words. Selena Shulz of New Release Today says "I realized that this record holds so much more than a voice and a guitar. its a beautiful melody of a keyboard, light drums, a soulful voice, and, of course the guitar chords. As for the guitar itself, I loved how the chords carried the songs, but individual notes accentuated the most important lyrics.".

== Track lists ==
=== Wherever I Go EP ===
1. "Wherever You Go"
2. "How You Love Me"
3. "Up Again"
4. "Speak to Me"
5. "Going Together"
6. "The Way"
7. "It Would Have Been Enough"

=== Wherever I Go ===
No.	Title	Length
1.	"Wherever I Go"	2:58
2.	"How You Love Me"	3:19
3.	"Up Again"	2:41
4.	"Speak to Me"	3:11
5.	"Going Together"	2:58
6.	"The Way"	3:04
7.	"It Would Have Been Enough"	3:25
8.	"Thunder"	2:33
9.	"Let That Go"	3:02
10.	"Weakness"	2:38
11.	"Thankful"	2:50
12.	"Scars"	2:32
13.	"Searching for Something"	3:32
14.	"Get There Soon"	3:14
Total length:		41:57

=== Wherever I Go (Acoustic Sessions) ===
No.	Title	Writer(s)	Length
1.	"Wherever I Go (Acoustic)"	Dan Bremnes, Bryan Fowler	3:32
2.	"Thunder (Acoustic)"	Bremnes, Colin Munroe, Jordan Frye	3:03
3.	"Weakness (Acoustic)" (feat. Mike Donehey)	Bremnes, Ed Cash, Scott Cash, Garcia, Glover	2:47
4.	"Searching for Something (Acoustic)" (with Stars Go Dim)	Bremnes, Michael Wise, Nathan Ferraro	3:12
5.	"The Way (Acoustic)"	Bremnes, Bryan Fowler	3:07
6.	"How You Love Me (Acoustic)"	Bremnes, Bryan Fowler	3:20
7.	"Speak to Me (Acoustic)"	Bremnes, Elias Dummer	3:51
8.	"Going Together (Acoustic)" (feat. Britt Bremnes)	Bremnes, Bryan Fowler, Ryan Stevenson	3:13
9.	"Up Again (Acoustic Mix)" (with Love & The Outcome)	Bremnes, Michael Wise, David Charles Fischer	3:33
10.	"Beautiful (Acoustic)" (with Meredith Andrews)	Bremnes, Ben Glover, David Garcia, Ed Cash, Scott Cash	3:56
Total length:			34:35

== Charts ==
Chart (2015)	Peak position
US Top Christian Albums (Billboard)	40
US Christian Heatseekers Albums (Billboard)	10
