= George Abbott (politician) =

Canadian politician

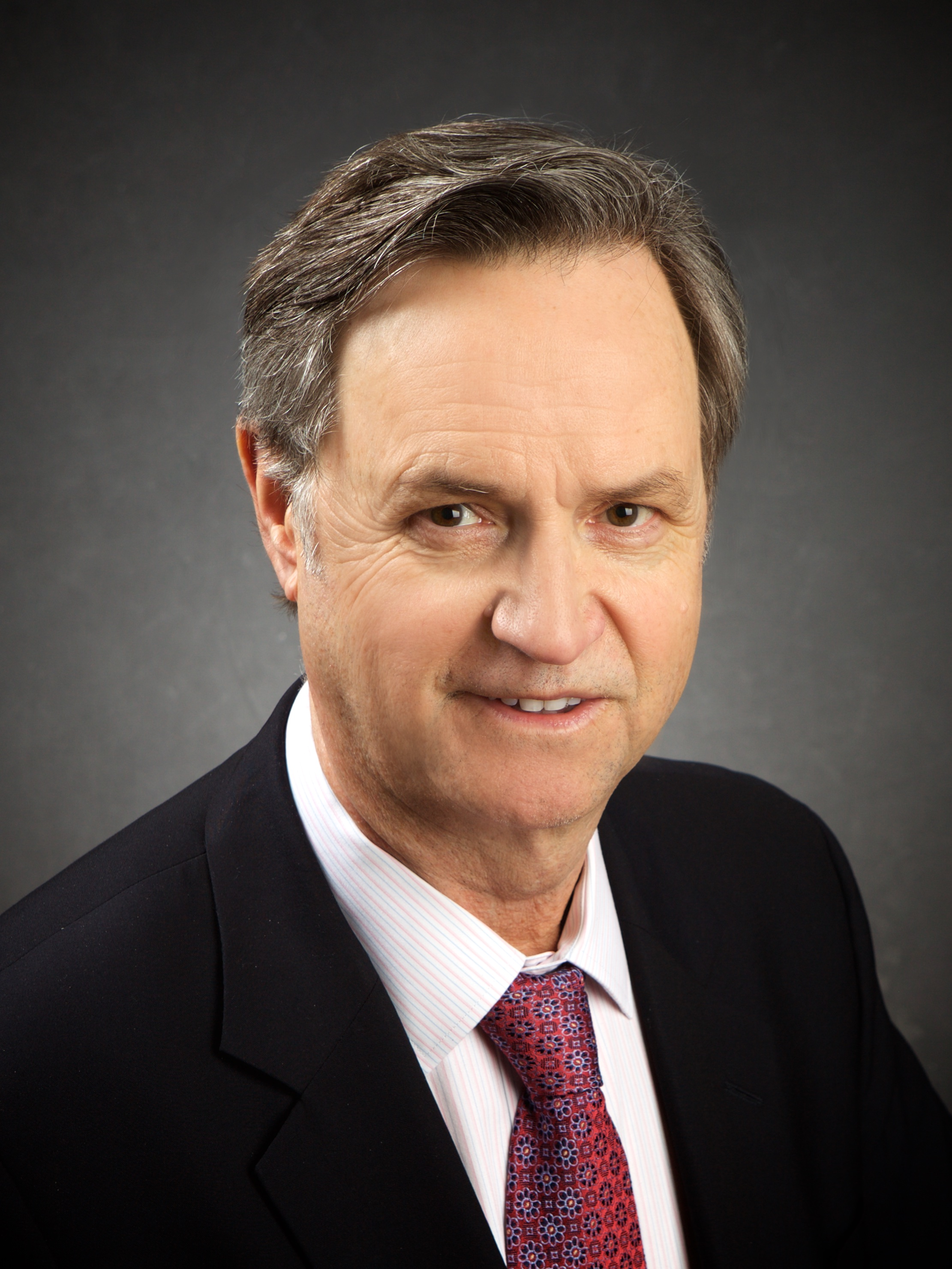

Member of the British Columbia Legislative Assembly for Shuswap
- In office May 28, 1996 – May 14, 2013
- Preceded by: Shannon O'Neill
- Succeeded by: Greg Kyllo

Minister of Community, Aboriginal and Women’s Services of British Columbia
- In office June 5, 2001 – January 26, 2004
- Premier: Gordon Campbell
- Preceded by: Jenny Kwan (Community Development, Cooperatives and Volunteers), David Zirnhelt (Aboriginal Affairs)
- Succeeded by: Murray Coell

Minister of Sustainable Resource Management of British Columbia
- In office January 26, 2004 – June 16, 2005
- Premier: Gordon Campbell
- Preceded by: Stan Hagen
- Succeeded by: Position abolished

Minister of Health of British Columbia Minister of Health Services (2008–2009)
- In office June 16, 2005 – June 10, 2009
- Premier: Gordon Campbell
- Preceded by: Shirley Bond
- Succeeded by: Kevin Falcon

Minister of Aboriginal Relations and Reconciliation of British Columbia
- In office June 10, 2009 – October 25, 2010
- Premier: Gordon Campbell
- Preceded by: Michael de Jong
- Succeeded by: Barry Penner

Minister of Education of British Columbia
- In office October 25, 2010 – November 25, 2010
- Premier: Gordon Campbell
- Preceded by: Margaret MacDiarmid
- Succeeded by: Margaret MacDiarmid
- In office March 14, 2011 – September 5, 2012
- Premier: Christy Clark
- Preceded by: Margaret MacDiarmid
- Succeeded by: Don McRae

Personal details
- Born: November 17, 1952 (age 73) Enderby, British Columbia
- Party: BC Liberal
- Spouse: Lesley Abbott
- Education: University of British Columbia; University of Victoria
- Occupation: farmer; political science instructor

George Abbott (born November 17, 1952) is a former politician and cabinet minister for the Canadian province of British Columbia. He was a member of the Legislative Assembly of British Columbia, representing the riding of Shuswap from 1996 to 2013. As part of the British Columbia Liberal Party caucus, he served in several cabinet posts under premiers Gordon Campbell and Christy Clark, and ran for party leadership in 2011.

== Early life and career ==
Born in Enderby, Abbott grew up in the Shuswap community of Sicamous and attended the Okanagan College's Salmon Arm campus before transferring to the University of British Columbia, where he received his Bachelor of Arts. He then enrolled as a graduate student at the University of Victoria (UVic), completed an intern program at the provincial legislature and graduated with a Master of Arts in political science in 1978.

After graduation, he returned to Sicamous to help run the family berry farm. He was also elected to the board of the Columbia-Shuswap Regional District in 1980, serving as its chair at one point, and returned to the Okanagan College's Salmon Arm campus to work as a political science instructor.

He and his wife Lesley have three children; he was also involved in coaching minor hockey.

== Provincial politics ==
=== Opposition and Campbell ministry ===
Abbott ran for the BC Liberals in the 1996 provincial election, and was elected member of the Legislative Assembly (MLA) for Shuswap with less than 35% of the vote. While the Liberals were in opposition, Abbott served as municipal affairs and forests critic and deputy house leader.

He was re-elected in that riding in the 2001 election, and was appointed Minister of Community, Aboriginal and Women's Services that June. As minister, Abbott worked with the Union of BC Municipalities (UBCM) to pass the Community Charter. He was later awarded a lifetime membership in UBCM for his work on the file.

Abbott became Minister of Sustainable Resource Management on January 26, 2004. In this role, he worked with industry, environmental, and First Nations groups to complete the Great Bear Rainforest agreement which included a move to ecosystem-based management. As a result of his work on this file, Abbott was the only BC Liberal Candidate endorsed by the Conservation Voters of BC in the 2005 election.

After the 2005 election, Abbot was appointed Minister of Health. He partnered with the BC Medical Association to introduce Electronic Health Records to BC. Abbott enshrined the five principles of the Canada Health Act, plus a sixth – the principle of sustainability – in provincial law. He also pushed for innovation in the health system and introduced the $100-million Health Innovation Fund, which funded pilot projects to reduce wait times in emergency rooms and for elective surgeries.

Following the 2009 election, he became Minister of Aboriginal Relations and Reconciliation and government deputy house leader on June 10, 2009. As minister, Abbott worked with First Nations leaders to designate the Salish Sea and Haida Gwaii, and signed a final agreement with the Yale First Nation. He served in these roles until October 25, 2010, when he was named Minister of Education.

=== Campaign for Liberal leadership ===
On November 25, 2010, George Abbott announced he was running for the leadership of the BC Liberal Party to succeed Gordon Campbell, and resigned his cabinet post. During the campaign he stated he would move the date of the harmonized sales tax referendum from September 24, 2011, to no later than June 24 of that year, and increase the minimum wage. He called for a review or the $6 million payment made for expenses incurred by convicted Liberal aides Robert Virk and David Basi in association with the BC Rail trial. However, he refused to call for a full public inquiry in the alleged scandal involving allegations of bribes to Liberal party insiders. He placed third in the leadership election, which was won by Christy Clark.

=== Clark ministry ===
On March 14, 2011, Abbott was appointed minister of education, as a part of Clark's initial cabinet.

On August 30, 2012, Abbott announced he would not be running in the 2013 election. He remained education minister until September 5, 2012.

== Post-politics ==
In 2013, Abbott re-enrolled at the University of Victoria, where he began writing a thesis on the impact of the federal–provincial division of powers on aboriginal policy. On November 22, 2013, it was announced that Abbott would teach a course on BC's political economy at UVic. He received his PhD in 2019.

In 2015, Premier Clark and her cabinet vetoed the appointment of Abbott to be Chief Treaty Commissioner of BC Treaty Commission due to her government aiming to reform the treaty process. Abbott had been working on transition with the departing commission chief and his removal was criticized by First Nations. In 2015, Abbott revealed that he had let his party membership lapse and considered himself non-partisan. He stressed that it was not a decision made by any "single thing", but several factors that lead him to be unhappy with the party.

== Election results ==
BC General Election 2009: Shuswap
Party	Candidate	Votes	%	±	Expenditures
Liberal	George Abbott	10,764	46.62%		$92,432
NDP	Steve Gunner	7,051	30.54%		$41,011
Green	Michel Saab	2,539	11.00%	–	$7,149
Conservative	Beryl Ludwig	2,374	10.28%		$9,378
Marijuana	Chris Emery	361	1.56%		$550
Total valid votes		23,089	100%		
Total rejected ballots		79	0.34%		
Turnout		23,168	56.82%		

2005 British Columbia general election: Shuswap
Party	Candidate	Votes	%	Expenditures
Liberal	George Abbott	11,024	46.96	$89,183
New Democratic	Calvin Ross White	8,281	35.27	$60,432
Conservative	Beryl Ludwig	2,330	9.92	$5,715
Green	Barbara Westerman	1,394	5.94	$1,788
Marijuana	Chris Emery	356	1.52	$100
Bloc	Paddy Roberts	50	0.21	$897
Patriot	Andrew Nicholas Hokhold	42	0.18	$100
Total valid votes		23,477	100.00	
Total rejected ballots		93	0.40	
Turnout		23,570	64.34	

2001 British Columbia general election: Shuswap
Party	Candidate	Votes	%	Expenditures
Liberal	George Abbott	12,950	56.27%	$46,736
NDP	Wayne Fowler	3,788	16.46%	$12,950
Unity	Al Thiessen	2,857	12.41%	$7,793
Green	Larissa Lutjen	2,423	10.53%	$892
Marijuana	Paddy Roberts	835	3.63%	$919
No Affiliation	Jeanette (N.O.) McLennan	119	0.52%	$100
Central	Scott Yee	41	0.18%	$6
Total valid votes		23,013	100.00%	
Total rejected ballots		65	0.28%	
Turnout		23,078	72.01%	

BC General Election 1996: Shuswap
Party	Candidate	Votes	%	±	Expenditures
Liberal	George Abbott	8,596	34.55%		$35,489
NDP	Calvin White	7,869	31.63%		$37,552
Reform	Colin Mayes	5,356	22.58%		$21,375
Progressive Democrat	Bev Torrens	1,325	5.33%	–	$4,193
No Affiliation	Gordon Campbell	810	3.26%		
Green	Paul Stephen De Felice	237	0.95%	–	$100
Social Credit	Robert Goss	221	0.89%	–	$1,363
Independent	Merv Ritchie	204	0.82%		$505
Total valid votes		24,879	100.00%		
Total rejected ballots		200	0.80%		
Turnout		25,079	72.79%		
