= Where the Light Is =

Where the Light Is may refer to:

- Where the Light Is (John Mayer album)
- Where the Light Is (Dan Bremnes album)
- Where the Light Is (EP), an EP by Dan Bremnes
- Where the Light Is, a 2019 album by Surfaces
