= He Knows (disambiguation) =

"He Knows" is a 2024 song by American singer Camila Cabello featuring American singer and rapper Lil Nas X.

He Knows may also refer to:

== Other songs ==
- "He Knows", by Briana Marela from Call It Love, 2017
- "He Knows", by Dan Bremnes from Where the Light Is (Dan Bremnes album), 2015, and Where the Light Is (EP), 2015
- "He Knows", by Jeremy Camp from I Will Follow, 2015
- "He Knows", by Karen Clark Sheard featuring Dorinda Clark-Cole from All in One, 2010
- "He Knows", by The Black Dog from Music for Real Airports, 2010
- "He Knows", by The Futureheads from The Futureheads, 2004
- "He Knows", by Walter Hawkins featuring Walter Redmond from Love Alive IV, 1990
- "He Knows", by Wire from Red Barked Tree, 2010, and 10:20, 2020
- "He Knows", by Charles, co-written by Charles, Ravvel and Wouter Hardy, 2021
- "He Knows", by Gisele MacKenzie, 1957
- "He Knows", by Grouper, 2006
- "He Knows", by Lillian Tait Sheldon

== Other works ==
- He Knows, a La Luna Sangre episode, 2017
- He Knows, by Stuart Creque, nominated by Octocon

== See also ==
- I Know (disambiguation)
- She Knows (disambiguation)
- They Know (disambiguation)
