= Salmon Arm-Shuswap =

Provincial electoral district in British Columbia, Canada

British Columbia electoral district
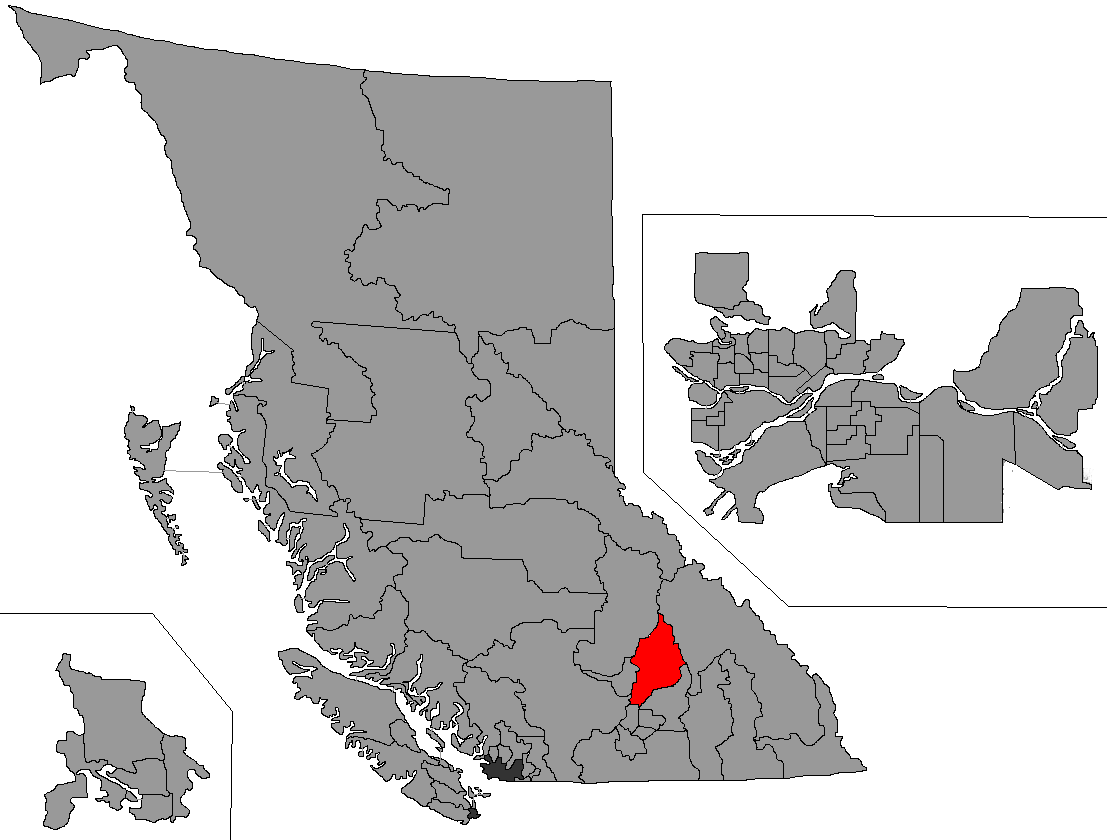

Provincial electoral district
- Legislature: Legislative Assembly of British Columbia
MLA
David Williams
Conservative
- First contested: 1991
- Last contested: 2026

Demographics
- Population (2001): 49,240
- Area (km²): 7,714
- Pop. density (per km²): 6.4
- Census division: Columbia-Shuswap Regional District
- Census subdivision(s): Salmon Arm, Enderby, Armstrong, Spallumcheen, Sicamous

Salmon Arm-Shuswap (formerly Shuswap from 1991 until 2024) is a provincial electoral district for the Legislative Assembly of British Columbia, Canada.

It is the successor riding to the old Salmon Arm riding. The riding adopted its current name and had minor boundary changes from the 2024 election, which implemented the results of the 2021 redistribution.

== Demographics ==
Population, 2001	49,240
Population change, 1996–2001	1.8%
Area (km^{2})	7,714
Population density (people per km^{2})	6

== Geography ==
As of the 2020 provincial election, Shuswap comprised the western portion of the Columbia-Shuswap Regional District and the northwestern portion of the Regional District of North Okanagan. It is located in southern British Columbia. Communities in the electoral district consist of Salmon Arm, Armstrong, Spallumcheen, Enderby, and Sicamous.

== Members of the Legislative Assembly ==
This riding has elected the following members of the Legislative Assembly:

Shuswap
Assembly	Years	Member	Party
35th	1991–1996	Shannon O'Neill	New Democratic
36th	1996–2001	George Abbott	Liberal
37th	2001–2005	George Abbott	Liberal
38th	2005–2009	George Abbott	Liberal
39th	2009–2013	George Abbott	Liberal
40th	2013–2017	Greg Kyllo	Liberal
41st	2017–2020	Greg Kyllo	Liberal
42nd	2020–2023	Greg Kyllo	Liberal
42nd	2023–2024	Greg Kyllo	BC United
43rd	2024–2026	David Williams	Conservative
44th	2026–present	David Williams	Conservative

== Election results ==
2026 British Columbia general election
Party	Candidate	Votes	%	±%	Expenditures
Conservative	David Williams	15,421	54.78	+2.68	
New Democratic	Gloria Morgan	7,906	28.08	-2.32	
Green	Jed Wiebe	2,312	8.21	+1.11	
OneBC	Barbara Presch	1,437	5.10	-	
CentreBC	Denise Reimer	1,032	3.67	-	
Total valid votes		28,108	99.84		
Total rejected ballots		44	0.16		
Turnout					
Registered voters					
Conservative hold		Swing		+2.50	
Source: Elections BC

2024 British Columbia general election
Party	Candidate	Votes	%	±%	Expenditures
Conservative	David L. Williams	16,566	52.1%	+52.0	
New Democratic	Sylvia Lindgren	9,677	30.4%	-3.7	
Independent	Greg McCune	2,922	9.2%		
Green	Jed Wiebe	2,250	7.1%	-7.5	
Independent	Sherry Roy	373	1.2%		
Total valid votes		31,788	–		
Total rejected ballots					
Turnout					
Registered voters					
Source: Elections BC

2020 provincial election redistributed results
Party	%
Liberal	51.2
New Democratic	34.1
Green	14.6
Conservative	0.1

2020 British Columbia general election: Shuswap
Party	Candidate	Votes	%	±%	Expenditures
Liberal	Greg Kyllo	13,300	51.35	−4.45	$52,230.75
New Democratic	Sylvia Lindgren	8,816	34.04	+7.09	$8,793.94
Green	Owen Madden	3,784	14.61	−1.10	$0.00
Total valid votes		25,900	100.00	–	
Total rejected ballots		213	0.82	+0.43	
Turnout		26,113	54.68	−8.12	
Registered voters		47,758			
Source: Elections BC

2017 British Columbia general election: Shuswap
Party	Candidate	Votes	%	±%	Expenditures
Liberal	Greg Kyllo	14,829	55.80	+7.88	$68,341
New Democratic	Sylvia Jean Lindgren	7,161	26.95	−2.62	$27,270
Green	Kevin Babcock	4,175	15.71	+6.37	$1,503
Libertarian	Kyle McCormack	410	1.54	–	$0
Total valid votes		26,575	100.00	–	
Total rejected ballots		103	0.39	+0.10	
Turnout		26,678	62.80	+2.39	
Registered voters		42,481			
Source: Elections BC

2013 British Columbia general election: Shuswap
Party	Candidate	Votes	%	±%
Liberal	Greg Kyllo	11,992	47.92	+1.30
New Democratic	Steve Gunner	7,398	29.57	−0.97
Conservative	Tom Birch	3,232	12.92	+2.64
Green	Chris George	2,338	9.34	−1.66
Advocational	Johanna Zalcik	63	0.25	NA
Total valid votes		25,023	100.00	
Total rejected ballots		74	0.29	
Turnout		25,097	60.41	
Source: Elections BC

BC General Election 2009 Shuswap
Party	Candidate	Votes	%	±	Expenditures
Liberal	George Abbott	10,764	46.62%		$92,432
NDP	Steve Gunner	7,051	30.54%		$41,011
Green	Michel Saab	2,539	11.00%	–	$7,149
Conservative	Beryl Ludwig	2,374	10.28%		$9,378
Marijuana	Chris Emery	361	1.56%		$550
Total valid votes		23,089	100%		
Total rejected ballots		79	0.34%		
Turnout		23,168	56.82%		

2005 British Columbia general election: Shuswap
Party	Candidate	Votes	%	Expenditures
Liberal	George Abbott	11,024	46.96	$89,183
New Democratic	Calvin Ross White	8,281	35.27	$60,432
Conservative	Beryl Ludwig	2,330	9.92	$5,715
Green	Barbara Westerman	1,394	5.94	$1,788
Marijuana	Chris Emery	356	1.52	$100
Bloc	Paddy Roberts	50	0.21	$897
Patriot	Andrew Nicholas Hokhold	42	0.18	$100
Total valid votes		23,477	100.00	
Total rejected ballots		93	0.40	
Turnout		23,570	64.34	

2001 British Columbia general election: Shuswap
Party	Candidate	Votes	%	Expenditures
Liberal	George Abbott	12,950	56.27%	$46,736
NDP	Wayne Fowler	3,788	16.46%	$12,950
Unity	Al Thiessen	2,857	12.41%	$7,793
Green	Larissa Lutjen	2,423	10.53%	$892
Marijuana	Paddy Roberts	835	3.63%	$919
No Affiliation	Jeanette (N.O.) McLennan	119	0.52%	$100
Central	Scott Yee	41	0.18%	$6
Total valid votes		23,013	100.00%	
Total rejected ballots		65	0.28%	
Turnout		23,078	72.01%	

BC General Election 1996: Shuswap
Party	Candidate	Votes	%	±	Expenditures
Liberal	George Abbott	8,596	34.55%		$35,489
NDP	Calvin White	7,869	31.63%		$37,552
Reform	Colin Mayes	5,356	22.58%		$21,375
Progressive Democrat	Bev Torrens	1,325	5.33%	–	$4,193
No Affiliation	Gordon Campbell	810	3.26%		
Green	Paul Stephen De Felice	237	0.95%	–	$100
Social Credit	Robert Goss	221	0.89%	–	$1,363
Independent	Merv Ritchie	204	0.82%		$505
Total valid votes		24,879	100.00%		
Total rejected ballots		200	0.80%		
Turnout		25,079	72.79%		

BC General Election 1991: Shuswap
Party	Candidate	Votes	%	±	Expenditures
NDP	Shannon O'Neill	7,687	35.50%		$33,572
Liberal	Michel Saab	7,282	33.63%		$6,267
Social Credit	Edith E. Rizzi	6,262	28.92%	–	$45,222
Green	Connie Harris	422	1.95%	–	$635
Total valid votes		21,653	100.00%		
Total rejected ballots		356	1.62%		
Turnout		22,009	76.42%		

== See also ==
- List of electoral districts in the Okanagan
- List of British Columbia provincial electoral districts
- Canadian provincial electoral districts
- Yale (provincial electoral district)
