= Wherever I Go =

Wherever I Go may refer to:

- "Wherever I Go" (Hannah Montana), the 2011 series finale of Hannah Montana
- "Wherever I Go" (Dan Bremnes song), 2018
- "Wherever I Go" (OneRepublic song), a 2016 single by OneRepublic
- "Wherever I Go", a song by Mark Knopfler from Tracker, 2015
- "Wherever I Go", a song by Miley Cyrus from Hannah Montana Forever, 2010
- "Wherever I Go", a song by Steve Earle from Transcendental Blues, 2000
- "Wherever I Go", a song by Brent Faiyaz from Larger than Life, 2023
