= Pleasant Valley Secondary School =

Pleasant Valley Secondary

Location
- 2365 Pleasant Valley Road; Armstrong, British Columbia, V0E 1B2; Canada
- Coordinates: 50.4375°N 119.2090°W

Information
- School type: Public, high school
- School board: School District 83 North Okanagan-Shuswap
- School district: 83
- School number: 8321004
- Principal: Steve Drapala
- Staff: 53
- Grades: 9–12
- Language: English
- Colours: Red, Black and White
- Sports: Basketball, Volleyball, Soccer, Football, Ultimate Frisbee
- Team name: The Hawks (prev. Saints and Sinners)
- Website: pvs.sd83.bc.ca

Pleasant Valley Secondary is a public high school in Armstrong, British Columbia part of School District 83 North Okanagan-Shuswap.

PVSS unanimously voted for their school mascot to be a hawk.

The school board has been working on changing the team name “Saints and Sinners” because it has many negative undertones. As of May 2021, the PVSS sports teams has changed their name to the Hawks. Settling on a logo that displays a red hawk perched on the P of the PVSS.
