= Dave Scatchard =

Canadian ice hockey player (born 1976)

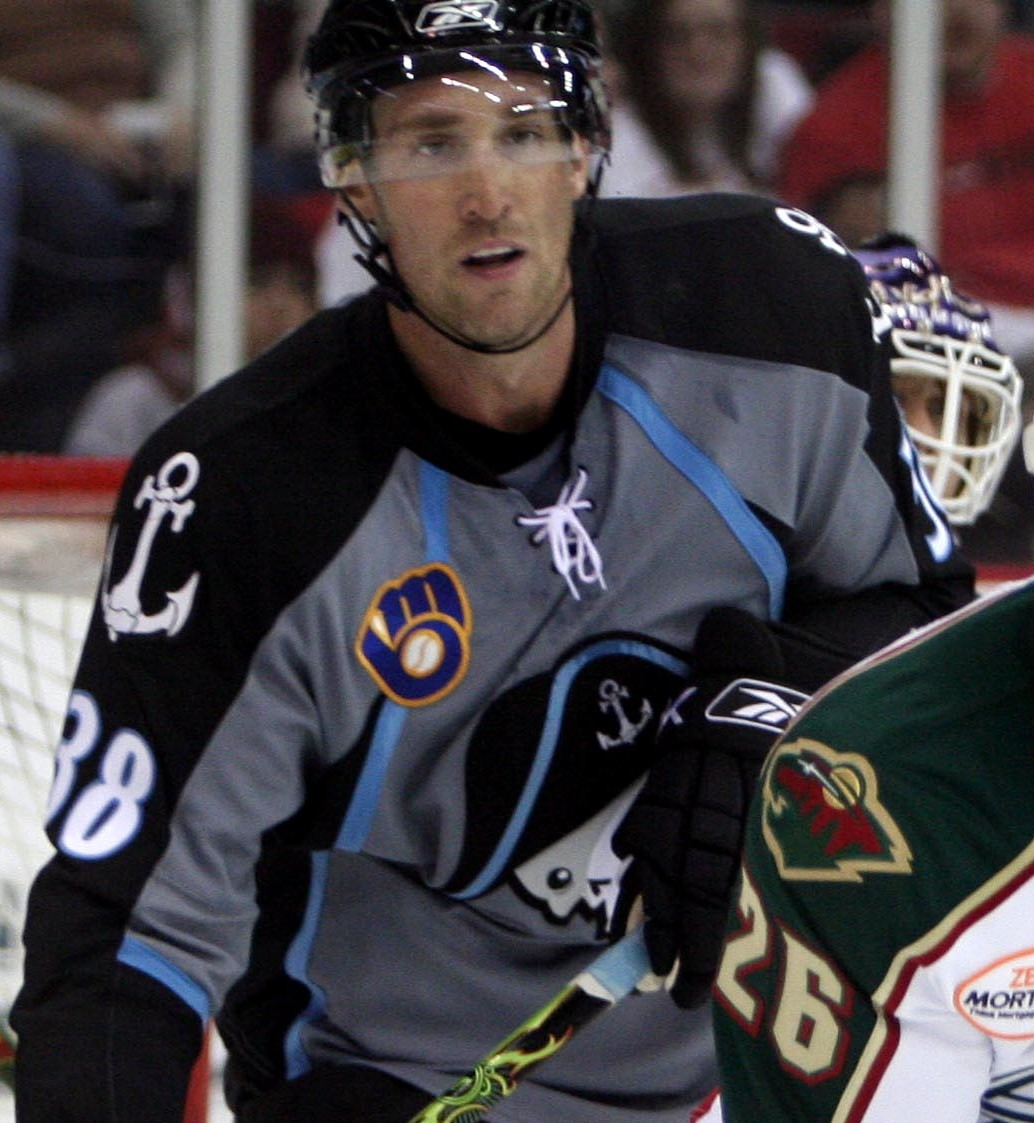
- Scatchard with the Milwaukee Admirals in 2007
- Born: February 20, 1976 (age 50) Hinton, Alberta, Canada
- Height: 6 ft 2 in (188 cm)
- Weight: 224 lb (102 kg; 16 st 0 lb)
- Position: Centre
- Shot: Right
- Played for: Vancouver Canucks; New York Islanders; Boston Bruins; Phoenix Coyotes; Nashville Predators; St. Louis Blues
- NHL draft: 42nd overall, 1994; Vancouver Canucks
- Playing career: 1996–2011

Dave Scatchard (born February 20, 1976) is a Canadian former professional ice hockey centre. He played in the National Hockey League (NHL) with the Vancouver Canucks, New York Islanders, Boston Bruins, Phoenix Coyotes, Nashville Predators, and St. Louis Blues. Scatchard was born in Hinton, Alberta, but grew up in Salmon Arm, British Columbia.

== Playing career ==
Scatchard played as a junior for the Portland Winter Hawks of the Western Hockey League (WHL). The Vancouver Canucks selected him 42nd overall in the 1994 NHL entry draft. He spent his first year as a professional in the American Hockey League (AHL) with the Syracuse Crunch, Vancouver's minor league affiliate. Scatchard made his NHL debut in the 1997–98 season, registering 24 points and establishing himself as a two-way forward. On December 19, 1999, during his third season in Vancouver, the Canucks traded Scatchard to the New York Islanders along with forward Bill Muckalt and goaltender Kevin Weekes for goaltender Felix Potvin. Scatchard played four and a half seasons with the Islanders, recording two career-high 45-point campaigns in 2000–01 and 2002–03. Following the 2004–05 NHL lockout, Scatchard signed with the Boston Bruins, but after just 16 games, he was traded to the Phoenix Coyotes for defenceman David Tanabe on November 18, 2005. In 2006–07, Scatchard was sidelined for the last 32 games of the season with a concussion, finishing with eight points in 45 games. The Coyotes bought him out of the final two years of his contract in the off-season.

On November 15, 2007, Scatchard signed a professional try-out with the Milwaukee Admirals of the AHL, the top minor league affiliate of the Nashville Predators. He was released after eight games.

Scatchard subsequently took time off due to lingering concussion problems. Prior to the 2009–10 season, he was invited to the Vancouver Canucks' training camp but was released before the end of the pre-season. Shortly after the regular season began, he signed a one-year deal to return with the Predators organization.

On August 3, 2010, Scatchard, once again a free agent, signed a one-year contract with the St. Louis Blues.

On August 22, 2011, he announced his retirement on Twitter, stating that doctors told him it would not be safe for him to continue to play hockey due to concussion-related injuries.

== Career statistics ==
			Regular season					Playoffs
Season	Team	League	GP	G	A	Pts	PIM	GP	G	A	Pts	PIM
1991–92	Salmon Arm Selects	BCMML	65	98	100	198	167	—	—	—	—	—
1992–93	Kimberley Dynamiters	RMJHL	51	20	23	43	61	—	—	—	—	—
1993–94	Portland Winter Hawks	WHL	47	9	11	20	46	10	2	1	3	4
1994–95	Portland Winter Hawks	WHL	71	20	30	50	148	8	0	3	3	21
1995–96	Portland Winter Hawks	WHL	59	19	28	47	146	7	1	8	9	14
1995–96	Syracuse Crunch	AHL	1	0	0	0	0	15	2	5	7	29
1996–97	Syracuse Crunch	AHL	26	8	7	15	65	—	—	—	—	—
1997–98	Vancouver Canucks	NHL	76	13	11	24	165	—	—	—	—	—
1998–99	Vancouver Canucks	NHL	82	13	13	26	140	—	—	—	—	—
1999–2000	Vancouver Canucks	NHL	21	0	4	4	24	—	—	—	—	—
1999–2000	New York Islanders	NHL	44	12	14	26	93	—	—	—	—	—
2000–01	New York Islanders	NHL	81	21	24	45	114	—	—	—	—	—
2001–02	New York Islanders	NHL	80	12	15	27	111	7	1	1	2	22
2002–03	New York Islanders	NHL	81	27	18	45	108	5	1	0	1	6
2003–04	New York Islanders	NHL	61	9	16	25	78	5	0	1	1	6
2005–06	Boston Bruins	NHL	16	4	6	10	28	—	—	—	—	—
2005–06	Phoenix Coyotes	NHL	47	11	12	23	84	—	—	—	—	—
2006–07	Phoenix Coyotes	NHL	46	3	5	8	72	—	—	—	—	—
2007–08	Hartford Wolf Pack	AHL	3	0	1	1	0	—	—	—	—	—
2007–08	Milwaukee Admirals	AHL	8	1	2	3	14	—	—	—	—	—
2009–10	Milwaukee Admirals	AHL	36	20	10	30	59	3	0	0	0	2
2009–10	Nashville Predators	NHL	16	3	2	5	17	—	—	—	—	—
2010–11	Peoria Rivermen	AHL	41	7	11	18	50	—	—	—	—	—
2010–11	St. Louis Blues	NHL	8	0	1	1	6	—	—	—	—	—
NHL totals			659	128	141	269	1040	17	2	2	4	34
