= David Williams (Canadian politician) =

Canadian politician

David Williams MLA

Member of the Legislative Assembly of British Columbia for Salmon Arm-Shuswap
- Incumbent
- Assumed office October 19, 2024
- Preceded by: Greg Kyllo

Personal details
- Party: BC Conservative

David Williams is a Canadian politician who was elected to the Legislative Assembly of British Columbia in the 2024 British Columbia general election. He represents the electoral district of Salmon Arm-Shuswap as a member of the Conservative Party of British Columbia.

== Early life and career ==
Williams is a long-time Shuswap resident, and currently resides there with his wife, children and grandchildren.

He began his career working in the HVAC industry in roles from commercial project management to small business ownership. He then shifted to work in residential and commercial real estate. His experiences and education then led him to roles with the BC Assessment Authority and to work as a regional appraiser with the Saskatchewan Assessment Management Authority. Prior to his start in politics, Williams worked as a loss control specialist and residential appraiser in the insurance industry providing appraisal reports for high-value properties and farms across the Shuswap-Okanagan region.

Williams has also been an active member of his community, coaching minor soccer and baseball and being involved in administrative roles on local sports associations. He has also served as a board director for the Kelowna Metis Community Services Society, chaired the CSRD Board of Variance, and has held a government-appointed position on the Salmon Arm Property Assessment Review Panel.

== Political career ==
In November 2023, Williams was nominated as the Conservative Party of BC' s candidate for Salmon Arm-Shuswap. He went on to win his riding and a seat in the Legislative Assembly of BC with 52.1% of the vote. He celebrated his win with his team and supporters at the Royal Canadian Legion in Salmon Arm.

He currently serves in the official opposition's shadow cabinet as the Critic for BC Hydro and Electricity Self-Sufficiency. His policy priorities include government transparency, fair taxation, supporting small businesses, and justice reform.

== Electoral record ==
2026 British Columbia general election: Salmon Arm-Shuswap
Party	Candidate	Votes	%	±%	Expenditures
Conservative	David Williams	15,421	54.78	+2.68	
New Democratic	Gloria Morgan	7,906	28.08	-2.32	
Green	Jed Wiebe	2,312	8.21	+1.11	
OneBC	Barbara Presch	1,437	5.10	-	
CentreBC	Denise Reimer	1,032	3.67	-	
Total valid votes		28,108	99.84		
Total rejected ballots		44	0.16		
Turnout					
Registered voters					
Conservative hold		Swing		+2.50	
Source: Elections BC

2024 British Columbia general election: Salmon Arm-Shuswap
Party	Candidate	Votes	%	±%	Expenditures
Conservative	David L. Williams	16,566	52.1%	+52.0	
New Democratic	Sylvia Lindgren	9,677	30.4%	-3.7	
Independent	Greg McCune	2,922	9.2%		
Green	Jed Wiebe	2,250	7.1%	-7.5	
Independent	Sherry Roy	373	1.2%		
Total valid votes		31,788	–		
Total rejected ballots					
Turnout					
Registered voters					
Source: Elections BC

== See also ==
- 43rd Parliament of British Columbia
