= She Knows =

She Knows may refer to:

== Music ==
- "She Knows" (Dimitri Vegas & Like Mike song)
- "She Knows" (J. Cole song)
- "She Knows" (Ne-Yo song)
- "She Knows", a 1986 song by Balaam and the Angel
- "She Knows", a 1989 song by The Barracudas
- "She Knows", a song by Suzi Quatro from Main Attraction

== Other uses ==
- "She Knows" (Suits), a 2012 television episode
- SheKnows.com, a website of SheKnows Media

== See also ==
- He Knows (disambiguation)
