= JJ Heller =

American singer-songwriter

- Born: Jennifer Judy Kellner; October 19, 1980 (age 46); San Jose, California
- Genres: Folk music, contemporary Christian music
- Years active: 2003–present
- Label: Stone Table Records
- Website: www.jjheller.com

Jennifer Judy "JJ" Heller (born October 19, 1980, née Kellner) is an American Christian folk singer. After releasing multiple albums, she had two songs that charted. "Your Hands" from her 2008 album Painted Red and "What Love Really Means" from the album When I'm with You both peaked at number 13.

== Career ==
Heller grew up in San Jose, California in a family with strong Christian values. She didn't listen to music much as a child. She attended high school at Valley Christian High School and then went on to attend college at San Jose Christian College (now William Jessup University) and began writing songs in her second year. She joined a band which played at coffee shops in the area; the band included her future husband Dave Heller. He continues to collaborate with writing, recording and producing her works.

Heller released multiple albums before she had her first chart appearance in 2009. Her song "Your Hands", from her album Painted Red hit number 13 on the Billboard Christian Songs chart.

Heller released her next album When I'm with You in 2010 and it charted, peaking at number 33 on Billboard's Christian Albums. She released "What Love Really Means" as the first single from the album and it peaked at number 13 on the Billboard Singles chart. In 2011 she released her Deeper album, which is a collection of acoustic songs, which were put aside to allow her to release the more pop-oriented When I'm with You. When I'm With You was covered by Jennifer Love Hewitt's character Riley Parks on Season 2 Episode 6 of The Client List entitled "Unanswered Prayers". The shortened cover was released on iTunes on April 9, 2013.

Heller released Loved on March 12, 2013. Her song "Control" was featured on Season 7 Episode 19 of One Tree Hill.

Heller performed "Find Me in the River" with KJ Apa on the soundtrack for the 2020 film, I Still Believe.

Since 2018, Heller has released several full-length albums featuring covers and re-imagined versions of her own songs for her passion project titled "I Dream of You". With each album produced by her husband David Heller, each song contains production elements of orchestral, chorale, and minimalist pop-rock flavors.

Heller released "I Dream of You: HOME" in October 2024. This album features covers of "Fix You" by Coldplay, "Home" by Phillip Phillips, and "Two of Us" by The Beatles.

== Musical style ==
She credits Damien Rice and Patty Griffin as influences to her style. AllMusic describes her sound as being comparable with Jewel, Alison Krauss, Sara Groves and Griffin.

== Discography ==
=== Albums ===
Year	Album	Chart			
Year	Album	US; Christ	US; Folk	US; Heat	US; Kids
2004	Songs That I Know	—	—	—	—
2005	Collection of Thoughts (EP)	—	—	—	—
2006	Only Love Remains	—	—	—	—
2007	Wake Up the World (Christmas EP)	—	—	—	—
2007	The Pretty & The Plain	—	—	—	—
2008	Painted Red	—	12	50	—
2010	When I'm with You	33	9	19	—
2011	Deeper	38	—	22	—
2013	Loved	42	10	6	—
2014	I Dream of You	—	23	43	—
2015	Sound of a Living Heart	15	16	—	—
2016	Unto Us (Christmas album)	23	24	11	—
2018	I Dream of You Vol. II	—	—	—	19
2021	I Dream of You Vol. III	—	—	—	—
"—" denotes releases that did not chart

=== Singles ===
Year	Single	Peak	Album
Year	Single	US Christ	Album
2010	"What Love Really Means"	13	When I'm with You
2009	"Your Hands"	13	Painted Red
2014	"The Perfect Gift"	—	non-album single
2015	"This Year (Happy New Year)"	43	Sound of a Living Heart
2015	"Meant To Be"	31	Sound of a Living Heart
2017	"This Little Light of Mine"	—	non-album single
2017	"Paving the Runway (You're Gonna Fly)"	—	I Dream of You (Volume II)
2018	"God Is Still Here"	—	non-album single
2019	"A Mother Like You"	—	non-album single
2019	"Even Here"	—	non-album single
2019	"Born In Me"	—	non-album single
2020	"Missing Peace"	—	non-album single

=== Guest appearances ===
Year	Artist	Album	Song
2011	The City Harmonic	I Have a Dream (It Feels Like Home)	"Holy (Wedding Day)"
