= School District 83 Kwsaltktnéws ne Secwepemcúl'ecw =

School district in British Columbia, Canada

Location
- Salmon Arm Salmon Arm, Enderby, Armstrong in Okanagan/Mainline Canada

District information
- Superintendent: Mrs. Donna Kriger
- Schools: 24
- Budget: CA$57.2 million

Students and staff
- Students: 6100

Other information
- Website: www.sd83.bc.ca

School District 83 Kwsaltktnéws ne Secwepemcúl'ecw is a school district in British Columbia. This includes the major center of Salmon Arm and the area around Shuswap Lake as well as the northern Okanagan communities of Armstrong and Enderby.

In 2024, the School District No. 83 Board of Education voted to adopt the Secwépemctsín name "Kwsaltktnéws ne Secwepemcúl’ecw," meaning “we are all connected (people, animals, sky, land, and water) on Secwépemc land.” The Secwépemc name was gifted to the school district by the Adams Lake Indian Band, Sk’eEtsin, Skwlāx te Secwepemcúl’ecw, and Splatsin.

== History ==
School District 83 was created in 1996 with the merger of School District 21 Armstrong-Spallumcheen and School District 89 Shuswap.

== Schools ==
School	Location	Grades
A L Fortune Secondary School	Enderby	8-12
Armstrong Elementary School	Armstrong	K-5
Bastion Elementary School	Salmon Arm	K-5
Carlin Elementary/Middle School	Tappen	K-7
Eagle River Secondary School	Sicamous	7-12
Enderby Alternate School	Salmon Arm	2-10
Enderby Storefront School	Salmon Arm	11-12
Falkland Elementary School	Falkland	K-7
Gateway Community Learning Centre	Armstrong	11-12
Grindrod Elementary School	Grindrod	K-7
Highland Park Elementary School	Armstrong	K-5
Hillcrest Elementary School	Salmon Arm	K-5
Len Wood Middle School	Armstrong	6-8
M.V. Beattie Elementary School	Enderby	K-5
North Canoe Elementary School	Canoe	K-5
North Shuswap Elementary School	Celista	K-7
Outreach Alternate School	Salmon Arm	K-12
Parkview Elementary School	Sicamous	K-7
Pleasant Valley Secondary School	Armstrong	9-12
Ranchero Elementary School	Salmon Arm	K-7
Salmon Arm Alternate School	Salmon Arm	4-10
Salmon Arm Secondary School	Salmon Arm	9-12
Salmon Arm Storefront School	Salmon Arm	11-12
Salmon Arm West Elementary School	Salmon Arm	K-5
Shuswap Middle School	Salmon Arm	6-8
Sicamous Storefront School	Salmon Arm	9-12
Silver Creek Elementary School	Salmon Arm/Silver Creek	K-8
Sorrento Elementary School	Sorrento	K-5
South Broadview Elementary School	Salmon Arm	K-5

== See also ==
- List of school districts in British Columbia
