= Justin Maas =

Canadian painter

- Born: October 2, 1972; Hartford, Connecticut
- Known for: Portraiture

Justin Maas is a Canadian realist artist and author. Maas' first book "Drawing Realistic Pencil Portraits Step by Step: Basic Techniques for the Head and Face" was published by F + W (now Penguin Random House). He has written articles for many art Magazines including The Artist's Magazine (July/Aug 2019) and The Pastel Journal (October 2019) Maas was born in Hartford, Connecticut and currently resides in Salmon Arm, British Columbia

== Education ==
Maas studied briefly at the Art Institute of Chicago and the Milwaukee Art Museum before enrolling in the Visual Communications Program at the Alberta College of Art and Design where he received a 4 year diploma.

Maas is a Senior Signature Member of the Federation of Canadian Artists and an Elected Member of the Society of Canadian Artists

== Awards ==
- 2019 Awarded Senior Signature Member status with the Federation of Canadian Artists

- 2018 1st Place - 2018 Star Wars Awards "Best Traditional Art" in Visual Art Category"
- 2018 2nd Place - Federation of Canadian Artists Chapter Show

- 2017 2nd Place - Federation of Canadian Artists National Show
- 2017 2nd Place - Federation of Canadian Artists Chapter Show
- 2017 Award of Excellence - Federation of Canadian Artists National Works on Paper Show
- 2017 Marie Manson Award Recipient

- 2016 1st Place - Federation of Canadian Artists COC Chapter Show
- 2016 1st Place - Federation of Canadian Artists National Show
- 2016 2nd Place - Federation of Canadian Artists Chapter Show
- 2016 Award of Excellence - Federation of Canadian Artists National Works on Paper Show - January 2016

- 2015 1st Place - Federation of Canadian Artists TNSC Chapter Show
- 2015 2nd Place - Federation of Canadian Artists COC Chapter Show

- 2014 3rd Place - Federation of Canadian Artists COC National Show
- 2014 Award of Excellence - Federation of Canadian Artists TNSC Chapter Show

- 2012 - 2nd Place - Federation of Canadian Artists TNSC Chapter Show

== Works ==
Maas' works are in private collections across Canada, The United States and Europe. As well, he has several famous clients including Actors, Actresses and Musicians.

Maas' has done a series of features for Strathmore Artists Papers, specifically their Toned Tan line.

Maas' drawing of Ken Jeong was featured on Today (U.S. TV program)
