= Sound of a Living Heart =

Studio album by JJ Heller
- Released: August 21, 2015
- Genre: Contemporary Christian music, folk, indie pop
- Length: 35:37
- Label: Stone Table, Sparrow, Capitol CMG

JJ Heller chronology
I Dream of You (album) (2014)	Sound of a Living Heart (2015)

Sound of a Living Heart is the tenth studio album by JJ Heller. Stone Table Records alongside Sparrow Records released the album on August 21, 2015.

== Critical reception ==
Professional ratings
Review scores
Source	Rating
365 Days of Inspiring Media	4.5/5 stars
CCM Magazine	3.5/5 stars
The Christian Beat	4.5/5
Christian Music Review	4.7/5
Cross Rhythms	9/10 squares
Jesus Freak Hideout	4/5 stars
New Release Today	4.5/5 stars 5/5 stars

In a three-and-a-half star review for CCM Magazine Kevin Sparkman wrote "Heller continues her proven formula of innocent melodies, heart moving lyrics, and inviting musical moments." Awarding the album four stars, Mark D. Geil from Jesus Freak Hideout states "Sound of a Living Heart is an encouraging sign of a continued upward trajectory." Jay Heilman, reviewing the album for Christian Music Review, described being "highly impressed...Sound of A Living Heart was a pleasant surprise!" Giving the album four and a half stars at New Release Today, Caitlin Lassiter wrote that "Sound Of A Living Heart proves to be a success for the Heller crew and is sure to be met with fan approval." Kevin Davis, in a five star review by New Release Today, called the album "flawless...you'll hang on every word she emotionally sings." In a 4.5 out of five review for The Christian Beat, Abby Baracskai wrote that "with this album, JJ Heller gives the world a work of art...Sound Of A Living Heart is full of unique musical creations paired with meaningful and faithful lyrics that help bring you closer to God." Jonathan Andre, rating the album four and a half stars for 365 Days of Inspiring Media, states "this is an album not to be missed by anyone". In a nine out of ten review at Cross Rhythms Andrew Wallace called it "an excellent album from an artist still trying to grow."

== Track listing ==
Track listing
No.	Title	Length
1.	"Let Down Your Guard"	2:47
2.	"The Well"	2:56
3.	"Fully Known"	3:17
4.	"Meant to Be"	2:56
5.	"Father-Daughter Dance" (featuring Matt Hammitt)	3:53
6.	"This Year (Happy New Year)"	3:10
7.	"Holy Ground"	2:56
8.	"Daylight"	3:27
9.	"Scarlet Thread"	2:49
10.	"Silence"	3:42
11.	"Sound of a Living Heart"	3:44
Total length:		35:37

== Chart performance ==
Chart (2015)	Peak position
US Christian Albums (Billboard)	15
US Folk Albums (Billboard)	16
US Independent Albums (Billboard)	45
