= I Dream of You (album) =

Studio album by JJ Heller
- Released: April 29, 2014
- Genre: CCM, folk
- Length: 43:54
- Label: Stone Table
- Producer: Ben Shive

JJ Heller chronology
Loved (2013)	I Dream of You (2014)	Sound of a Living Heart (2015)

I Dream of You is the ninth album from Christian music singer-songwriter JJ Heller, which released on April 29, 2014, by Stone Table Records, and it was produced by Ben Shive. The album received three positive reviews and saw commercial charting successes.

== Background ==
JJ Heller released the album entitled I Dream of You on April 29, 2014, through Stone Table Records, and it was produced by Ben Shive. This album is a collection of lullabies that was funded via a Kickstarter campaign.

== Critical reception ==
Professional ratings
Review scores
Source	Rating
Christian Music Review	4.5/5 stars
CM Addict	4/5 stars
Cross Rhythms	7/10 squares
New Release Tuesday	4/5 stars
Worship Leader	4/5 stars

I Dream of You garnered three positive review from music critics. At New Release Tuesday, Kevin Davis rated the album four stars out of five, stating that "I Dream of You is a soothing and emotionally moving listening experience." April Covington of Christian Music Review rated the album four-and-a-half stars out of five, writing that "The music is light and brings about warm feelings." At CM Addict, Brianne Bellomy rated the album four stars out of five, saying that simply it is a "beautiful project."

== Commercial performance ==
For the Billboard charting week of May 17, 2014, I Dream of You was the No. 23 most sold album in the Folk Albums market and it was the No. 43 most sold album in the breaking-and-entry category via the Top Heatseekers Albums.

== Track listing ==
All tracks are written by JJ Heller and David Heller unless noted.

No.	Title	Writer(s)	Length
1.	"I Dream of You"		4:18
2.	"Big World, Baby"		2:55
3.	"When, I'm with You"		2:28
4.	"I Know You Will"		4:11
5.	"The Sun Will Rise"		3:55
6.	"Keep You Safe"	JJ Heller, David Heller, Jaylene Johnson	3:45
7.	"Daydream"		3:56
8.	"I Get to Be the One"		3:14
9.	"Take It with Me"	Kathleen Brennan, Tom Waits	3:41
10.	"Sailing the Sugar Sea"		3:39
11.	"Boat Song"		4:30
12.	"Lullaby"		3:22
Total length:			43:54

== Chart performance ==
Album

Chart (2014)	Peak position
US Americana/Folk Albums (Billboard)	23
US Heatseekers Albums (Billboard)	43
