= Jesse Mast =

- Born: Edmonton, Alberta, Canada
- Origin: Salmon Arm, British Columbia, Canada
- Genres: Country
- Occupation: Singer-songwriter
- Years active: 2014–2017
- Website: jessemast.com

Jesse Mast is a Canadian country music singer-songwriter from Salmon Arm, British Columbia. He has written with Larry Wayne Clark and toured with Gord Bamford. He won three awards from the North American Country Music Association International in 2014: Songwriter of the Year, Male Vocalist of the Year and Male Entertainer of the Year.

Mast is signed to Cache Entertainment/Sony Music Canada and released his debut single, "Bad Blood", in January 2016. It debuted on the Billboard Canada Country chart in March 2016.

== Discography ==
=== Singles ===
Year	Single	Peak positions	Album
Year	Single	CAN Country	Album
2016	"Bad Blood"	30	TBD

=== Music videos ===
Year	Video	Director
2016	"Bad Blood"	Stephano Barberis
2017	"Hold the Line"	
2017	"Somewhere South"	
