= Armstrong, British Columbia =

Armstrong
- City
- City of Armstrong
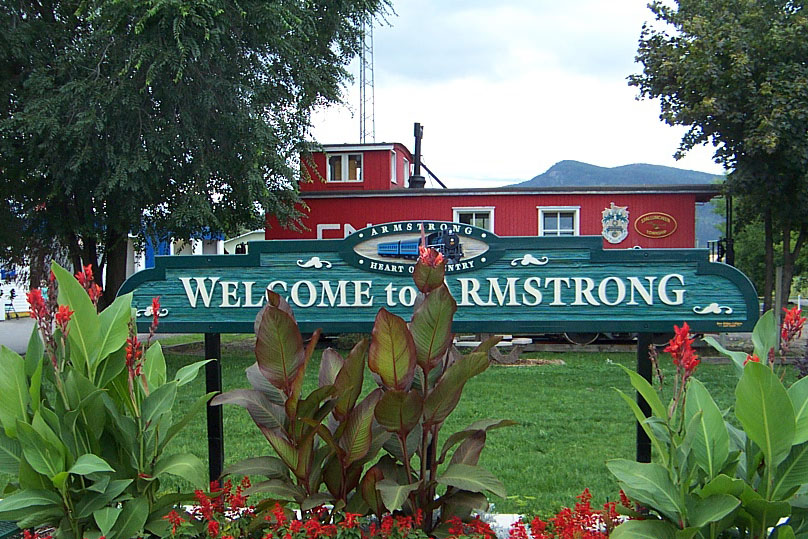
- Welcome sign
- Motto: "Spirit, Vision"
- Location of Armstrong in British Columbia
- Coordinates: 50°26′54″N 119°11′46″W
- Country: Canada
- Province: British Columbia
- Regional District: North Okanagan
- Incorporated: 1913

Government
  - Governing body: Armstrong City Council
  - Mayor: Chris Pieper
  - MP: Colin Mayes (Conservative)
  - MLA: Greg Kyllo (Liberal)

Area
  - City: 5.19 km^{2} (2.00 sq mi)
- Elevation: 360 m (1,180 ft)

Population (2021)
  - City: 5,323
  - Density: 1,030/km^{2} (2,660/sq mi)
  - Urban: 4,830
  - Metro: 9,870
- Time zone: UTC−07:00 (PT)
- Forward sortation area: V4Y, V0E 1B0
- Area code: 250 / 778 / 236 / 672
- Highways: 97A
- Waterways: Okanagan Lake
- Website: www.cityofarmstrong.bc.ca

Armstrong is a city in the North Okanagan of the Canadian province of British Columbia, between Vernon and Enderby. It overlooks the Spallumcheen Valley, which forms a broad pass between the Okanagan Valley to the south and the Shuswap Country to the north, and is about 480 km (300 mi) from each of Vancouver, B.C. and Spokane, Washington. The City of Armstrong celebrated its centennial in 2013.

== Location and history ==
Armstrong is a rural community and commercial center in the North Okanagan, with agriculture, grain farming of alfalfa and corn, logging, and ranching being traditional economic activities. It is located amidst the dairy and farmlands of the Spallumcheen Valley (a name derived from a Shuswap language word with multiple meanings: "beautiful valley", "flat meadow", "meeting of the waters", and "prairie-banked river").

Armstrong was named after William Heaton Armstrong, a London banker who helped finance the Shuswap and Okanagan Railway in 1892 and local development at the turn of the century, relocating the townsite originally at Landsdowne to the confluence of the Valley's rail lines and the city's current site.

In 1921, there were 983 people in Alberni.

The influence of Dutch immigrants settling in the valley after the Second World War is represented by their cheese-making knowledge, allowing Armstrong to become well known for the cheese it produced.

The city is also well known for hosting the Interior Provincial Exhibition and Stampede, which has been in annual operation since 1899 though the event was cancelled in 2020 and 2021 because of the COVID-19 pandemic. The "IPE" is very much still an agricultural fair, with contests being held to judge animals, cooking, sewing, hobbies, and other items. Additionally, the exhibition offers a variety of entertainment options ranging from concerts, competitions, and the famous mini-chuckwagon races.

Armstrong is a corporation operated by a seven-member city council headed by the Mayor, with meetings being held the second and fourth Mondays of every month. The Mayor is Joe Cramer, who was elected in 2022 and is currently in his first term as mayor.

Armstrong has four public education facilities; two elementary schools, a middle school, and a high school. Armstrong Elementary School was initially known as the "Armstrong Spallumcheen Consolidated School". When it was built in 1921, it was the first school in the Province to be constructed as a central school into which were consolidated approximately thirteen small country or one-room schools. Len Wood Middle school and Pleasant Valley Secondary were later added to suit the growing region, with Highland Park Elementary opening in 1983 to satisfy increasing demand and lack of suitable expansion capacity at Armstrong Elementary. There is also a store-front style facility, Gateway Continuing Education Centre, operated by School District 83.

== Economy, tourist attractions, and activities ==
Historical population
Year	Pop.	±%
1921	983	—
1931	989	+0.6%
1941	977	−1.2%
1951	1,126	+15.3%
1956	1,197	+6.3%
1961	1,288	+7.6%
1966	1,426	+10.7%
1971	1,648	+15.6%
1976	2,260	+37.1%
1981	2,683	+18.7%
1986	2,706	+0.9%
1991	3,200	+18.3%
1996	3,906	+22.1%
2001	4,256	+9.0%
2006	4,241	−0.4%
2011	4,815	+13.5%
Sources: Statistics Canada

While agriculture, logging, and ranching remain a dominant portion of the economy of Armstrong and the Spallumcheen Valley, tourism increasingly plays a significant role in the economic activity of the area; particularly popular with long-distance cyclists as a desirable location for short-haul excursions.

=== Museums and places of interest ===
Armstrong and the surrounding area feature many attractions including museums, golf courses, water sports, snow sports including skiing and snowmobile riding, boating, fishing and hiking trails.

- The Armstrong-Spallumcheen Museum and Art Gallery, which is the site of the old Armstrong Machine Shop, has over thirty historical displays, replicas of the railways, a schoolhouse, a grocery store, a blacksmith shop, and a comprehensive archive of photographs, newspapers and maps.
- The Old School House is one of the original educational institutions in British Columbia.
- The Caravan Farm Theatre is where professional actors who have long provided entertainment throughout the Okanagan produce a number of annual events and festivals.
- Skiing and snowboarding: the Silver Star Mountain Resort is the most popular winter attraction area in the Okanagan Valley, with close proximity to Armstrong. Skiers and snowboarders take advantage of Silver Star Mountain where they have 2,491 feet (760 m) of vertical drop in which to defy gravity. Cross-country skiers also have a venue at Silver Star with 37 kilometers of tracked and groomed trails. In addition, there are 50 km of groomed trails that pass through the adjacent Sovereign Lake area.
- The Armstrong Farmer's Market, which runs outdoors weekly April to October, is a key attraction at the IPE Fairgrounds on Saturday mornings. A Winter Farmers Market also occurs at the Odd Fellows Hall on Bridge street in the off-season Thursdays from Noon to 5pm.
- The Okanagan and BC Rockies Circle Tour, takes tourists through the interior of British Columbia, north through the Okanagan to Sicamous, following Highway 1 into the mountains of the BC Rockies.
- The Armstrong skateboard park is a large attraction in the city of Armstrong, holding company jams and demos and bringing many people from all over B.C. An indoor park began operation in the fall of 2012 at the IPE Fairgrounds to offer youth year-round access to skating surfaces.
- Armstrong is home to two arenas: Nor Val Arena and Hassan Arena; both cater to community event such as Fabulous Fridays for skating and rollerblading, Shamrock lacrosse, Knights Hockey, and Roller Derby events.

=== Armstrong Cheese ===
Armstrong Cheese is well known throughout Canada and in parts of the United States, and originated in Armstrong. Dairyworld purchased Armstrong Cheese in 1997. Saputo Inc. purchased Dairyworld in 2003, and in February 2004, after being in operation for more than 100 years, closed the Armstrong Cheese site down, laying off 73 workers. However, one of the main tourist attractions continues to be the Village Cheese Company. At the Village Cheese Company, one can watch master cheesemakers at their craft. Among the cheeses available are cheddar, Monterey Jack and "squeaky curds".

== Climate ==
Armstrong has a humid continental climate (Köppen Dfb).

Climate data for Armstrong
Month	Jan	Feb	Mar	Apr	May	Jun	Jul	Aug	Sep	Oct	Nov	Dec	Year
Record high °C (°F)	12.0 (53.6)	13.0 (55.4)	20.0 (68.0)	31.7 (89.1)	34.0 (93.2)	37.0 (98.6)	38.9 (102.0)	37.0 (98.6)	34.0 (93.2)	25.5 (77.9)	20.0 (68.0)	12.5 (54.5)	38.9 (102.0)
Mean daily maximum °C (°F)	−1.1 (30.0)	1.7 (35.1)	9.4 (48.9)	15.1 (59.2)	20.0 (68.0)	23.6 (74.5)	26.5 (79.7)	27.1 (80.8)	20.7 (69.3)	12.4 (54.3)	3.9 (39.0)	−1.5 (29.3)	13.1 (55.6)
Daily mean °C (°F)	−4.4 (24.1)	−2.4 (27.7)	3.4 (38.1)	8.2 (46.8)	12.6 (54.7)	16.2 (61.2)	18.5 (65.3)	18.6 (65.5)	13.0 (55.4)	6.8 (44.2)	0.5 (32.9)	−4.5 (23.9)	7.2 (45.0)
Mean daily minimum °C (°F)	−7.7 (18.1)	−6.6 (20.1)	−2.7 (27.1)	1.1 (34.0)	5.1 (41.2)	8.8 (47.8)	10.5 (50.9)	10.1 (50.2)	5.3 (41.5)	1.2 (34.2)	−2.9 (26.8)	−7.4 (18.7)	1.2 (34.2)
Record low °C (°F)	−32.0 (−25.6)	−27.2 (−17.0)	−20.0 (−4.0)	−11.1 (12.0)	−3.0 (26.6)	−2.0 (28.4)	3.0 (37.4)	1.1 (34.0)	−5.0 (23.0)	−22.0 (−7.6)	−31.5 (−24.7)	−37.0 (−34.6)	−37.0 (−34.6)
Average precipitation mm (inches)	43.6 (1.72)	28.9 (1.14)	29.1 (1.15)	34.0 (1.34)	52.1 (2.05)	60.3 (2.37)	55.0 (2.17)	38.3 (1.51)	43.8 (1.72)	40.4 (1.59)	51.7 (2.04)	51.3 (2.02)	528.5 (20.81)
Average rainfall mm (inches)	6.3 (0.25)	10.2 (0.40)	26.2 (1.03)	33.9 (1.33)	52.1 (2.05)	60.3 (2.37)	55.0 (2.17)	38.3 (1.51)	43.8 (1.72)	40.0 (1.57)	32.6 (1.28)	5.9 (0.23)	404.6 (15.93)
Average snowfall cm (inches)	37.4 (14.7)	18.6 (7.3)	3.1 (1.2)	0.1 (0.0)	0.0 (0.0)	0.0 (0.0)	0.0 (0.0)	0.0 (0.0)	0.0 (0.0)	0.4 (0.2)	19.1 (7.5)	45.4 (17.9)	124.0 (48.8)
Average precipitation days (≥ 0.2 mm)	8.9	6.9	7.0	7.9	10.0	9.9	9.1	6.3	6.1	8.3	10.9	11.0	102.2
Average rainy days (≥ 0.2 mm)	1.5	2.6	6.2	7.9	10.0	9.9	9.1	6.3	6.1	8.2	7.3	1.8	76.8
Average snowy days (≥ 0.2 cm)	7.7	4.8	1.5	0.1	0.0	0.0	0.0	0.0	0.0	0.2	4.5	9.8	28.5

== Demographics ==
In the 2021 Census of Population conducted by Statistics Canada, Armstrong had a population of 5,323 living in 2,217 of its 2,292 total private dwellings, a change of 4.1% from its 2016 population of 5,114. With a land area of 5.22 km^{2} (2.02 sq mi), it had a population density of 1,019.7/km^{2} (2,641.1/sq mi) in 2021.

=== Ethnicity ===
Panethnic groups in the City of Armstrong (2001−2021)
Panethnic group	2021		2016		2011		2006		2001	
Panethnic group	Pop.	%	Pop.	%	Pop.	%	Pop.	%	Pop.	%
European (Note: Statistic includes all persons that did not make up part of a visible minority or an indigenous identity.)	4,560	89.15%	4,415	89.64%	4,255	91.02%	3,765	90.83%	3,965	94.97%
Indigenous	375	7.33%	345	7.01%	315	6.74%	245	5.91%	140	3.35%
East Asian (Note: Statistic includes total responses of "Chinese", "Korean", and "Japanese" under visible minority section on census.)	80	1.56%	90	1.83%	50	1.07%	75	1.81%	60	1.44%
South Asian	40	0.78%	10	0.2%	0	0%	10	0.24%	10	0.24%
Southeast Asian (Note: Statistic includes total responses of "Filipino" and "Southeast Asian" under visible minority section on census.)	25	0.49%	15	0.3%	0	0%	10	0.24%	10	0.24%
African	20	0.39%	15	0.3%	20	0.43%	0	0%	0	0%
Latin American	10	0.2%	0	0%	0	0%	0	0%	0	0%
Middle Eastern (Note: Statistic includes total responses of "West Asian" and "Arab" under visible minority section on census.)	0	0%	20	0.41%	0	0%	30	0.72%	0	0%
Other/multiracial (Note: Statistic includes total responses of "Visible minority, n.i.e." and "Multiple visible minorities" under visible minority section on census.)	0	0%	15	0.3%	0	0%	0	0%	0	0%
Total responses	5,115	96.09%	4,925	96.3%	4,675	96.79%	4,145	97.74%	4,175	98.1%
Total population	5,323	100%	5,114	100%	4,830	100%	4,241	100%	4,256	100%
Note: Totals greater than 100% due to multiple origin responses.

=== Religion ===
According to the 2021 census, religious groups in Armstrong included:

- Irreligion (2,990 persons or 58.5%)
- Christianity (2,000 persons or 39.1%)
- Buddhism (15 persons or 0.3%)
- Other (80 persons or 1.6%)

== Education ==
The public schools system is administered by School District 83 North Okanagan-Shuswap, headquartered in nearby Salmon Arm. Pleasant Valley Secondary School (PVSS) is the local high school and Len Wood Middle School is the middle school. There are two elementary schools; Highland Park Elementary, and Armstrong Elementary with students bussing in from nearby Falkland also making up a portion of the school population. The high-school is also getting a 16 million dollar gym renovation. The gym will be available to use by the community and the schools.

== Sports ==
Club	League	Sport	Venue	Established	Championships
Armstrong Shamrocks	TOJLL	Lacrosse	Nor Val Sports Center	2009	3

== Notable people ==
- Theobald Butler Barrett — Canadian politician
- Shyla Stylez — pornographic actress
- Ina Forrest — Canadian Olympic wheelchair curler
