= We Are (The City Harmonic album) =

Studio album by The City Harmonic
- Released: September 4, 2015
- Genre: Worship, Christian rock, indie rock, pop rock
- Length: 43:53
- Label: Integrity

The City Harmonic chronology
Heart (2013)	We Are (2015)	Benediction (Live) (2017)

We Are is the third and final studio album by The City Harmonic. Integrity Music released the album on September 4, 2015.

== Critical reception ==
Professional ratings
Review scores
Source	Rating
Alpha Omega News	A−
CCM Magazine	4/5 stars
Christian Music Review	4.2/5
The Christian Beat	4/5
Jesus Freak Hideout	3.5/5 stars 3/5 stars
Louder Than the Music	5/5 stars
New Release Today	4.5/5 stars
Worship Leader	4/5 stars

Matt Conner, giving the album four stars from CCM Magazine, describes, "Fortunately they've maintained their initial heart for unity in the church". Awarding the album four stars at Worship Leader, Gary Durbin states, "The City Harmonic brings another album filled with great musicality...it's a fantastic tool for your personal worship time." Kevin Davis, rating the album four and a half stars for New Release Today, describes, "These are very passionate worship songs sung with vocal sincerity and reverence with biblically based lyrics." Giving the album three and a half stars from Jesus Freak Hideout, mentioning, "There is an intelligence and a vision to this album that is lacking in most other projects that try the anthem-heavy approach, and it was not hard for me to appreciate this album."

Emmalee Manes, awarding the album three stars for Jesus Freak Hideout, recognizing, "They still have the power and upbeat-ness of the original album, as well as the chants of truth that listeners feel compelled to join in on, but there is a certain sincerity that they lack." Rating the album a four out of five from The Christian Beat, Sarah Baylor writes, "We Are is a beautiful masterpiece that rises as an anthem for us to sing to our Lord and Savior!" Jono Davies, giving the album five star for Louder Than the Music, says, "The City Harmonic seem to balance creative and catchy music so well." Giving the album a 4.2 out of five at Christian Music Review, Laura Chambers states, "We Are's mission is to help us become who we are by reminding us Whose we are."

== Track listing ==
Track list
No.	Title	Length
1.	"We Are One"	3:37
2.	"Maranatha"	4:26
3.	"In Your Arms"	3:57
4.	"Solid Rock"	2:55
5.	"Shout!"	4:01
6.	"Let There Be Light"	3:40
7.	"All of This and More"	4:07
8.	"Oh What Love"	4:58
9.	"Confession (Agnus Dei)"	4:26
10.	"Still and Small"	3:20
11.	"One"	4:26
Total length:		43:53

== Chart performance ==
Chart (2015)	Peak position
US Christian Albums (Billboard)	40
US Heatseekers Albums (Billboard)	25
