= Dan Bremnes =

- Born: Daniel Jobiah Bremnes; May 11, 1983 (age 42); Kamloops, British Columbia
- Origin: Salmon Arm, British Columbia
- Genres: Contemporary Christian music, worship, folk rock
- Occupation: Musician
- Instruments: Vocals, guitar, drums
- Years active: 2010–present
- Labels: Sparrow, Capitol CMG Curb-Word
- Website: danbremnes.com

Daniel Jobiah Bremnes (born May 11, 1983) is a Canadian Christian musician, guitarist, and drummer. He has released four studio albums, Your Strength (2010), Where the Light Is (2015), Wherever I Go (2019), and Into the Wild (2022), and four extended plays. He is signed with Curb Records.

== Early life ==
Bremnes was born as Daniel Jobiah Bremnes, on May 11, 1983, in Kamloops, British Columbia, to a pastor father, Norvil Bremnes, and to a mother, Lillis Bremnes, who owned a bed and breakfast, Amazing Acres. He has two siblings, Darcon and Darla. The Bremnes family moved to Salmon Arm, British Columbia in 1989, when his father established Living Waters Community Church, where Norvil was the pastor until January 2014. Bremnes' mother died in an automobile accident on September 14, 2006. Bremnes attended Salmon Arm Secondary School.

== Music career ==
His music career commenced in 2010, with his album, Your Strength, that was independently released. He then released two independent singles, "Hear Your Voice" in 2012 and "After All" in 2013. During this time, Bremnes released an extended play, Light My Way, which was independently released on September 25, 2012. The extended play and singles got him Covenant Awards at the 35th Annual Awards in 2013 for Male Vocalist of the Year and Music Video of the Year for "This Life". The subsequent year, Bremnes was awarded at the 36th Annual Awards for having the Pop/Contemporary Song of the Year and Recorded Song of the Year for "Beautiful", where he got the Male Vocalist of the Year along with Artist of the Year. He signed to Sparrow Records and Capitol CMG, where he released another single, "Beautiful", in 2014, along with an extended play on April 14, 2015, Where the Light Is. The song, "Beautiful", charted at a peak of No. 17 on the Billboard magazine Christian Songs chart. This was the precursor to his first studio album, Where the Light Is, released by Sparrow Records on June 9, 2015. In 2016, his recording contract was cancelled by Capitol. Bremnes continued to work on music, eventually signing a record deal with Curb Records and releasing his third studio album, Wherever I Go in 2019. The title track was released as a single and peaked at No. 19 on the US Billboard Hot Christian Songs chart.

== Discography ==
=== Studio albums ===
Title	Details	Chart positions
Title	Details	US Christ
Your Strength	Released: January 6, 2010; Label: Independent; Format: CD, LP, digital download	—
Where the Light Is	Released: June 9, 2015; Label: Sparrow/Capitol CMG/sixstepsrecords; Format: CD, LP, digital download	47
Wherever I Go	Released: April 5, 2019; Label: Word; Format: CD, digital download	—
Into the Wild	Released: June 17, 2022; Label: Word; Format: CD, digital download	—

=== EPs ===
List of EPs, with selected chart positions
Title	Album details	Peak chart positions	
Title	Album details	US Christ	US Heat
Light My Way	Released: September 25, 2012; Label: Independent; Format: CD, LP, digital download	—	—
Where the Light Is	Released: April 14, 2015; Label: Sparrow/Capitol CMG; Format: CD, LP, digital download	—	—
Wherever I Go	Released: September 7, 2018; Label: Bremnes Ventures Inc.; Format: CD, Digital download, streaming	40	10
Wherever I Go: Acoustic Sessions	Released: July 17, 2020; Label: Curb | Word Entertainment; Format: CD, Digital download, streaming	—	—
The Hero	Released: June 20, 2025; Label: Curb | Word Entertainment; Format: CD, Digital download, streaming	—	—
The Villain	Released: October 24, 2025; Label: Curb | Word Entertainment; Format: CD, Digital download, streaming	—	—

=== Singles ===
List of singles, with selected chart positions
Title	Year	Peak chart positions			Album
Title	Year	US Christ	US Christ Air.	US Christ AC	Album
"Beautiful"	2014	17	14	12	Where the Light Is
"Where the Light Is"	2015	—	39	—	Where the Light Is
"In His Hands"	2015	—	49	—	Where the Light Is
"Jingle All the Way"	2015	49	24	17	non-album singles
"Majesty (Here I Am)"	2017	—	—	—	non-album singles
"Going Together"	2018	—	—	—	Wherever I Go
"Up Again"	2018	16	12	14	Wherever I Go
"Wherever I Go"	2018	19	12	11	Wherever I Go
"Thunder"	2019	—	—	—	Wherever I Go
"Weakness"	2019	—	—	—	Wherever I Go
"Searching for Something"	2019	—	—	—	Wherever I Go
"Call Your Name"	2025	—	32	—	The Villain
