= Greg Kyllo =

Canadian politician

Deputy Speaker of the Legislative Assembly of British Columbia
- In office June 22, 2017 – September 2017
- Preceded by: Richard Lee

Member of the British Columbia Legislative Assembly for Shuswap
- In office May 14, 2013 – September 21, 2024
- Preceded by: George Abbott
- Succeeded by: David Williams (Salmon Arm-Shuswap)

Personal details
- Born: 1968 (age 57–58) Fort St. John, British Columbia
- Party: BC United

Gregory James Kyllo is a Canadian politician, who was elected to the Legislative Assembly of British Columbia in the 2013 provincial election, and was re-elected in 2017 and 2020. He represented the electoral district of Shuswap as a member of the BC United until 2024.

In government, he served as the Parliamentary Secretary for the BC Jobs Plan and as Deputy Speaker of the Legislature. In opposition, he has served as the critic for Jobs, Trade and Technology and, as of May 6, 2024, he serves as the Deputy Whip and Shadow Minister for Labour & Skills Training. On November 22, 2023, he announced he would not be seeking a fourth term in the Legislature.

Before entering politics at the provincial level, Kyllo served at the president and CEO of Twin Anchors Marine and TA Structures, based in Sicamous, British Columbia. He first became involved in politics by serving as deputy mayor of Sicamous, as well as councillor and member of the finance committee.

== Electoral record ==
2020 British Columbia general election: Shuswap
Party	Candidate	Votes	%	±%	Expenditures
Liberal	Greg Kyllo	13,300	51.35	−4.45	$52,230.75
New Democratic	Sylvia Lindgren	8,816	34.04	+7.09	$8,793.94
Green	Owen Madden	3,784	14.61	−1.10	$0.00
Total valid votes		25,900	100.00	–	
Total rejected ballots		213	0.82	+0.43	
Turnout		26,113	54.68	−8.12	
Registered voters		47,758			
Source: Elections BC

2017 British Columbia general election: Shuswap
Party	Candidate	Votes	%	±%	Expenditures
Liberal	Greg Kyllo	14,829	55.80	+7.88	$68,341
New Democratic	Sylvia Jean Lindgren	7,161	26.95	−2.62	$27,270
Green	Kevin Babcock	4,175	15.71	+6.37	$1,503
Libertarian	Kyle McCormack	410	1.54	–	$0
Total valid votes		26,575	100.00	–	
Total rejected ballots		103	0.39	+0.10	
Turnout		26,678	62.80	+2.39	
Registered voters		42,481			
Source: Elections BC

2013 British Columbia general election: Shuswap
Party	Candidate	Votes	%	±%
Liberal	Greg Kyllo	11,992	47.92	+1.30
New Democratic	Steve Gunner	7,398	29.57	−0.97
Conservative	Tom Birch	3,232	12.92	+2.64
Green	Chris George	2,338	9.34	−1.66
Advocational	Johanna Zalcik	63	0.25	NA
Total valid votes		25,023	100.00	
Total rejected ballots		74	0.29	
Turnout		25,097	60.41	
Source: Elections BC
