= Heart (The City Harmonic album) =

Studio album by The City Harmonic
- Released: September 3, 2013
- Genre: Christian rock, worship, indie rock
- Length: 46:31
- Label: Integrity
- Producer: The City Harmonic, Jared Fox

The City Harmonic chronology
I Have a Dream (It Feels Like Home) (2011)	Heart (2013)	We Are (2015)

Heart is the second studio album from Christian rock band The City Harmonic, which was released on September 3, 2013 through Integrity Media, and was produced by the band in association with Jared Fox. It received a nomination for Contemporary Christian/Gospel Album of the Year at the Juno Awards of 2014, but lost to Trees by Tim Neufeld.

== Background ==
The album, released on September 3, 2013, was the band's first studio album released through the Integrity Media label. The album was produced by The City Harmonic along with Jared Fox, who also worked with them on their debut album.

== Music and lyrics ==
Grace S. Aspinwall of CCM Magazine noted "This folk-infused album has little splashes of bluegrass within it, and it is a joy to hear." At Cross Rhythms, Joanna Costin said the album comes "with lyrics that speak of hope and grace." Ryan Barbee of Jesus Freak Hideout wrote from "Track one to fourteen is a journey of grief, hope, healing, celebration, and salvation." At Indie Vision Music, Jonathan Andre stated the effort is "Full of hope, wonder, encouragement and comfort". Emily Kjonaas of Christian Music Zine wrote "The songs on Heart are slow, melodic pieces, meant to bring the listener in to a time of worship." At Alt Rock Live, Jonathan Faulkner wrote "Musically, Heart picks up where their previous record left off but with several new treats for the listener", and that "lyrically the album gets better."

Joho Davies for Louder Than the Music wrote "The album mixes together great rock songs, heart warming ballads, interesting folk songs and soothing sounds that will leave the hairs on the back of your next on end." In addition, Davies highlighted that "'Heart' places Christ at the center while delving into themes of grace, discipleship and being, and becoming, truly human, all the while giving the listener permission to sing out in hope and in hurt." However, Rob Snyder of Alpha Omega News noted that "The lyrics are standard fair for the genre." At CM Addict, Brianne Bellomy wrote that the band "are known for their beautiful piano sounds, strong drum beats, and rousing gang lyrics. Their new album, Heart, has the same well known sounds but the lyrics... well they hit straight to the Heart."

== Critical reception ==
Professional ratings
Review scores
Source	Rating
Alpha Omega News	A−
Alt Rock Live	9/10 stars
CCM Magazine	3/5 stars
Christian Music Review	4/5 stars
Christian Music Zine	4.5/5 stars
CM Addict	5/5 stars
Cross Rhythms	10/10 squares
Indie Vision Music	4/5 stars
Jesus Freak Hideout	4.5/5 stars 3.5/5 stars
Louder Than the Music	5/5 stars
New Release Tuesday	3.5/5 stars 5/5 stars
Worship Leader	5/5 stars

Heart garnered critical acclaim from music critics. At CCM Magazine, Grace S. Aspinwall affirmed that "The project is relevant and delightful, albeit safe ground for the band." Joanna Costin for Cross Rhythms noted how "'Heart' is a rich listening experience" that "also adds a greater depth of feeling and passion." At Jesus Freak Hideout, Ryan Barbee evoked that "Heart is nothing less than breathtaking", which he wrote "there is no slump to be found on their latest release Heart, and to that he stated "Well done fellas, well done." Also, Jesus Freak Hideout's Mark Rice wrote that "Heart is overall a solid album and fans of modern worship and The City Harmonic will undoubtedly flock to it for good reason. A couple slip-ups prevent the album from being completely worth the anticipation many had for it, but [...] I'm sure most anyone who gets the album will be more than satisfied." At New Release Tuesday, Jonathan Francesco felt that "Heart excels where it's supposed to and reinvigorates the promise this band has shown in the past", and noted how the release "definitely comes full of such potential hits." Kevin Davis also of New Release Tuesday felt that "All of the songs are catchy, exciting and worshipful", and noted how it "challenged and entertained".

Jay Akins of Worship Leader felt that "With their Coldplay-resonant sound, The City Harmonic drops one of the most passionate and beautiful releases of the year." At Indie Vision Music, Jonathan Andre proclaimed that "Heart is an album to treasure as the year comes to a close in a few months." Christian Music Zine's Emily Kjonaas wrote that "fans will not be disappointed." At Alt Rock Live, Jonathan Faulkner said that "Yes, The City Harmonic has done it again", and told that "fans will not be disappointed." At Christian Music Review, Laura Chambers felt that "At the heart of Heart is God's heart for us and our hearts as changed and alive in Him." Jono Davies at Louder Than the Music called it "truly stunning", and told that for him "the band have created a second album that surpasses their first by miles." At Alpha Omega News, Rob Snyder found that "On HEART, we try to unpack what it means to be fully human." Brianne Bellomy of CM Addict felt that "this album is a beautiful reminder of the grace, peace, and love that God provides each of us in each and every heartbeat."

== Commercial performance ==
For the Billboard charting week of September 21, 2013, Heart was the No. 20 most sold album in the breaking and entry chart of the United States by the Top Heatseekers and was the No. 24 Top Christian Album.

== Track listing ==
All tracks are written by The City Harmonic except where noted below.

No.	Title	Writer(s)	Length
1.	"Here and There"		4:21
2.	"Praise the Lord"		3:16
3.	"Strong"		3:43
4.	"Take Heart"		3:47
5.	"Alive, Alive"		4:04
6.	"Love Heal Me"		2:01
7.	"Songs of Longing, Joy and Peace"		0:28
8.	"Glory"		3:09
9.	"A City on a Hill"	Benjamin Cantelon, Elias Elton Dummer, Nicholas Edward Herbert	3:39
10.	"Live Love"		3:01
11.	"1+1"		3:30
12.	"Long Walk Home"		3:35
13.	"Brand New"		3:37
14.	"My Jesus, I Love Thee"		4:20
Total length:			46:31

== Charts ==
Chart (2013)	Peak position
US Christian Albums (Billboard)	20
US Heatseekers Albums (Billboard)	24
