= I Have a Dream (It Feels Like Home) =

Studio album by the City Harmonic
- Released: October 18, 2011
- Genre: Christian rock, contemporary worship, indie rock
- Length: 45:00
- Label: Kingsway
- Producer: The City Harmonic, Jared Fox

The City Harmonic chronology
Introducing the City Harmonic EP (2010)	I Have a Dream (It Feels Like Home) (2011)	Heart (2013)

I Have a Dream (It Feels Like Home) is the debut studio album from Christian rock band the City Harmonic, which was released on October 18, 2011 by Kingsway Music, and produced by the City Harmonic in association with Jared Fox. The album received commercial charting success as well as critical acclaim. At the Juno Awards of 2013, the album won the award for Contemporary Christian/Gospel Album of the Year.

== Music and lyrics ==
Grace S. Aspinwall said that "With the first few notes, it's clear that comparisons to Coldplay ring true... but imitation is not all The City Harmonic has to offer", and noted that "What sets them apart from hipster-friendly acts like Arcade Fire and Mumford and Sons is their remarkably hopeful and faith-tinged lyrics" along with "Strong vocals and lilting instrumentation". At Jesus Freak Hideout, Ryan Barbee told that "Combining worship and the fight for justice, it is definitely not an album to be digested lightly", which "The words are honest, the music original, and the doctrine thick. If you are a worship leader in search of new congregational, and even personal, worship songs these are for you and your church. Scott Fryberger of Jesus Freak Hideout wrote that "It may be that they've created a sound that doesn't quite sound like every other worship album, but is still incredibly accessible at the same time."

At New Release Tuesday, Kelly Sheads wrote that "If Coldplay were a worship band, this is what they'd sound like. The City Harmonic has a sound unlike any other in Christian music today. So much so, I hesitate to even call them a band, but rather musicians because the quality of the music is so powerful. At times the music speaks louder than the lyrics themselves because it comes from the heart. Every song on this album has an extremely anthemic and full sound that continuously builds until coming to an abrupt end with the last note hanging in the balance." Kevin Davis also of New Release Tuesday noted that album comes "with lyrics that point to the wonders of our God combined with sweeping melodies and infectious choruses that will be replayed in your mind over and over again." In addition, Davis told that "All of the songs are catchy, exciting and worshipful", so this allows The City Harmonic a "great opportunity to reach the lost for the Kingdom of God with their transparent lyrics and incredible musical talent."

Keith Settles of Indie Vision Music said that "From start to finish every song is full of worshipful content that not only will get listeners to raise their hands in praise but glorify God the way that He intended. Full of great melody and great lyrics and good music". Furthermore, Settles stated that the "vocals and how they blend well with the music", and this "Musically this album reminds me of something that hymn writers would write with a modern touch." Tony Cummings of Cross Rhythms evoked that "these are songs that are designed for congregational worship yet the multi-layered production ensures that they make for repeated play on your home sound system." At Christianity Today, Joel Oliphint noted how the band "takes cues from Coldplay and other anthemic rock bands, though the City Harmonic's lyrics are a cut above some other worship bands following the same trend." Dave Wood at Louder Than the Music said that this album was "Oozing talent, brilliant musicianship, huge sounding rock songs". At Christian Music Zine, Tyler Hess told that this album has a "deep atmospheric sound that borders on being indie rock mixed with a worshipful heart", and they prove "that lyrics don’t always have to leave it to the imagination to stir emotions." Jonathan Kemp of The Christian Music Review Blog wrote that "The music is so solid and Elias' voice is so superb."

== Critical reception ==
Professional ratings
Review scores
Source	Rating
Alpha Omega News	A
Alt Rock Live	8/10 stars
CCM Magazine	4/5 stars
The Christian Music Review Blog	5/5 stars
Christian Music Zine	4.5/5 stars
Christianity Today	3/5 stars
Cross Rhythms	9/10 stars
Indie Vision Music	4/5 stars
Jesus Freak Hideout	4/5 stars
Jesus Freak Hideout	3.5/5 stars
Louder Than the Music	5/5 stars
New Release Tuesday	4/5 stars
New Release Tuesday	4.5/5 stars

I Have a Dream (It Feels Like Home) garnered critical acclaim from music critics to critique the album. At CCM Magazine, Grace S. Aspinwall stated that the album was "fabulous", and noted that "Following up their acclaimed Introducing EP, they prove here that they are no one-hit wonder." Ryan Barbee at Jesus Freak Hideout proclaimed that "This album is sure to establish The City Harmonic as not just another band, but as a movement of new worship artists." In addition, Scott Fryberger of Jesus Freak Hideout felt that "The City Harmonic does a fairly good job of bringing something fresh to the table with their debut. While it's not a stunning album, it's not bad either." At New Release Tuesday, Kelly Sheads highlighted that "This leaves the song feeling unfinished, but perhaps that’s the point. We’re not home yet and until we are, we will never feel complete." Also, Kevin Davis of New Release Tuesday affirmed that this "completely rocks and is loaded with songs you can proudly share with your friends and family."

At Indie Vision Music, Keith Settles told that the band "have put together a great album." Joel Oliphint of Christianity Today alluded to how "The album starts off remarkably strong and meanders a bit in the middle, but it's a worthwhile addition to the ever-growing Coldplay-as-worship canon." At Louder Than the Music, Dave Wood proclaimed this "An absolute gem of an album", which meant that this is "A band to be reckoned with, it's hard to believe this is their full length debut", and told that "If this band don't go on to become one of the best in Christian music, then there is simply no justice." Tyler Hess of Christian Music Zine evoked that the release "is just about as good as it gets and deserves proper attention." At Alt Rock Live, Jonathan Faulkner noted that "It’s clear that The City Harmonic didn’t fail to pull out all the stops for their first full length studio album I Have a Dream (It feels like home). This debut could mark the beginning of a very promising career within the Christian Music Industry." Rob Snyder of Alpha Omega News felt that "The record is outstanding both lyrically and sonically." At The Christian Music Review Blog, Jonathan Kemp told that he was "absolutely wowed" by the release.

== Commercial performance ==
For the Billboard charting week of November 5, 2011, I Have a Dream (It Feels Like Home) was the No. 6 most sold album in the breaking and entry chart of the United States by the Top Heatseekers and was the No. 34 Top Christian Album.

== Track listing ==
All tracks are written by The City Harmonic.

No.	Title	Length
1.	"Yours"	4:36
2.	"Spark"	4:49
3.	"Mountaintop"	4:05
4.	"Fall Apart"	4:29
5.	"Be Still, O My Soul"	3:23
6.	"Wake Me Up"	4:51
7.	"I Have a Dream (It Feels Like Home)"	4:12
8.	"La Rêve"	1:44
9.	"Love"	2:48
10.	"Holy (Wedding Day)" (featuring JJ Heller)	4:17
11.	"Benediction"	1:42
12.	"Manifesto [Radio Edit]"	4:04
Total length:		45:00

== Charts ==
Chart (2011)	Peak position
US Top Christian Albums (Billboard)	34
US Heatseekers Albums (Billboard)	6
