= Shannon O'Neill (politician) =

Canadian politician (1936–2024)

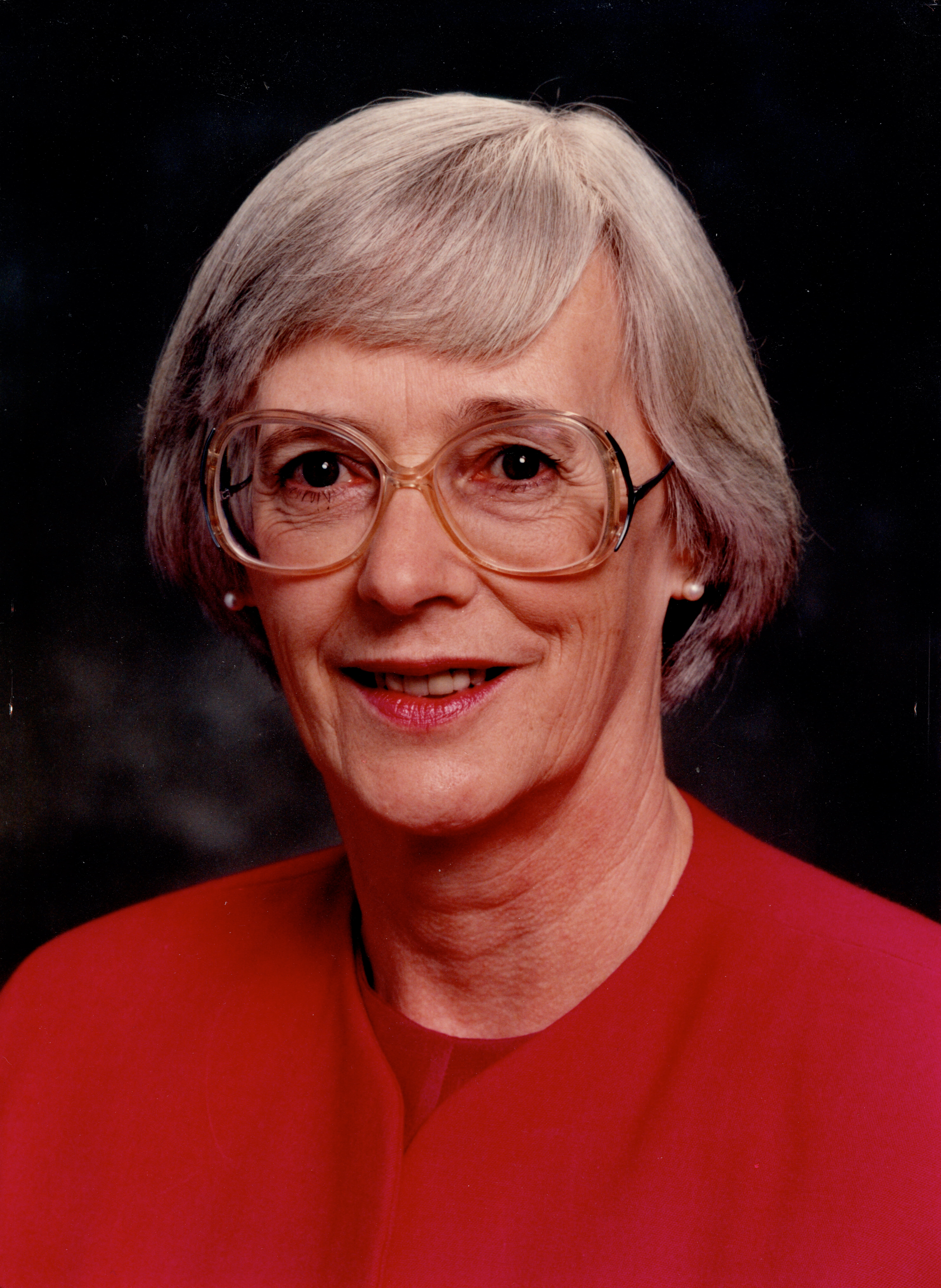

MLA for Shuswap
- In office 1991–1996

Personal details
- Born: August 13, 1936
- Died: June 12, 2024 (aged 87) Shuswap Lake General Hospital
- Party: British Columbia New Democratic Party

Shannon Edith O'Neill (August 13, 1936 – June 12, 2024), was a Canadian politician. She served in the Legislative Assembly of British Columbia from her election in 1991 to her retirement in 1996, as an NDP member for the constituency of Shuswap. Ms. O'Neill died June 12, 2024.
