= The City Harmonic =

Canadian Christian rock band

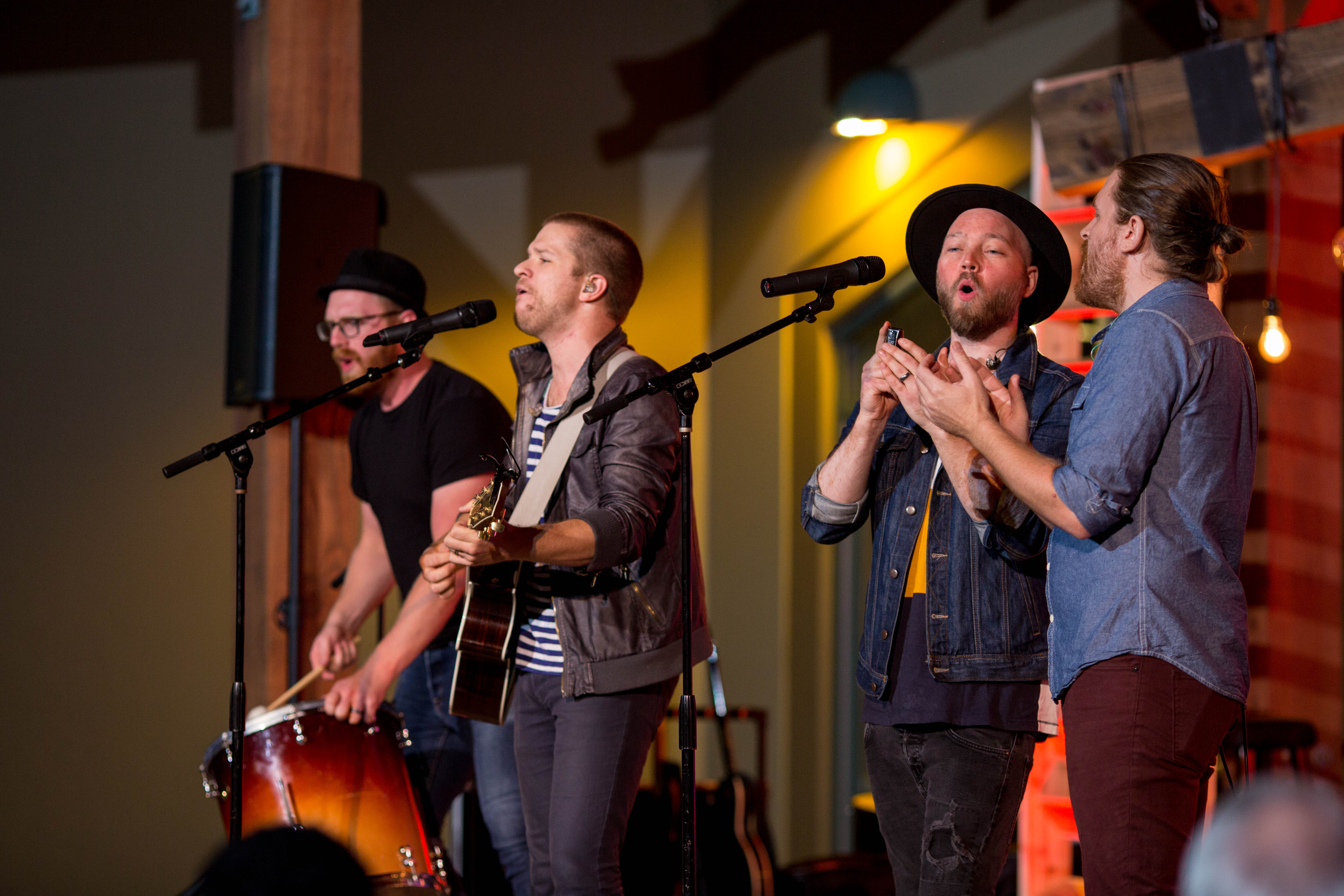
- The City Harmonic in 2015

Background information
- Origin: Hamilton, Ontario, Canada
- Genres: Christian rock; worship music; alternative rock; indie rock
- Years active: 2009–2017
- Labels: Kingsway, Integrity
- Past members: Elias Dummer; Eric Fusilier; Aaron Powell; Josh Vanderlaan
- Website: thecityharmonic.com

The City Harmonic was a Canadian Christian rock band based in Hamilton, Ontario. Elias Dummer (vocals, keyboards, guitar), Eric Fusilier (bass), Aaron Powell (guitar), and Josh Vanderlaan (drums) collectively made up The City Harmonic.

Their music has been described as "nostalgic Brit-pop meets campfire sing-along mix that features raucous gang vocals along with agile, soaring anthems crafted to include the listener". Musically, their sound is often compared to artists like Coldplay, Keane, Aqualung, the Fray, or Arcade Fire.

In 2011, they won three Covenant Awards from GMA Canada for New Artist of the Year, Recorded Song of the Year and Modern Worship Song of the Year. In 2013, they won Covenant Awards for Group of the Year and Praise and Worship Song of the Year. They also won a Juno Award for the 2013 Christian/Contemporary Gospel Album of the Year. After announcing that they would retire, the band recorded their final show, which was released as a live album, Benediction (Live), on June 23, 2017.

== History ==
The City Harmonic formed in 2009 after its members served together as the house worship band for an inter-denominational "worship and mission" event for students in Hamilton. The band released their debut EP, Introducing the City Harmonic, in November 2010 in Canada and the United States. Their début single, "Manifesto" appeared in the charts in several categories. "Manifesto" remained on Billboard's Christian charts for 15 weeks and was featured as the walk-up song for then-Oakland Athletics outfielder Seth Smith. The EP was also released in January 2011 in Britain.

The band released their first full-length album titled I Have a Dream (It Feels Like Home) on October 18, 2011. On November 5, 2011 it peaked at No. 34 on Billboard's Christian Albums chart, and at No. 6 on the Heatseekers Albums chart. A song from this album, "Holy (Wedding Day)", was released on September 21, 2012. As of January 22, 2012 it had reached No. 39 on the Billboard Christian Songs chart and had the fifth biggest jump.

The group was nominated for a 2012 GMA Dove Award for "New Artist of the Year".

On April 20, 2013, the band won a Juno award for Christian/Contemporary Gospel Album of the Year.

The band released their second full-length album titled Heart on September 3, 2013. In the week of release in Canada it reached No. 1 on the Inspirational Albums Charts. For the Billboard charting week of September 21, 2013, Heart No. 20 on the Top Heatseekers chart and No. 24 Top Christian Albums chart. Critically speaking, Heart had been the most critically well-received of the band's releases to date. The album artwork features an adaptation of Leonardo da Vinci's Vitruvian Man, with Jesus on the cross in the center.

After announcing its release during an appearance and performance on NBC's Beyond A.D., the band released their third full-length album titled We Are on September 4, 2015. Well received by critics. The album reached No. 1 on the Inspirational Albums Charts in Canada, and appeared on Billboard on both the Heatseekers and Christian and Gospel Albums charts. The album is focused on the band's origins and addresses the themes of unity in the Church and the movement of churches that brought them together. In addition to their appearance on NBC, the band have performed songs from this album on the Relevant Podcast as well as on the 10,000th episode of 100 Huntley Street on YES TV.

Released concurrently with the album of the same name, the documentary, We Are the City Harmonic: The Movie, was filmed and directed by Jesse Hunt of Cycle films, and tells the story of the movement of Christian unity in Hamilton, Ontario that brought the band together. It was released free to YouTube as well as the band's own domains.

The City Harmonic disbanded in 2017. They recorded their final show in their hometown of Hamilton, Ontario, and released the recording as an album, Benediction (Live). The album was released to critical acclaim, with Jesus Freak Hideout describing it as "quite possibly the best worship release this year."

== Lineup ==
Members

- Elias Elton Dummer – vocals, keyboards, guitar (2009–2017)
- Eric Morgan Fusilier – bass, vocals (2009–2016)
- Aaron Christian Powell – guitar, vocals (2009–2017)
- Josh Alexander Vanderlaan – drums (2009–2017)

Touring musicians

- Steve Lensink – bass, guitar, vocals (2012–2014, 2016–2017)
- Jason Lackey – bass (2016)
- Justin Brix – guitar, keys, vocals (2017)
- Brooke Nicholls – vocals (2017)

== Discography ==
=== Albums ===
- Introducing the City Harmonic EP (2010)
- I Have a Dream (It Feels Like Home) (2011) Released on October 18, 2011
- Heart (2013) September 3, 2013
- We Are (2015) September 4, 2015
- Benediction (Live) (2017) June 23, 2017

=== Singles ===
Year	Single	Peak chart positions	Album	Sales
Year	Single	US Christ	Album	Sales
2010	"Manifesto"	19	Introducing the City Harmonic	US: 100,000
2011	"I Have a Dream"	15	I Have a Dream (It Feels Like Home)	
2012	"Mountaintop"	27	I Have a Dream (It Feels Like Home)	
2012	"Holy (Wedding Day)"	36	I Have a Dream (It Feels Like Home)	
2013	"A City on a Hill"	—	Heart	
2014	"Praise the Lord"	46	Heart	
2015	"We Are One"	—	We Are	
2016	"Let There Be Light"	—	We Are	

== Awards ==
GMA Covenant Awards

Year	Award	Result
2011	New Artist of the Year	Won
2011	Modern Worship Song of the Year ("Manifesto")	Won
2011	Recorded Song of the Year ("Manifesto")	Won
2011	Praise and Worship Song of the Year ("My God")	Nominated
2011	Song of the Year ("Manifesto")	Nominated
2012	Praise and Worship Song of the Year ("I Have a Dream (It Feels Like Home)")	Won
2012	CD Artwork Design of the Year ("I Have a Dream (It Feels Like Home)")	Nominated
2012	Modern Worship Song of the Year ("Mountaintop")	Nominated
2012	Recorded Song of the Year ("I Have a Dream (It Feels Like Home)")	Nominated
2012	Song of the Year ("I Have a Dream (It Feels Like Home)")	Nominated
2012	Video of the Year ("I Have a Dream (It Feels Like Home)")	Nominated
2013	Group of the Year	Won
2013	Artist of the Year	Nominated
2013	Praise and Worship Song of the Year ("Holy (Wedding Day)")	Won
2013	Music Video of the Year ("Holy (Wedding Day)")	Nominated
2014	Group of the Year	Nominated
2014	Album of the Year (HEART)	Nominated
2014	Artist of the Year	Nominated
2014	Song of the Year ("Praise The Lord")	Nominated
2014	Praise & Worship Song of the Year ("Praise The Lord")	Nominated
2014	Praise & Worship Album of the Year ("HEART")	Nominated
2015	Group of the Year	Won
2015	Collaboration of the Year	Won
2015	Rap Song of the Year (Collaboration)	Won
2016	Group of the Year	Nominated
2016	Praise & Worship Album Of The Year ("WE ARE")	Nominated
2018	Group of the Year	Nominated
2018	Album of the Year "Benediction (Live)"	Nominated
2018	Praise & Worship Album of the Year "Benediction (Live)"	Won
2018	Praise & Worship Song of the Year "Honestly"	Won

JUNO Awards

Year	Award	Result
2013	Contemporary Christian and Gospel Album of the Year (I Have A Dream (It Feels Like Home))	Won
2014	Contemporary Christian and Gospel Album of the Year (HEART)	Nominated
2015	Contemporary Christian and Gospel Album of the Year (We Are)	Nominated

Dove Awards

Year	Award	Result
2012	New Artist of the Year	Nominated
