= Wherever I Go (Dan Bremnes song) =

2018 single by Dan Bremnes

Single by Dan Bremnes

from the album Wherever I Go
- Released: 2018
- Recorded: 2017–2018
- Genre: CEDM
- Length: 2:58
- Label: Bremnes Ventures
- Songwriters: Dan Bremnes; Bryan Fowler
- Producers: Bryan Fowler; Mike Wise

Dan Bremnes singles chronology
"Up Again" (2018)	"Wherever I Go" (2018)	"Thunder" (2019)

Music video
- "Wherever I Go" on YouTube

"Wherever I Go" is the third single, released in 2018 from Dan Bremnes's album of the same name.

== Composition ==
"Wherever I Go" is originally in the key of D♭ Minor, with a tempo of 89 beats per minute.

== Music video ==
A music video for the single "Wherever I Go" was released on July 13, 2018. The video shows Bremnes travelling the world while singing the song. The video has over two million views on YouTube.

== Charts ==
=== Weekly charts ===
Chart (2018)	Peak position
US Hot Christian Songs (Billboard)	19
US Christian Airplay (Billboard)	12
US Christian AC (Billboard)	11
US Christian AC Indicator (Billboard)	8

=== Year-end charts ===
Chart (2018)	Peak position
US Christian Songs (Billboard )	53
US Christian Airplay (Billboard)	40

Chart (2019)	Position
US Christian Songs (Billboard)	81
US Christian AC Indicator (Billboard)	49
