= Where the Light Is (EP) =

Where the Light Is EP

EP by Dan Bremnes
- Released: April 15, 2015
- Genres: Contemporary Christian music, worship, folk rock
- Length: 21:04
- Labels: Sparrow, Capitol CMG

Dan Bremnes chronology
| Light My Way (2012) | Where the Light Is EP (2015) | Where the Light Is (2015) |

Where the Light Is is the second extended play (EP) from Dan Bremnes. Sparrow Records alongside Capitol Christian Music Group released the EP on April 15, 2015.

== Critical reception ==
Professional ratings
Review scores
| Source | Rating |
|---|---|
| 365 Days of Inspiring Media | 4/5 stars |
| Christian Music Review | 4.7/5 |
| Jesus Freak Hideout | 2.5/5 stars |
| New Release Tuesday | 4/5 stars |
| The Sound Opinion | 3/5 stars |

Awarding the EP four stars from New Release Tuesday, Mary Nikkel states, "Dan Bremnes proves his ability to craft melodies and lyrics that are as musically strong as they are spiritually and emotionally engaging." Christopher Smith, giving the EP two and a half stars for Jesus Freak Hideout, writes, "anyone looking for an engaging or artistic album won't find it here." Rating the album three stars at The Sound Opinion, Lindsay Williams says, "Once listeners preview Where The Light Is, Canada’s best kept secret will be out. Bremnes possesses too much talent for Canadians to keep him all to themselves." Giving the album four stars for 365 Days of Inspiring Media, Joshua Andre writes, "Well done Dan for these six songs of wisdom, clarity and timely restoration." Kelly Meade, rating the album a 4.7 out of five from Christian Music Review, states, "Throughout the album, 'Where The Light Is reiterates the fact that no matter where we’ve been in the past, God is able and will be faithful to fulfill the promise of 2 Corinthians 5:17".

== Track listing ==
| No. | Title | Writer(s) | Length |
|---|---|---|---|
| 1. | "Where the Light Is" | Dan Bremnes, Ben Glover | 3:52 |
| 2. | "Heart on Fire" | Bremnes, David Garcia, Glover | 3:52 |
| 3. | "Beautiful" | Bremnes, Ed Cash, Scott Cash, Garcia, Glover | 3:42 |
| 4. | "He Knows" | Bremnes, Christopher Stevens | 3:21 |
| 5. | "Born Again (Acoustic Version)" | Bremnes, Jeff Pardo | 3:02 |
| 6. | "Even If" | Bremnes | 3:15 |
| Total length: | | | 21:04 |
