= Where the Light Is (Dan Bremnes album) =

Studio album by Dan Bremnes
- Released: June 9, 2015
- Genre: Contemporary Christian music, worship, rock, alternative rock, folk, folk rock
- Length: 38:48
- Label: Sparrow, Capitol CMG

Dan Bremnes chronology
Where the Light Is EP (2015)	Where the Light Is (2015)

Where the Light Is is the second studio album by Dan Bremnes. Sparrow Records alongside Capitol Christian Music Group released the album on June 9, 2015.

== Critical reception ==
Professional ratings
Review scores
Source	Rating
365 Days of Inspiring Media	4/5 stars
CCM Magazine	4/5 stars
The Christian Beat	3.8/5
Christian Music Review	4.7/5
Cross Rhythms	10/10 squares
Jesus Wired	9.5/10 stars
Louder Than the Music	3.5/5 stars
New Release Today	4.5/5 stars
Worship Leader	4.5/5 stars

Awarding the album four stars for CCM Magazine, Matt Conner states, "Dan Bremnes has followed suit with an even stronger full-length filled with memorable tunes", where he's "Coming full-circle, now as a new father himself, this release and promising future is ever-so timely." Caitlin Lassiter, rating the album four and a half stars from New Release Today, describes, "Where The Light Is definitely doesn't have the feel of a debut album. From start to finish, this project presents effortless talent and a smooth set of skills like that of a much more seasoned artist." Signaling in a perfect ten review for Cross Rhythms, Jonathan Harris says, "Both musically and lyrically, this album is exceptional." Randy W. Cross, indicating in a four and a half star review from Worship Leader, states, "Thought-provoking, introspective lyrics join the upbeat, infectious grooves to make this a must have CD for your pop Christian music diet", with "a perfect blend within the pop variety of radio-friendly Christian music."

Philip Aldis, giving the album three and a half stars at Louder Than the Music, writes, "Take some time to read the lyrics, and consider them. Dan is bold enough to say many times this is me: do you feel the same? It's worth a listen, to refer yourself into the reality clinic for a spiritual health check." Rating the album four stars from 365 Days of Inspiring Media, Joshua Andre says, "Well done Dan for these eleven songs of wisdom, clarity and timely restoration". Kelly Meade, signaling in a 4.7 out of five review by Christian Music Review, describes, "Where The Light Is features songs we all can relate to in one way or another." Awarding the album nine and a half stars for Jesus Wired, Rebekah Joy states, "Where the Light Is is a phenomenal album." Lauren McLean, indicating in a 3.8 review at The Christian Beat, recognizes, "you can easily hear the Gospel influence in each line of each song."

== Track listing ==
No.	Title	Writer(s)	Length
1.	"Where the Light Is"	Dan Bremnes, Ben Glover	3:52
2.	"Beautiful"	Bremnes, Ed Cash, Scott Cash, David Garcia, Glover	3:41
3.	"Heart on Fire"	Bremnes, Garcia, Glover	3:52
4.	"In His Hands"	Bremnes, E. Cash, S. Cash	3:54
5.	"Born Again"	Bremnes, Jeff Pardo	3:04
6.	"He Knows"	Bremnes, Christopher Stevens	3:20
7.	"Wide Open"	Bremnes, E. Cash, S. Cash	3:30
8.	"Faith Is"	Bremnes, Mia Fields, Seth Mosley	2:56
9.	"Over"	Bremnes, Garcia, Glover	3:24
10.	"I Am Sure"	Bremnes, Pardo, Justin Ebach	3:25
11.	"At Your Feet (Surrender)"	Bremnes, E. Cash, S. Cash, Ben Fielding, Katherine Langridge	3:50
Total length:			38:48

== Charts ==
Chart (2015)	Peak position
US Christian Albums (Billboard)	47
