= Salmon Arm =

- City
- City of Salmon Arm
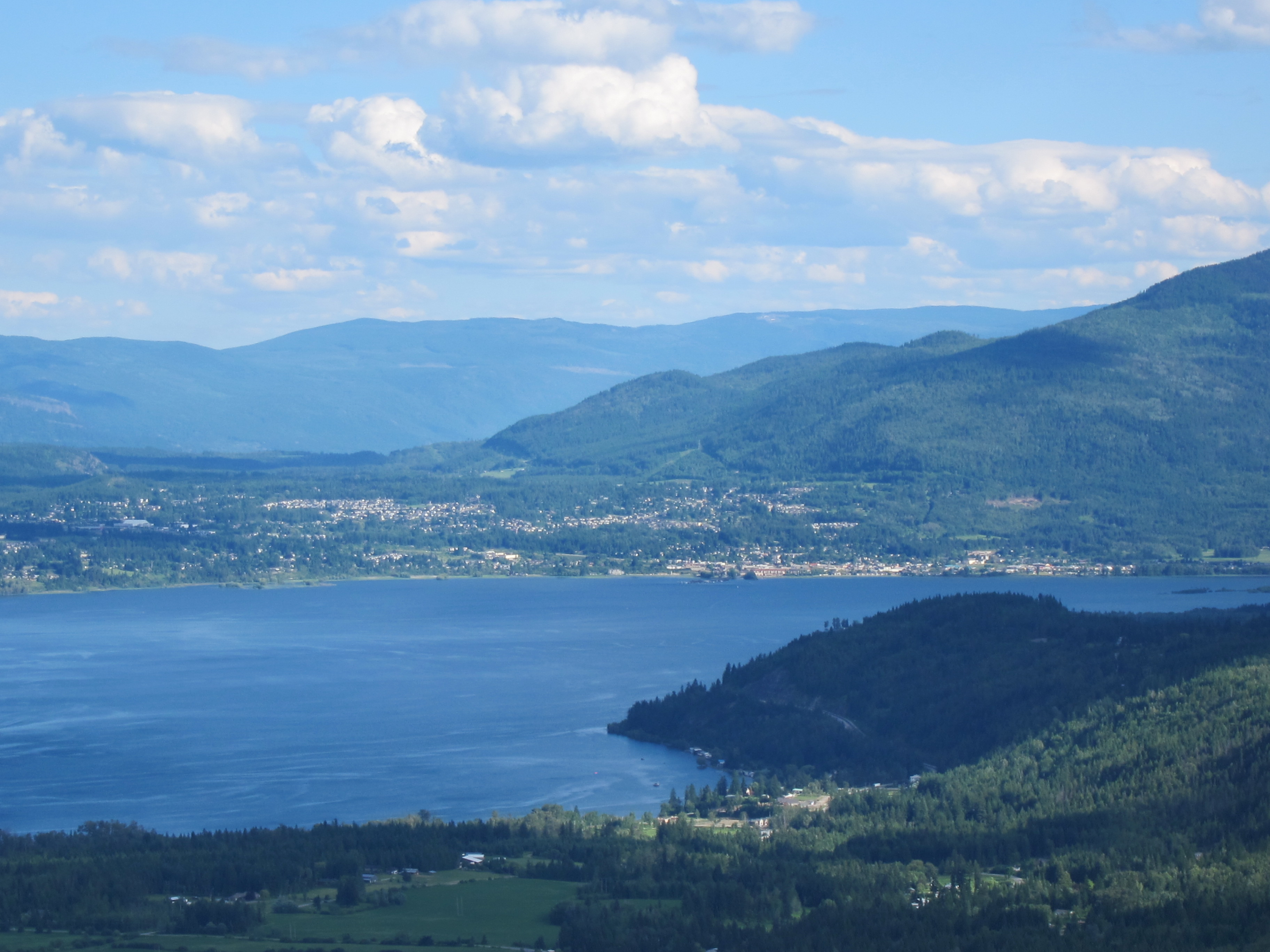
- Salmon Arm and Shuswap Lake

- Location of Salmon Arm Salmon Arm (Canada)
- Coordinates: 50°42′8″N 119°16′20″W
- Country: Canada
- Province: British Columbia
- Region: Shuswap Country
- Regional District: Columbia-Shuswap
- Established: 1905

Government
  - Mayor: Alan Harrison
  - Governing Body: Salmon Arm City Council
  - MP: Mel Arnold
  - MLA: David Williams

Area
  - City: 155.19 km^{2} (59.92 sq mi)
  - Metro: 165.57 km^{2} (63.93 sq mi)
- Elevation: 415 m (1,362 ft)

Population (2021)
  - City: 19,432
  - Density: 125.2/km^{2} (324/sq mi)
  - Urban: 16,065
  - Metro: 19,705
  - Metro density: 119.1/km^{2} (308/sq mi)
- Time zone: UTC−07:00 (PT)
- Forward sortation area: V1E
- Area codes: 250, 778, 236, 672
- Highways: Trans-Canada Highway Highway 1
- Website: salmonarm.ca

Salmon Arm is a city in the Columbia Shuswap Regional District of the Southern Interior of the Canadian province of British Columbia that has a population of 19,432 (2021). Salmon Arm was incorporated as a municipal district on May 15, 2005. The city of Salmon Arm separated from the district in 1912, but was downgraded to a village in 1958. The city of Salmon Arm once again reunited with the District Municipality in 1970. Salmon Arm once again became a city in 2005, and is now the location of the head offices of the Columbia-Shuswap Regional District. It is a tourist town in the summer, connected to all 4 arms of Shuswap Lake, with many beaches, numerous golf courses, camping facilities, and house boat rentals. Salmon Arm is home to the longest wooden freshwater wharf in North America.

== Etymology ==
Salmon Arm takes its name from its place along Shuswap Lake. The lake has four "arms": Shuswap Arm in the west, Seymour Arm in the north, Anstey Arm in the northeast, and Salmon Arm in the south, named after the large runs of salmon that used to run up the creeks that empty into the lake. The city of Salmon Arm takes its name from its location along the Salmon Arm of Shuswap Lake.

== History ==
Following the laying of the Canadian Pacific Railway in September 1885, Salmon Arm began to develop. While miners and settlers looked for gold in the surrounding areas, the beaches of Salmon Arm lay virtually untouched. The town had grown to include many new buildings such as two general stores, a school, and a hotel by the end of the 1890s. The population had also grown to include over 200 citizens.

Salmon Arm soon acquired a reputation for having an excellent fruit harvest. The local businessmen grew fruit as a main export, sending it to the larger, more populated towns that surrounded it. A formal local government was started at the request of its citizens in May 1905. Salmon Arm upgraded its town status to an official city in 1912.

Princess Elizabeth, Duchess of Edinburgh and Prince Philip, Duke of Edinburgh visited Salmon Arm in 1951 while on a royal tour of Canada.

While Prime Minister, Pierre Trudeau and his sons passed through Salmon Arm on August 8, 1982, they were confronted by three demonstrators protesting "high unemployment and the way the Prime Minister was handling the economy." Trudeau infamously gave the protesters the finger; his gesture was caught on a single television camera and immediately used by some as, "a vivid symbol for those who thought the Liberal prime minister arrogant and hostile to Western Canada." However, to many Trudeau's response was seen as a commemorated joke. Only a month after the incident T-shirts, which depicted a caricature of Trudeau leaning out of a train with his middle finger raised, were being produced and sold to the citizens of Salmon Arm.

A wildfire started by lightning occurred southwest of Salmon Arm in 1998, which burned an area of 13,500-acre (5,500 ha), causing significant deforestation. The fire came down from the Fly Hills in the west and embers carried by the wind jumped the valley and ignited Mount Ida. Flames raced down both sides of the valley, threatening many homes. An emergency evacuation was executed as the fire got closer.

As the fire reached the valley floor, a sudden change of wind direction forced the fire back on itself, extinguishing it. The fire came so close that trees in many backyards were singed and barn paint was peeled. The media reported "20 homes and 15 barns" were destroyed during the firestorm in the Silver Creek area to the south of Salmon Arm, which also produced Canada's largest civil evacuation up to that date when the "5,000-hectare forest fire that forced the removal of 7,000 residents of Salmon Arm was being blown toward the town."

== Geography ==
Salmon Arm is on the shores of Shuswap Lake, where the Salmon River empties into the Salmon Arm reach of the Lake. Directly south of the city lies Mount Ida, to the west Fly Hills, and across Shuswap Lake lies Bastion Mountain.

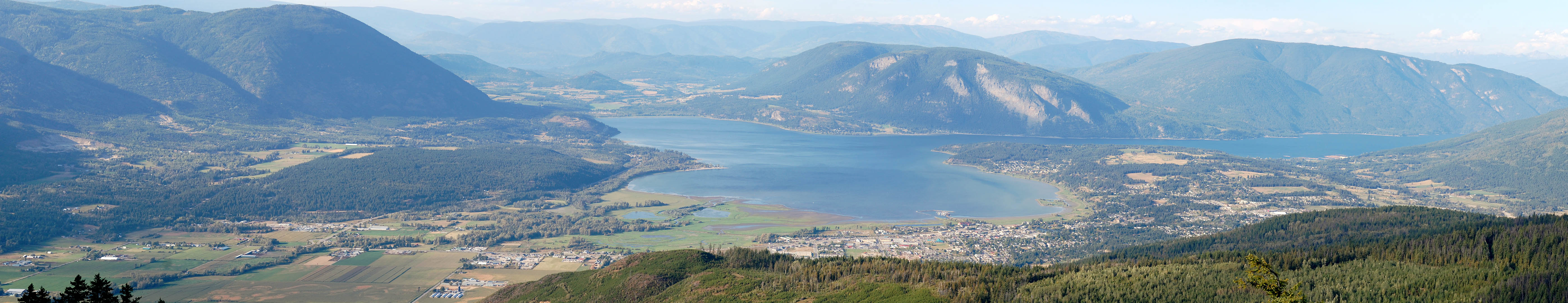
A view from Mt. Ida overlooking Salmon Arm and Shuswap Lake

== Climate ==
With a January mean of −2.6 °C (27.3 °F) and a July mean of 20.6 °C (69.1 °F), Salmon Arm has a warm-summer humid continental climate (Köppen: Dfb) or an inland oceanic climate (Cfb) with strong maritime influences as a result of its relative proximity to the Pacific Ocean.

Climate data for Salmon Arm; 1991–2020 normals
Month	Jan	Feb	Mar	Apr	May	Jun	Jul	Aug	Sep	Oct	Nov	Dec	Year
Record high °C (°F)	14.5 (58.1)	14 (57)	19 (66)	28.5 (83.3)	34 (93)	42.9 (109.2)	39.9 (103.8)	39 (102)	34 (93)	25.5 (77.9)	15.5 (59.9)	9 (48)	42.9 (109.2)
Mean daily maximum °C (°F)	0.6 (33.1)	3.3 (37.9)	9.3 (48.7)	15.5 (59.9)	21.1 (70.0)	24.1 (75.4)	28.3 (82.9)	27.6 (81.7)	21.4 (70.5)	12.8 (55.0)	5.5 (41.9)	0.9 (33.6)	14.2 (57.5)
Daily mean °C (°F)	−2.6 (27.3)	−0.9 (30.4)	3.9 (39.0)	8.9 (48.0)	14.1 (57.4)	17.3 (63.1)	20.6 (69.1)	19.7 (67.5)	14.5 (58.1)	7.7 (45.9)	2.2 (36.0)	−2.1 (28.2)	8.6 (47.5)
Mean daily minimum °C (°F)	−5.6 (21.9)	−5.1 (22.8)	−1.5 (29.3)	2.3 (36.1)	7.0 (44.6)	10.5 (50.9)	12.8 (55.0)	11.7 (53.1)	7.5 (45.5)	2.6 (36.7)	−1.2 (29.8)	−4.9 (23.2)	3.0 (37.4)
Record low °C (°F)	−31.5 (−24.7)	−27 (−17)	−19 (−2)	−7 (19)	−3 (27)	−0.5 (31.1)	3.5 (38.3)	2.5 (36.5)	−6 (21)	−18 (0)	−32 (−26)	−33.5 (−28.3)	−33.5 (−28.3)
Average precipitation mm (inches)	78.1 (3.07)	37.3 (1.47)	39.4 (1.55)	40.5 (1.59)	53.4 (2.10)	64.3 (2.53)	43.0 (1.69)	35.2 (1.39)	40.8 (1.61)	61.1 (2.41)	83.1 (3.27)	77.5 (3.05)	653.7 (25.73)
Average rainfall mm (inches)	10.0 (0.39)	14.5 (0.57)	28.5 (1.12)	39.3 (1.55)	56.9 (2.24)	66.2 (2.61)	44.5 (1.75)	36.5 (1.44)	41.6 (1.64)	60.4 (2.38)	56.2 (2.21)	11.9 (0.47)	466.5 (18.37)
Average snowfall cm (inches)	68.6 (27.0)	22.1 (8.7)	11.6 (4.6)	0.8 (0.3)	0.0 (0.0)	0.0 (0.0)	0.0 (0.0)	0.0 (0.0)	0.0 (0.0)	0.3 (0.1)	28.0 (11.0)	71.3 (28.1)	202.7 (79.8)
Average precipitation days (≥ 0.2 mm)	13.2	7.5	10.2	10.6	11.3	12.6	9.5	7.8	8.6	13.4	15.6	13.8	134.1
Average rainy days (≥ 0.2 mm)	1.9	3.3	8.4	10.4	11.7	12.7	9.2	7.8	8.6	13.1	11.2	2.6	100.9
Average snowy days (≥ 0.2 cm)	11.3	4.8	2.6	0.26	0.0	0.0	0.0	0.0	0.0	0.14	5.1	12.1	36.3
Average relative humidity (%) (at 15:00 LST)	82.2	73.2	59.8	48.3	49.7	52.9	45.7	45.6	54.3	67.5	78.3	82.1	61.6
Source: Environment and Climate Change Canada

== Demographics ==
Historical population
Year	Pop.	±%
1921	967	—
1931	1,671	+72.8%
1941	1,786	+6.9%
1951	2,389	+33.8%
1956	3,100	+29.8%
1961	4,007	+29.3%
1966	4,801	+19.8%
1971	7,793	+62.3%
1976	9,391	+20.5%
1981	10,780	+14.8%
1986	11,199	+3.9%
1991	12,115	+8.2%
1996	14,664	+21.0%
2001	15,210	+3.7%
2006	16,012	+5.3%
2011	17,464	+9.1%
2016	17,706	+1.4%
2021	19,432	+9.7%
Sources: Statistics Canada

In the 2021 Census of Population conducted by Statistics Canada, Salmon Arm had a population of 19,432 living in 8,106 of its 8,517 total private dwellings, a change of 9.7% from its 2016 population of 17,706. With a land area of 155.19 km^{2} (59.92 sq mi), it had a population density of 125.2/km^{2} (324.3/sq mi) in 2021.

=== Ethnicity ===
Panethnic groups in the City of Salmon Arm (2001−2021)
Panethnic group	2021		2016		2011		2006		2001	
Panethnic group	Pop.	%	Pop.	%	Pop.	%	Pop.	%	Pop.	%
European (Note: Statistic includes all persons that did not make up part of a visible minority or an indigenous identity.)	16,185	86.92%	15,260	89.61%	15,515	92%	14,600	93.86%	14,075	94.05%
Indigenous	1,410	7.57%	1,115	6.55%	1,010	5.99%	765	4.92%	560	3.74%
East Asian (Note: Statistic includes total responses of "Chinese", "Korean", and "Japanese" under visible minority section on census.)	305	1.64%	260	1.53%	165	0.98%	55	0.35%	195	1.3%
Southeast Asian (Note: Statistic includes total responses of "Filipino" and "Southeast Asian" under visible minority section on census.)	245	1.32%	110	0.65%	70	0.42%	30	0.19%	30	0.2%
South Asian	205	1.1%	120	0.7%	45	0.27%	45	0.29%	30	0.2%
African	105	0.56%	100	0.59%	30	0.18%	10	0.06%	35	0.23%
Middle Eastern (Note: Statistic includes total responses of "West Asian" and "Arab" under visible minority section on census.)	75	0.4%	35	0.21%	0	0%	30	0.19%	30	0.2%
Latin American	75	0.4%	25	0.15%	30	0.18%	20	0.13%	10	0.07%
Other/multiracial (Note: Statistic includes total responses of "Visible minority, n.i.e." and "Multiple visible minorities" under visible minority section on census.)	10	0.05%	10	0.06%	0	0%	0	0%	10	0.07%
Total responses	18,620	95.82%	17,030	96.18%	16,865	96.57%	15,555	97.15%	14,965	98.39%
Total population	19,432	100%	17,706	100%	17,464	100%	16,012	100%	15,210	100%
Note: Totals greater than 100% due to multiple origin responses.

=== Religion ===
According to the 2021 census, religious groups in Salmon Arm included:

- Irreligion (10,275 persons or 55.2%)
- Christianity (7,780 persons or 41.8%)
- Islam (115 persons or 0.6%)
- Sikhism (100 persons or 0.5%)
- Buddhism (70 persons or 0.4%)
- Judaism (15 persons or 0.1%)
- Other (245 persons or 1.3%)

== Economy ==
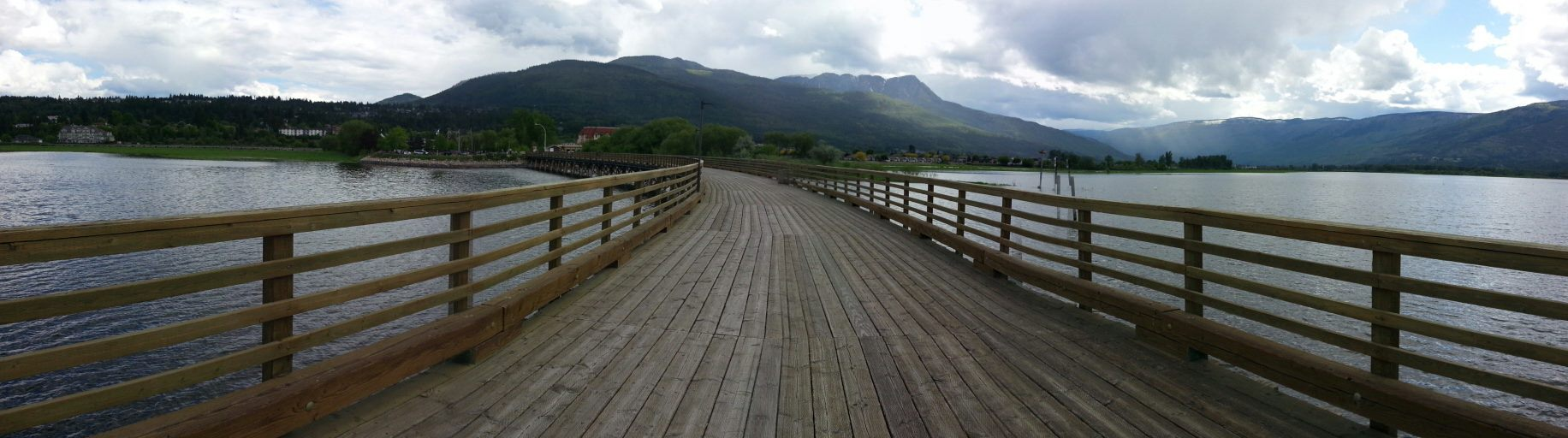
The wooden wharf in Salmon Arm, British Columbia, facing south (May 2013)

The largest employer in the Salmon Arm area is the forest industry and related businesses; however, due to economic conditions, the former Federated Co-Op sawmill has been out of operation since Dec. 21, 2007, although the co-located plywood production facility has generally remained operational. The plywood plant is owned by Gorman Bros. Lumber Ltd who purchased it from Federated Co-operatives Ltd. in 2012. The city benefits from access to the mainline of the Canadian Pacific Railway, which passes through the city.

Many tourists come to Salmon Arm from Vancouver, Calgary and Asia. Most tourists arrive during the summer season, either stopping en route to other holiday destinations or to visit Shuswap Lake, often via rental houseboats and which has recreation residential communities and campgrounds all around its shores. Salmon Arm has several hotels, campsites and houseboat rental outlets.

== Education ==
Public schools in Salmon Arm are part of School District 83 North Okanagan-Shuswap; within the city limits, there are currently five elementary schools (kindergarten to Grade 7), one middle school (Grades 6 to 8), and a secondary school with two campuses. Salmon Arm offers early French immersion, late French immersion and outdoor learning programs. Several elementary schools outside the city limits, including one combined elementary/middle school feed into the middle school and secondary school in Salmon Arm. Salmon Arm also offer a private Christian School (Kings Christian School). The current division of education grades between the different categories of schools began in 2007; prior to 2007, elementary schools within the city limits offered kindergarten to Grade 7, followed by two junior high schools with Grades 8 to 10, and a single senior secondary school with Grades 11 and 12. School District 83 also has its administrative offices (located in the town centre) and maintenance complex (located in the community's main industrial park) in Salmon Arm.

Salmon Arm is one of four Okanagan College campuses; it offers a range of academic and vocational programs.

Notable academics with ties to Salmon Arm include David Lethbridge and Mike Worobey. David Lethbridge is a retired Professor of Psychology and the author of Norman Bethune in Spain: Commitment, Crisis and Conspiracy. Mike Worobey is winner of the Nora and Ted Sterling Prize in Support of Controversy for 2009 from Simon Fraser University and is known for research on COVID-19 pandemic beginnings.

== Culture ==
The summer months are when the city experiences its largest fluctuation of population with people on holidays coming to visit the city and surrounding area. During every third weekend of August, the annual Salmon Arm Roots and Blues festival draws large crowds of festival-goers with an international roster of performers. The Festival emerged from the Shuswap Coffee House movement of the 1970s and 1980s, which by 1991 had coalesced into the non-profit Salmon Arm Folk Music Society, the Festival's founding body. From its grassroots beginnings, Roots & Blues has grown into the largest and most musically diverse festival in the British Columbian interior. After two years of virtual festival pre-recorded performances (2020 & 2021), the Festival resumes an in-person event for its 30th anniversary in 2022. There is also the annual Word on the Lake Writers' Festival organized by the Shuswap Association of Writers (SAW). For 17 years it was held at the Prestige Inn in Salmon Arm, though its 2022 venue will be located in Sorrento.

Salmon Arm is home to a multiplex movie theatre (Salmar Grand) and a single screen theatre for movies and live stage performances (Salmar Classic); both are owned and operated by a non-profit community organization, the Salmar Community Association. Additionally, a community theatre society hosts plays and other live stage performances (Shuswap Theatre) in a building across the street from the Salmar Grand multiplex.

The RJ Haney Heritage Park & Museum is Salmon Arm's main museum, and celebrates the history of the region. The museum often offers a dinner theatre program during the summer months, with the theatre component offering plays based on local history.

Salmon Arm is home to a branch of Okanagan Regional Library (ORL), which is currently located in Piccadilly Mall.

The Salmon Arm public art gallery is the Salmon Arm Art Gallery, housed in a historic building owned by the city and operated by Shuswap District Arts Council. The building was originally a post office, and later housed the Salmon Arm branch of Okanagan Regional Library for many years.

=== Sports and recreation ===
Large crowds of tourists and locals are drawn to the beaches at Sunnybrae, Canoe, and elsewhere on Shuswap Lake during the summer. The city has many large hotels, as well as berths for a number of houseboats.

The community offers a number of recreational facilities and sports leagues. There are fields for soccer/rugby/football, fields for baseball/softball, as well as a 6 sheet curling rink (SACC), five-pin bowling lanes (lakeside lanes bowling center), several golf courses and many seasonal recreational businesses. The proximity of the Shuswap Lake has also resulted in a growing interest in rowing and paddling sports, particularly dragon boat racing.

The Salmon Arm Silverbacks hockey team, in the BCHL, plays at Roger's Rink (formerly the Sunwave Centre). The publicly owned twin ice rink facility is named in relation to the facility's community sponsor, Shaw Cable (which purchased the local, independent cable service provider SunCountry Cablevision in June 2011; SunCountry had branded its highspeed cable Internet service as Sunwave.net, and had sponsored the ice rink facility under the name Sunwave Centre). Co-located in the same area with the Shaw Centre are the city's recreation centre (with pool, racquet courts, weight facility and auditorium/gymnasium), curling rink, lawn bowling facility, horseshoe pitch, and the Salmon Arm campus of Okanagan College. The city's previous indoor ice arena, Memorial Arena, has been repurposed as an indoor field sports facility, and is heavily used by such sports as soccer, rugby, and archery. Memorial Arena, with sponsorship from the Salmon Arm Savings & Credit Union has been rebranded as the SASCU Memorial Recreation Centre, while the main recreation centre is similarly sponsored and branded the SASCU Recreation Centre.

Former NHL player Dave Scatchard was raised in Salmon Arm, playing his minor hockey there. Other notable athletes raised in or with ties to Salmon Arm are swimmer Rick Say and curler Sandra Jenkins.

== Transportation ==
Salmon Arm lies on the Trans-Canada Highway approximately halfway between Vancouver and Calgary. It is also at the top of Highway 97B, which leads to Vernon and Kelowna. The economy benefits from through traffic; many brand-name hotels and restaurants have opened in the past few decades.

The Canadian Pacific Kansas City also runs through Salmon Arm. No passenger service is available, though the Rocky Mountaineer trains pass through on occasion despite not stopping.

Salmon Arm Airport mainly serves general aviation aircraft, though scheduled service to Vancouver and Calgary was available by Northern Hawk Aviation until it ceased operations.

Salmon Arm has a bus network that serves neighbourhoods and shopping destinations using commuter minibuses on hourly schedules. It also offers handyDart service for the disabled and scheduled services to communities across the region once per week.

== Sister city ==
- Salmon Arm's sister city is Inashiki, Ibaraki, Japan (Formerly Azuma, Ibaraki, Japan, until its recent amalgamation into Inashiki). There is a pavilion near McGuire Lake in honour of the friendship between Japan and Salmon Arm.

== Notable people ==
- Gail Anderson-Dargatz – author
- Calvin Ayre – entrepreneur
- Dan Bremnes – Christian musician, resident of Salmon Arm
- Brian Drummond – voice actor
- Cody Franson – NHL player, defenceman for the Nashville Predators
- E.V. Gordon – medieval philologist and colleague of J.R.R. Tolkien, was born in Salmon Arm in 1896
- Curtis Lazar – NHL player, captain of Team Canada at the World Junior 2015
- Justin Maas – visual artist & author
- Jesse Mast – country music singer-songwriter
- Rick Say – 3-time Olympic and national record holding swimmer
- Dave Scatchard – former NHL player
- Greg Sczebel – two-time Juno Award-winning independent singer/songwriter
- Bev Smith – basketball player and coach
- Richard Underhill – jazz saxophonist and Juno Award winner
- Natalie Wilkie – Paralympic champion, cross-country skiing
- Michael Worobey – evolutionary biologist and professor at the University of Arizona

== In popular culture ==
- The Punch-Out!! character Bear Hugger resides in Salmon Arm. Additionally, he even has an attack of the same name.
