= Grindrod, British Columbia =

Unincorporated place in British Columbia, Canada

Grindrod
- Community
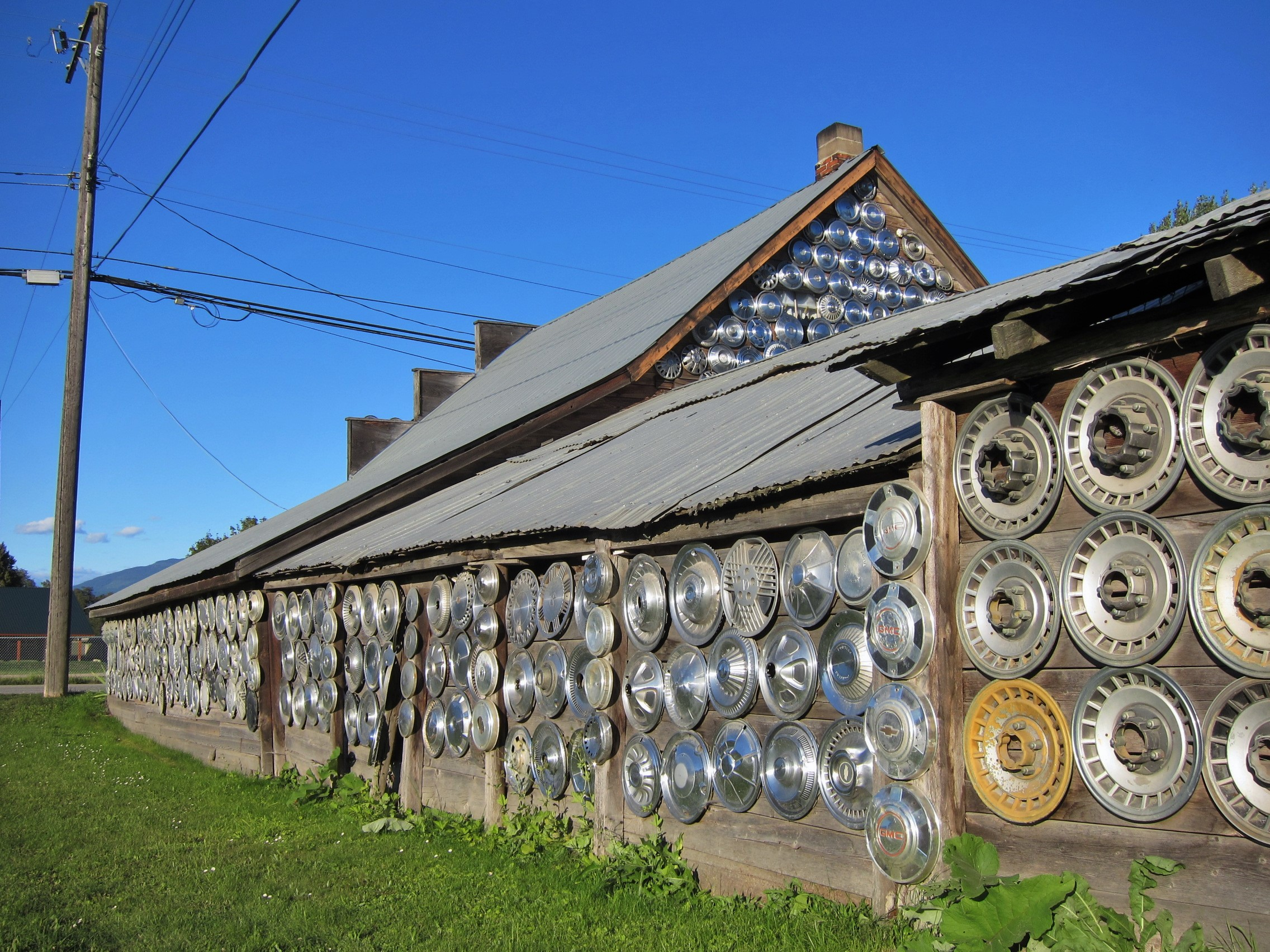
- Gordon's New & Used, Grindrod, 2014.

- Location of Grindrod in British Columbia
- Coordinates: 50°37′59″N 119°07′04″W
- Country: Canada
- Province: British Columbia
- Region: Okanagan; Shuswap
- Regional district: North Okanagan

Area
  - Total: 43.2 km^{2} (16.7 sq mi)

Population (2021)
  - Total: 1,526
  - Density: 35.3/km^{2} (91.5/sq mi)
- Time zone: UTC−07:00 (PT)
- Postal code: V0E 1Y0
- Area codes: 250, 778, 236, & 672
- Highways: Highway 97A
- Waterways: Shuswap River

Grindrod is an unincorporated community in south central British Columbia, Canada. Concentrated on the western shore of the Shuswap River, the place borders the Shuswap and Okanagan regions. On BC Highway 97A, the locality is by road about 46 kilometres (29 mi) southwest of Sicamous, 19 kilometres (12 mi) southeast of Salmon Arm, and 51 kilometres (32 mi) north of Vernon.

== Name origin ==
In the mid-1880s, the immediate locality was called Seven Mile.

The Canadian Pacific Railway (CP) named the new station after Edmund Holden Grindrod, the first CP telegraph inspector in British Columbia (1886–1910). Formerly, the place was considered part of the general area of North Enderby.

== Early pioneers ==
In 1889, George Weir pre-empted just south of where the highway passes between the river and rock bluff, whereas John Lambert settled about 2.4 kilometres (1.5 mi) farther south. The Lambert property lay between the later golf course and Monk Rd. To drain his land, he dug ditches between the ponds, ultimately creating Lambert Creek. He was the local Justice of the peace and introduced the first horse-drawn hay baler to the district.

Prior to the railway construction in 1891, the Red Star II replaced the stage in carrying freight and mail upstream during the summer months.

In 1893, William Monk homesteaded 1.6 kilometres (1 mi) east of the present bridge. A successful farmer, he was a director of the Enderby Farmer's Exchange in 1905. He was also a provincial road foreman for many years. In 1906, his brother John settled with his family and initially worked with William. In 1911, John skidded his house to the west side of the river, operating the first post office from an addition to the residence.

== Railway ==
In May 1891, the southward advance of the Shuswap and Okanagan Railway (S&O) rail head from Sicamous passed through Enderby.

Opening in 1908, the station was at the northwest end of Carlin St.

In 1911, a freight shed was erected.

In 1919, the station burned to the ground but was replaced the next year. Although the two-room structure had the first phone in the area, the waiting room was small, unlit, and warmed only by an old stove.

In 1921, a freight car derailed. The next month, when a southbound freight train struck a truck on the railway crossing, a passenger died in hospital, but the driver was not seriously injured.

In 1947, a train struck a vehicle at a crossing, killing the driver and injuring two passengers.

In 1964, the Grindrod passing track capacity was 61 cars.

In 1965, CP sold the station building for removal.

In 1968, 12 cars of a southbound freight train derailed, tearing up 91 metres (300 ft) of track. The two tanker cars that overturned spilled fuel over the highway and surroundings.

CP Train Timetables (Regular stop or Flag stop)
	Mile	1905	1909	1912	1916	1919	c.1922	1929	1932	1935	1939	1943	1948	1954	1959
Sicamous	0.0	Regular	Regular	Regular	Regular	Regular	Regular	Regular	Regular	Regular	Regular	Regular	Regular	Regular	Regular
Mara	12.6	Regular	Regular	Regular	Regular	Regular	Regular	Regular	Regular	Regular	Regular	Regular	Regular	Regular	Flag
Grindrod	17.3		Regular	Regular	Regular	Regular	Regular	Regular	Regular	Regular	Regular	Regular	Regular	Regular	Flag
Enderby	23.0	Regular	Regular	Regular	Regular	Regular	Regular	Regular	Regular	Regular	Regular	Regular	Regular	Regular	Flag
Stepney	26.8							Flag	Flag	Flag	Flag	Flag	Flag	Flag	
Armstrong	31.8	Regular	Regular	Regular	Regular	Regular	Regular	Regular	Regular	Regular	Regular	Regular	Regular	Regular	Regular

^a. In 1960, CP cancelled the route, leaving only the Salmon Arm–Kelowna service on Greyhound Canada.
^b. In 2023, work began on the first 2 kilometres (1.2 mi) of the 50-kilometre (31 mi) Sicamous-Armstrong rail trail to be called the Shuswap North Okanagan Rail Trail.

== Roads and bridges ==
In 1884, the first 8 kilometres (5 mi) of a Belvidere–Mara Lake wagon road was built. The next year, the road passed through the Grindrod area and was completed.

Although planned, it is unclear whether a formal ferry was ever installed.

The locals built the first bridge, a small log structure, which opened in 1910. The replacement in 1923 was a 30-metre (100 ft) Howe truss.

In 1957, the Grindrod–Sicamous road was paved.

Barker Construction Co was awarded the present bridge contract ($227,973). The two-lane concrete and steel structure opened in 1958.

== Earlier community ==
In early 1909, the Carlins surveyed their 570-hectare (1,400-acre) property for a subdivision, and lot sales began that April. Weeks later, a fire swept through the area causing great loss before advancing to Mara. The fire appears to have hampered sales. In 1910, the whole subdivision, known as the Carlin Estate was bought by the Vancouver Colonization Co. This holding, which was described as being around 610 hectares (1,500 acres) stretching from about 0.8 kilometres (0.5 mi) south of the train station to 3.7 kilometres (2.3 mi) north, had been subdivided into 4-and-8-hectare (10-and-20-acre) farms.

John Monk was the inaugural postmaster 1911–1929.

In 1913, the North Coast Land Co, developer of the Carlin land, began clearing adjacent to the train station. By May 1914, the area between the station and the river was clear of trees. In 1915, Harry Tomkinson opened a general store. In 1918, the community hall was completed.

St Paul's Anglican church building was opened in 1920. That year, the land was acquired for Grindrod Park, Arthur Tomkinson opened a garage and radio sales/repair shop, and Harry Tomkinson sold his store to McAusland & Spence. The new storekeeper mistook a sack of potassium cyanide for common salt when filling a customer order, which led to the death of 43 cattle. The store was successfully sued. Subsequently, Harry bought back the store, later selling it to Arthur.

The Grindrod Motor Garage thrived in handling repairs, and selling parts and vehicles. The premises were enlarged in 1921 to hold 16 cars.

In 1922, John Monk opened the J. Monk & Sons store, which housed the post office and remained a family business for 45 years. In 1934, a barbershop was the third store erected.

During World War II, Grindrod Park was leased out as pasture land. Baseball and hockey were popular over the following years. In the 1970s, the park was donated to the regional district.

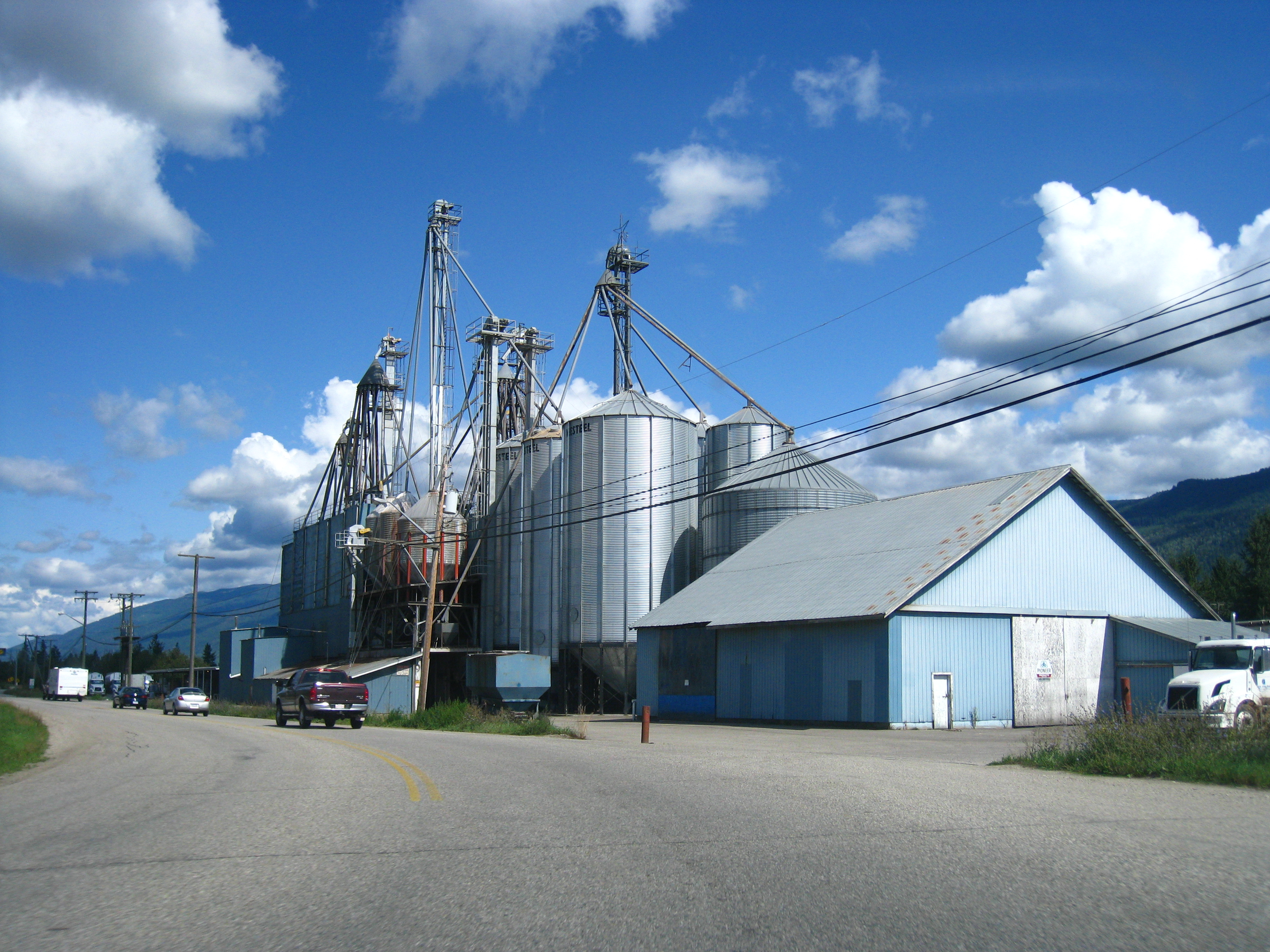
Livestock feed plant, Sure-Crop Feeds, Grindrod, 2008.

In 1946, the Grindrod Credit Union was established, which the Enderby Credit Union took over in 1980.

In 1952, fire destroyed the original store and garage.

In 1957, Sure-Crop Feeds, the area's largest employer, was founded.

In 1968, fire destroyed the community hall. Around this time, retail enterprises comprised two stores, a post office, a credit union, and a TV and radio repair shop.

In 1971, Birchdale Golf Course opened as a simple chip-and-putt, later to develop into a popular venue for tournaments.

By the early 1990s, the TV and radio shop had closed.

== Schools ==
In 1905–06, the school that opened at North Enderby was 1.6 kilometres (1 mi) to the south. In 1911, Grindrod school was founded and North Enderby closed.

Volunteers built the one-room log schoolhouse, which was replaced in 1913. The old log building became a meeting house or occasional teacherage. The new two-storey frame structure comprised a large classroom upstairs and a furnace/storage area on the lower level. In the 1920s, two large classrooms were added to the south side. A fire in 1942 destroyed the building. The two-storey replacement comprised two upstairs classrooms. In fall 1969, a modern school building opened.

In 1984, the former buildings were demolished.

The elementary school is part of School District 83 North Okanagan-Shuswap. The K–7 student population totals about 120.

== Ukrainians ==
In the early 1920s, large numbers of Ukrainians began arriving from Manitoba. In 1922, land was bought or donated for a Ukrainian cemetery and church. In 1923, the local school board insisted that the Ukrainians build their own school, because of the burden created by the children possessing limited English. However, such discrimination was quickly realized and the board reversed the decision.

In 1924, the Ukrainian church building opened for services. During the mid-1920s to mid-1930s, the Ukrainian community grew but then gradually diminished as people moved away. In 1970, church services ceased. In 1977, rumours circulated that the church would be demolished. From 1978, services resumed but were only held quarterly at first.

In 1999, the church burned down.

The rebuilt Church of Sts. Peter and Paul (Ukrainian) and the cemetery remain in use.

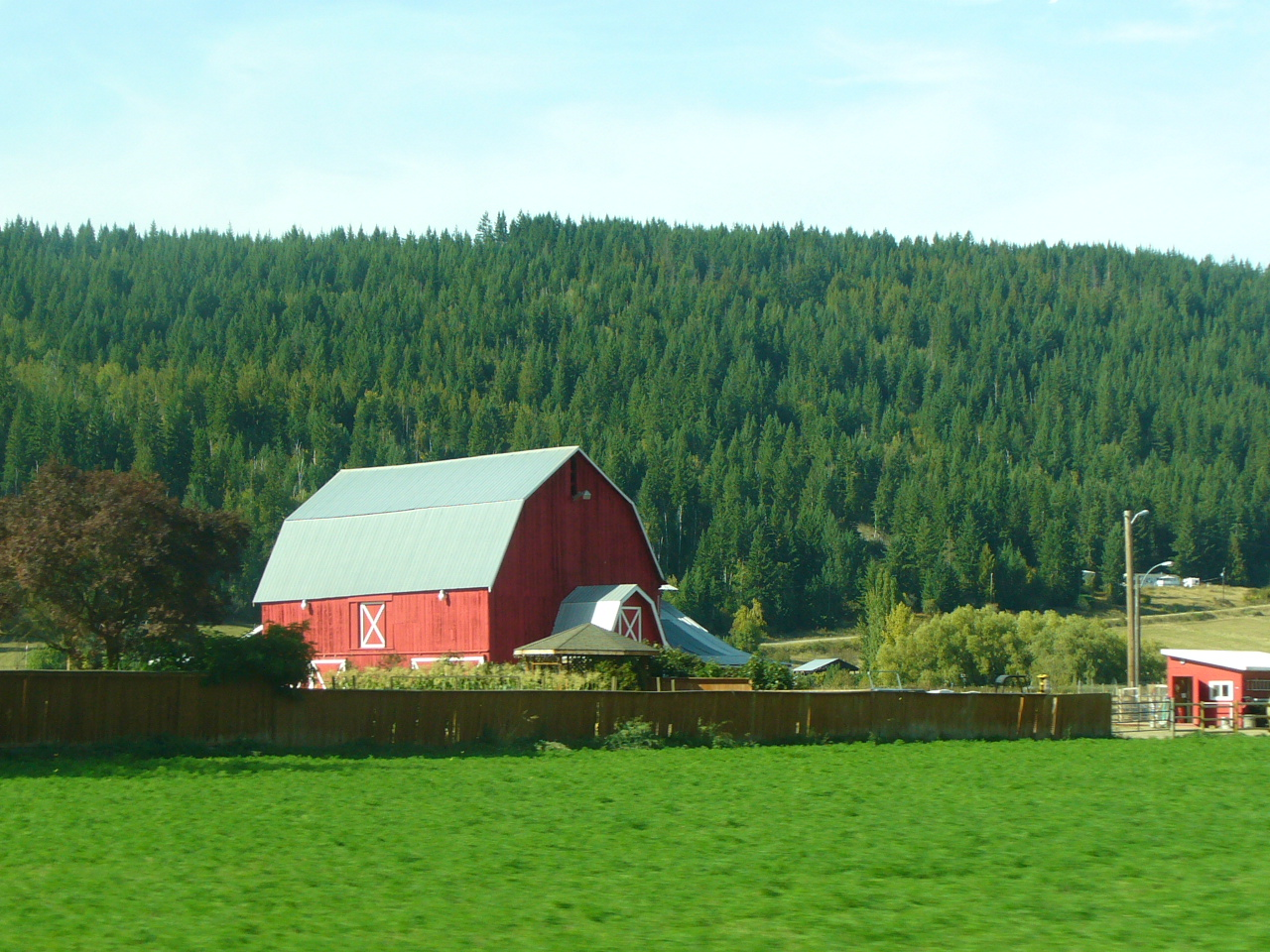
A barn, Grindrod, 2011.

== Agriculture ==
Grindrod was the centre of the Carlin Orchard country. The soil is fine silt of very great depth, which in the 1910s was noted as suited to fruit growing, mixed farming, and poultry.

Nowadays, the green pastures and alfalfa crops sustain the predominance of dairy farming. Farmer John de Dood offers tours of his automatic milking system. The adjacent Farmer John's Market sells local dairy and organic products. On scattered farms, corn grows seasonally. More recent diversity includes organic vegetables, blueberries, and grapes.

== Forestry ==
On buying a steam-powered sawmill plant in 1913, Arthur Tomkinson established the Grindrod sawmill. In 1916, he partnered with Henry William Bischel in the lumber and pole business on the east side of the river.

In 1918, Tomkinson sold his interest in the mill to his partner, while purchasing machinery to build a new sawmill. Completed that year, the mill was set up on the west side of the river. Meanwhile, the Bischel sawmill went into liquidation.

In 1921, the Grindrod mill closed indefinitely.

Over the following decades, various lumber mills have existed. Established around 1990, Paragon Wood Products had its own spur.

== Notable people ==
Census population: Grindrod
Year	Pop.	±%
1951	374	—
1956	203	−45.7%
1961	340	+67.5%
1966	298	−12.4%
1971	283	−5.0%
1976	119	−58.0%
1981		—
1986	107	—
1991	421	+293.5%
1996		—
2001		—
2006	1,497	—
2011	1,453	−2.9%
2016	1,470	+1.2%
2021	1,526	+3.8%
Source: Statistics Canada

- Janet Cardiff, (1957– ), sound artist, resident.
- Eileen Kernaghan, (1939– ), author, resident.
- George Bures Miller, (1960– ), sound artist, resident.

== Later community ==
The Grindrod Water Utility is managed by the regional district. Sure-Crop Feeds has an industrial connection. The school, Gospel Church, Ukrainian Catholic Church, and credit union have institutional connections. The Riverfront Pub, Gordon's New and Used, Mayberry Store, and Leather and Stitches have commercial connections. About 50 residential connections exist.

The post office is in the Leather and Stitches building. The Gospel Church has acquired the former Anglican building.

In 2000, fire damaged the general store.

In 2001, the Runaway Moon Theatre was founded.

In 2002, the Mayberry Country Market was established.

In 2006, the annual Grindrod Days was first held.

In 2008, the original Riverfront Pub building burned to the ground.

In 2009, the annual Grindrod Garlic Festival began.

In 2012, the river flooding affected access to the Grindrod Pump Station (GRPS).

In 2013, the new community hall opened.

In 2023, shots were fired into the Riverfront Pub.

== Filming location ==
Scenes from the following were shot in the area:

- Tomorrowland (2015).

== Maps ==
- "Rand McNally BC map". www.davidrumsey.com. 1925.
- "Standard Oil BC map". www.davidrumsey.com. 1937.
