= Spallumcheen (disambiguation) =

Spallumcheen is a municipality in British Columbia. Spallumcheen may also refer to:

- Spallumcheen Indian Band government, a.k.a. the Splats'in First Nations, and/or one of its reserves
- Spallumcheen Valley, a name used for the area around and including Spallumcheen, Enderby and Armstrong in British Columbia
- Madeline Lake, a lake in the Spallumcheen Valley formerly known as Spallumcheen Lake
- Shuswap River, a river formerly known as Spallumcheen River

== See also ==
- Spillimacheen
