= Suffixed routes of British Columbia Highway 97 =

Highway system in British Columbia, Canada

Suffixed routes of British Columbia Highway 97
- Highways 97A & 97C highlighted in red and Highways 97B & 97D highlighted in blue

Route information
- Maintained by the Ministry of Transportation and Infrastructure

Location
- Country: Canada
- Province: British Columbia

Highway system
- British Columbia provincial highways
| ← Highway 97 | → Highway 99 |

There are four current and two former suffixed routes of Highway 97 in British Columbia, Canada. The majority of the routes serve the Okanagan area of the British Columbia Interior.

== Highway 97A ==
- Highway 97A
- Length: 65 km (40 mi)
- South end: Highway 97 near Vernon
- Major junctions: Highway 97B near Grindrod
- North end: Highway 1 (TCH) in Sicamous

Highway 97A is a 65 km (40 mi) spur route between Highway 97 near Vernon and Highway 1 in Sicamous. Other communities on Highway 97A include Spallumcheen, Armstrong, and Enderby. The highway is designated as a core route of Canada's National Highway System for its entire length.

Highway 97A's current alignment is not the same as its original route. Originally, when the '97A' designation was first given to the highway in 1953, replacing the Highway 5 designation, it went from a junction with Highway 97 at Swan Lake, where it starts today, northeast to Grindrod, and then it followed the modern-day Highway 97B to Salmon Arm, then following the Trans-Canada Highway west to Monte Creek, where Highway 97 merges onto the Highway 1. Between 1957 and 1962, Highway 97A had the designation of '97E'. Finally, in 1962, Highway 97A was re-routed onto its present alignment, going north from Swan Lake to Grindrod, and then northeast to Sicamous.

=== Former alignments ===
There are former alignments of Highway 97A outside of the north Okanagan.

Prince George

Two former alignments of Highway 97A are within Prince George, connecting the main Highway 97 with the Yellowhead Highway (Highway 16). A 10 km (6 mi) segment next to the Prince George Airport, which now carries the name Old Cariboo Highway; while a 3 km (2 mi) segment was in downtown Prince George, following 1st Avenue west of Victoria Avenue to the Cameron Street Bridge, connecting with Highway 97 north of the Nechako River. Both are part of the original Highway 97 through Prince George and the designations were dropped in c. 2000.

Penticton

Highway 97 originally followed Skaha Lake Road, Main Street, and Westminster Avenue through downtown Penticton. In the early 1980s, a bypass was constructed along the Channel Parkway and initially designated as Highway 97A. Shortly afterwards, Highway 97 was moved to the new bypass while city/business route was removed from the provincial highway system.

=== Major intersections ===
| Regional District | Location | km | mi | Destinations | Notes |
|---|---|---|---|---|---|
| North Okanagan | Spallumcheen | 0.00 | 0.00 | Highway 97 – Kamloops, Vernon, Kelowna | Swan Lake Interchange; Highway 97A southern terminus; through traffic follows Highway 97 south |
| North Okanagan | Spallumcheen | 4.87 | 3.03 | Larkin Cross Road, Otter Lake Cross Road | Interchange |
| North Okanagan | Armstrong | 13.25 | 8.23 | Smith Road | Seagull intersection |
| North Okanagan | Enderby | 26.38 | 16.39 | Granville Avenue, Hubert Avenue – Mabel Lake | |
| North Okanagan | | 32.52 | 20.21 | Highway 97B north – Salmon Arm | |
| Columbia-Shuswap | Sicamous | 65.49 | 40.69 | Highway 1 (TCH) – Kamloops, Salmon Arm, Revelstoke, Calgary | Highway 97A northern terminus |
1.000 mi = 1.609 km; 1.000 km = 0.621 mi

== Highway 97B ==
- Highway 97B
- Length: 14 km (8.7 mi)
- South end: Highway 97A near Grindrod
- North end: Highway 1 (TCH) in Salmon Arm

Highway 97B is 14 km (8.7 mi) spur off Highway 97A, from Grindrod to Salmon Arm. The highway is designated as a core route of Canada's National Highway System for its entire length.

Highway 97B was originally part of Highway 5 until 1953 when it was renumbered to Highway 97A. In 1957, the highway became Highway 97E, but was again renumbered in 1962 to its current designation when Highway 97E (now Highway 97A) was re-aligned to southwest of Sicamous.

=== Major intersections ===
| Regional District | Location | km | mi | Destinations | Notes |
|---|---|---|---|---|---|
| North Okanagan | | 0.00 | 0.00 | Highway 97A – Sicamous, Enderby, Vernon | |
| Columbia-Shuswap | Salmon Arm | 14.43 | 8.97 | Highway 1 (TCH) – Kamloops, Revelstoke, Calgary | At grade, traffic signals |
1.000 mi = 1.609 km; 1.000 km = 0.621 mi

== Highway 97C ==
- Highway 97C
- Length: 224 km (139 mi)
- East end: Highway 97 north of Peachland
- Highway junction: Highway 5 / Highway 5A in Merritt
- North end: Highway 1 (TCH) / Highway 97 in Cache Creek

Highway 97C is 224 km (139 mi) highway divided into east–west and north–south segments. The east–west segment has expressway and freeway sections, forms part of an important link between the Lower Mainland and the Okanagan Valley south of Kelowna, and is known as Okanagan Connector or Coquihalla Connector. It bisects the Highway 5 (Coquihalla Highway) at Merritt. North of Merritt, it becomes a secondary, two-lane highway and terminates at the Highway 1 / Highway 97 junction in Cache Creek.

== Highway 97D ==
- Highway 97D
- Length: 28 km (17 mi)
- West end: Highway 97C at Logan Lake
- Highway junction: Highway 5 near Lac le Jeune
- East end: Lac le Jeune Road at Lac le Jeune

Highway 97D, previously known as Meadow Creek Road, is a 28 km (17 mi) highway linking Highway 97C in Logan Lake to the Coquihalla Highway near Lac le Jeune. Highway 97D is a new route, receiving its designation in 2005; it allows more direct access between Logan Lake and Kamloops without travelling through Merritt. Officially, Highway 97D continues east for 4 km (2 mi) from the Coquihalla Highway to Lac le Jeune Road; however, the section is unsigned.

=== Major intersections ===
The entire route is in Thompson-Nicola Regional District.

| Location | km | mi | Destinations | Notes |
|---|---|---|---|---|
| Logan Lake | 0.00 | 0.00 | Highway 97C / Tunkwa Lake Road – Ashcroft, Merritt | Highway 97D western terminus |
| | 24.33 | 15.12 | Highway 5 (YH) (Coquihalla Highway) – Kamloops, Merritt, Vancouver | Walloper Interchange; Highway 5 exit 336; Highway 97D becomes unsigned |
| Lac le Jeune | 27.90 | 17.34 | Lac le Jeune Road (Highway 906:0923 north) | Highway 97D eastern terminus |
1.000 mi = 1.609 km; 1.000 km = 0.621 mi

== Highway 97E ==
- Highway 97E
- Length: 132 km (82 mi)
- Existed: 1957–1962
- South end: Highway 97 / Highway 97W near Vernon
- Major junctions: Highway 1 (TCH) in Salmon Arm
- North end: Highway 1 (TCH) / Highway 97 / Highway 97W at Monte Creek

Highway 97E was a 132 km (82 mi) former highway between the Vernon and Monte Creek, which along with Highway 97W, made up a split of Highway 97. Highway 97E was designated in 1957 and replaced the original Highway 97A between Vernon and Salmon Arm. It went from the Highway 97/97W junction at Swan Lake, just north of Vernon, 47 km (29 mi) north to Salmon Arm where it continued west for 85 km (53 mi) to Monte Creek, cosigned with Highway 1, where it rejoined Highway 97/97W. In 1962, Highway 97E was renumbered to its current designations of Highway 97A and Highway 97B.

== Highway 97W ==
- Highway 97W
- Length: 79 km (49 mi)
- Existed: 1957–1962
- South end: Highway 97 / Highway 97E near Vernon
- North end: Highway 1 (TCH) / Highway 97 / Highway 97E at Monte Creek

Highway 97W was a 79 km (49 mi) former highway between the Vernon and Monte Creek, which along with Highway 97E, made up a split of Highway 97. Highway 97W was designated in 1957 when Highway 97 was renumbered between Swan Lake and Monte Creek. In 1962, Highway 97W was reverted to its current Highway 97 designation.
