= Spallumcheen =

- District municipality
- The Corporation of the Township of Spallumcheen
- Location of Spallumcheen in British Columbia
- Coordinates: 50°26′N 119°13′W
- Country: Canada
- Province: British Columbia
- Regional district: North Okanagan
- Incorporated: 1892

Area
  - Total: 255.77 km^{2} (98.75 sq mi)

Population (2011)
  - Total: 5,055
  - Density: 19.76/km^{2} (51.19/sq mi)
- Time zone: UTC−07:00 (PT)
- Website: www.spallumcheentwp.bc.ca

Historical population
Year	Pop.	±%
1921	523	—
1931	1,629	+211.5%
1941	1,805	+10.8%
1951	1,936	+7.3%
1956	1,937	+0.1%
1961	2,123	+9.6%
1966	2,076	−2.2%
1971	2,302	+10.9%
1976	3,378	+46.7%
1981	4,213	+24.7%
1986	4,310	+2.3%
1991	4,719	+9.5%
1996	5,322	+12.8%
2001	5,134	−3.5%
2006	4,960	−3.4%
2011	5,055	+1.9%
Sources: Statistics Canada

Spallumcheen is a district municipality in the Canadian province of British Columbia. Located in the Okanagan region between Vernon and Enderby, the township had a population of 5,055 and land area of 255.77 square kilometres (98.75 sq mi) in the Canada 2011 Census. The district, whose official name is the Township of Spallumcheen and which is the oldest rural municipality in the British Columbia Interior (incorporated in 1892), consists primarily of agricultural land surrounding the separately incorporated City of Armstrong. Both Spallumcheen and Armstrong are member municipalities of the Regional District of North Okanagan.

== Etymology ==
The name is derived from a Shuswap language word, either "spil-a-mi-shine" meaning "flat mouth", or "spal-lum-shin" meaning "meadow flat". Another word, spalmtsin, which has an Okanagan language cognate spelemtsin, means "flat area along edge". Other variations include Spellmacheen and Spallamcheen, which were the original names used for the Shuswap River, which exits the Shuswap Highland in this area and heads north to Mara and Shuswap Lakes. The same word is the source of the name of the Spillimacheen River and the settlement of the same name in the Columbia Valley.

== Demographics ==
In the 2021 Census of Population conducted by Statistics Canada, Spallumcheen had a population of 5,307 living in 2,036 of its 2,099 total private dwellings, a change of 3.9% from its 2016 population of 5,106. With a land area of 254.92 km^{2} (98.43 sq mi), it had a population density of 20.8/km^{2} (53.9/sq mi) in 2021.

=== Ethnicity ===
Panethnic groups in the District of Spallumcheen (2001−2021)
Panethnic group	2021		2016		2011		2006		2001	
Panethnic group	Pop.	%	Pop.	%	Pop.	%	Pop.	%	Pop.	%
European (Note: Statistic includes all persons that did not make up part of a visible minority or an indigenous identity.)	4,915	92.65%	4,720	92.55%	4,690	92.96%	4,690	94.56%	4,790	93.37%
Indigenous	310	5.84%	275	5.39%	320	6.34%	220	4.44%	240	4.68%
East Asian (Note: Statistic includes total responses of "Chinese", "Korean", and "Japanese" under visible minority section on census.)	30	0.57%	40	0.78%	40	0.79%	20	0.4%	50	0.97%
Southeast Asian (Note: Statistic includes total responses of "Filipino" and "Southeast Asian" under visible minority section on census.)	20	0.38%	35	0.69%	0	0%	10	0.2%	15	0.29%
African	15	0.28%	0	0%	0	0%	0	0%	0	0%
South Asian	0	0%	0	0%	0	0%	30	0.6%	10	0.19%
Latin American	0	0%	10	0.2%	0	0%	0	0%	20	0.39%
Middle Eastern (Note: Statistic includes total responses of "West Asian" and "Arab" under visible minority section on census.)	0	0%	0	0%	0	0%	0	0%	0	0%
Other/multiracial (Note: Statistic includes total responses of "Visible minority, n.i.e." and "Multiple visible minorities" under visible minority section on census.)	0	0%	20	0.39%	0	0%	10	0.2%	10	0.19%
Total responses	5,305	99.96%	5,100	99.88%	5,045	100.1%	4,960	100%	5,130	99.92%
Total population	5,307	100%	5,106	100%	5,040	100%	4,960	100%	5,134	100%
Note: Totals greater than 100% due to multiple origin responses.

=== Religion ===
According to the 2021 census, religious groups in Spallumcheen included:

- Irreligion (2,925 persons or 55.1%)
- Christianity (2,315 persons or 43.6%)
  - Catholic (345 persons or 6.5%)
  - United Church (215 persons or 4.1%)
  - Baptist (135 persons or 2.5%)
  - Reformed (110 persons or 2.1%)
  - Anabaptist (65 persons or 1.2%)
  - Lutheran (65 persons or 1.2%)
  - Other Christian (1,380 persons or 26.0%)
- Other (50 persons or 0.9%)

== See also ==
- Spallumcheen Indian Band
