= Mara Provincial Park =

Provincial park in British Columbia, Canada

- IUCN category II (national park)
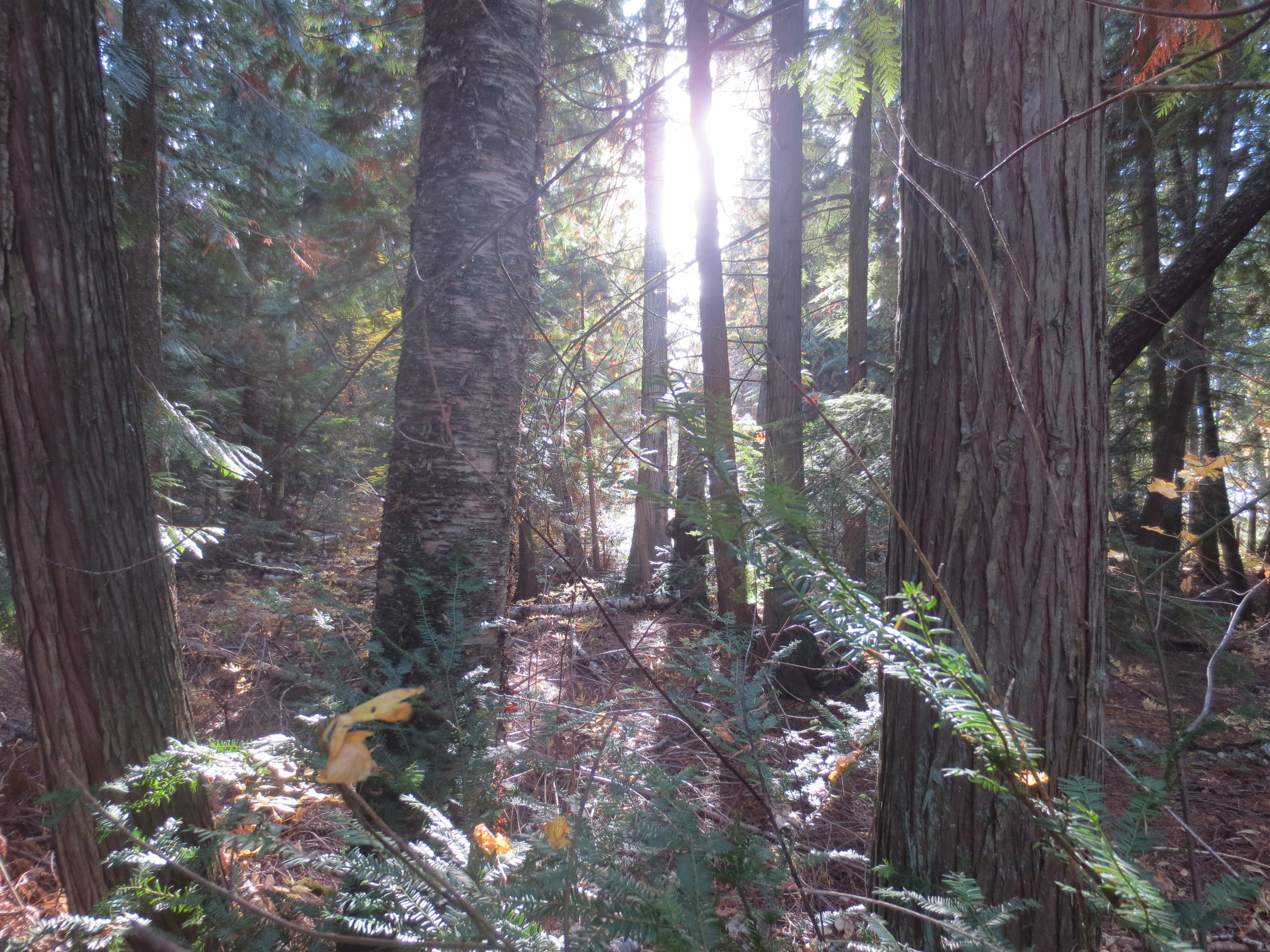
- Sunlight filters through autumn forest at Mara Provincial Park

- Location within British Columbia
- Interactive map of Mara Provincial Park
- Location: Canada
- Coordinates: 50°43′23″N 119°02′04″W
- Area: 5 ha (12 acres)
- Established: 1958
- Operator: BC Parks
- Website: bcparks.ca/mara-park/

Mara Provincial Park is a day-use provincial park in British Columbia, Canada, located on Mara Lake south of Sicamous. The park is open with services from May 1 to September 27, and the gate is locked open during the off season.

Mara Provincial Park is dedicated to intensive recreation, providing opportunities for public recreation access and use of Mara Lake, with emphasis on swimming, picnicking and boat launching. Mara Provincial Park provides good sandy beaches and the only major public access and boat launch on Mara Lake.

There is fish-spawning at the mouths of two creeks. One kekuli pit can be found in the park, but this feature is only considered as locally significant.

== Gallery ==
Autumn in Mara Provincial Park, overlooking the lake, geese flight calls from overhead

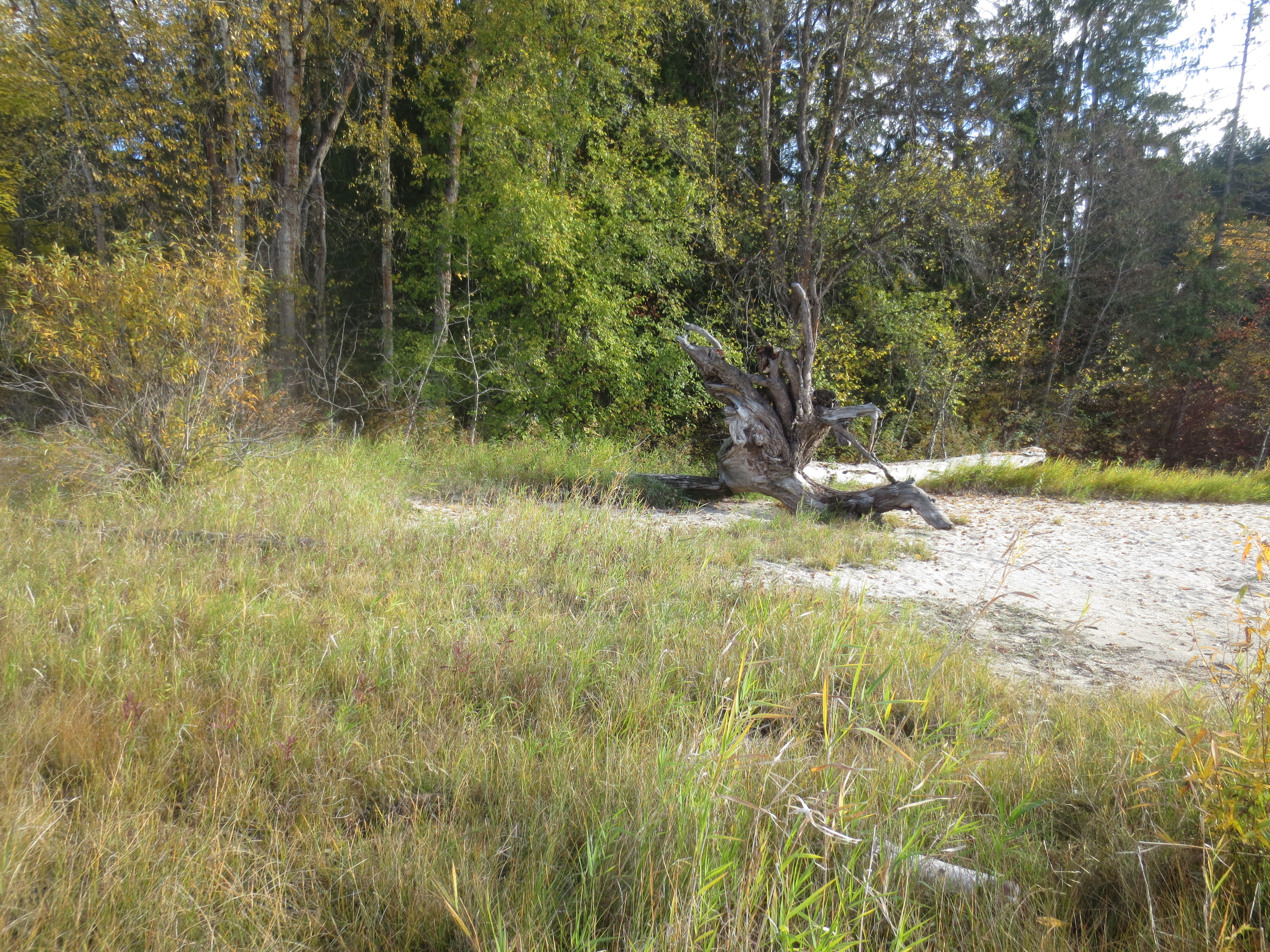
Beach in autumn at mara provincial park

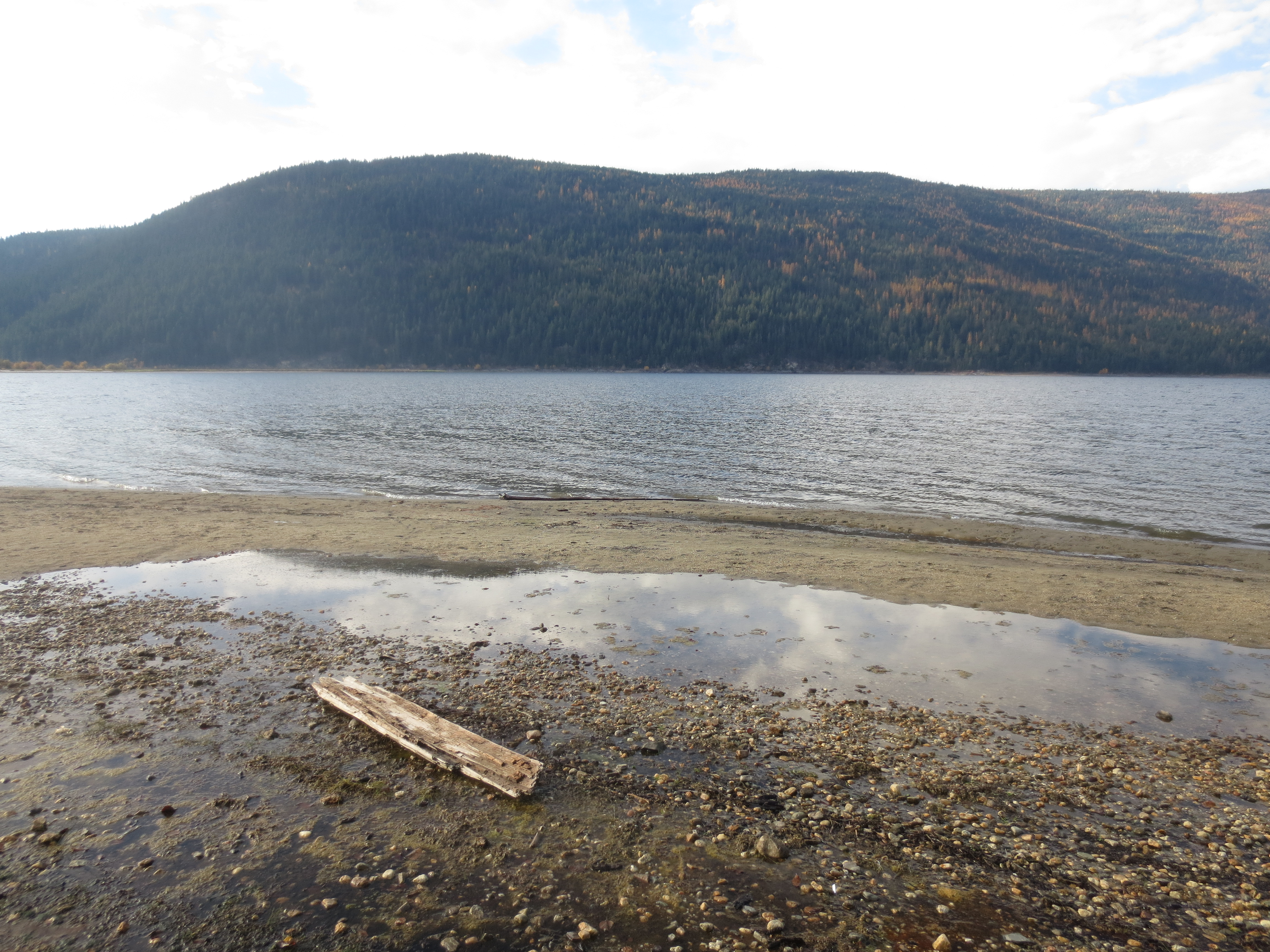
Mara lake from the beach at mara provincial park

== See also ==
- Shuswap Lake Marine Provincial Park (Mara Point Site)
- List of protected areas of British Columbia
