= Shuswap Lake Marine Provincial Park =

Provincial park in British Columbia, Canada

- IUCN category II (national park)
- Location within British Columbia
- Interactive map of Shuswap Lake Marine Provincial Park
- Location: British Columbia, Canada
- Nearest city: Sicamous
- Coordinates: 51°01′19″N 119°01′44″W
- Area: 8.94 km^{2} (3.45 sq mi)
- Established: May 9, 1980
- Governing body: BC Parks

Shuswap Lake Marine Provincial Park is a provincial park in British Columbia, Canada, comprising 894 ha. The Park has a variety of amenities including boat launch ramps, picnic areas, and 27 campsites around the perimeter of Shuswap Lake. The lake's name and that of the surrounding Shuswap Country is from the Shuswap people (Secwepemc), the most northern of the Salishan speaking people.

Activities in the Park include all types of water sports, hiking, and fishing.

== List of sites ==
- Albas Site; 120 ha. NW shore Seymour Arm, 51°12′15″N 119°00′20″W
- Aline Hill Site; 20 ha. S of Cennemousun Narrows, 50°56′25″N 119°20′20″W
- Anstey Beach Site; 4.5 ha. head of Anstey Arm, 51°07′50″N 118°54′00″W
- Anstey Arm West Site; 50 ha. W shore Anstey Arm, 51°06′25″N 118°54′40″W
- Anstey View Site; 12.5 ha. W shore Anstey Arm, 51°02′05″N 118°59′10″W
- Beach Bay Site; 35.9 ha. E side Seymour Arm, 51°10′00″N 118°59′55″W
- Cottonwood Beach Site; 12 ha. E shore Seymour Arm, 51°05′30″N 119°01′10″W
- Encounter Point Site; 41 ha. W shore Seymour Arm, 51°07′35″N 119°01′30″W
- Four Mile Creek Site; 90 ha. E shore Anstey Arm, 51°04′55″N 118°53′35″W
- Fowler Point Site; 21.4 ha. W shore Seymour Arm, near head, 51°13′30″N 118°58′45″W
- Hermit Bay Site; 78 ha. E side Salmon Arm (peninsula), 50°53′40″N 119°05′00″W
- Horseshoe Bay Site;11.36 ha. N shore Shuswap Lake, 50°58′30″N 119°07′00″W
- Hungry Cove Site; 86.2 ha. N of Sicamous Narrows, 50°52′40″N 119°02′30″W
- Marble Point Site; 174.9 ha. N of Sicamous Narrows, 50°55′05″N 119°01′40″W
- Neilsen Beach Site; 17.6 ha. E shore Seymour Arm, 51°01′20″N 119°01′45″W
- Paradise Point Site; 65.5 ha. N shore Salmon Arm; 50°48′25″N 119°09′40″W
- Rendezvous Picnic Site; 29 ha. W shore Anstey Arm, 51°05′00″N 118°55′00″W
- St.Ives Site; 5.5 ha. SW of Cinnemousun Narrows, 50°59′00″N 119°05′40″W
- Shuswap Lake East Site; 1.1 ha. SE of Cinnemousun Narrows, 50°57′55″N 118°59′00″W
- Tillis Beach Site; 27 ha. E side Salmon Arm (peninsula), 50°55′00″N 119°05′00″W
- Twin Bay Site; 15.3 ha. W shore Anstey Arm, 51°03′30″N 118°57′30″W
- Two Mile Creek Site; 17.1 ha. W shore Seymour Arm, 51°10′30″N 119°01′30″W
- Wood Landing Site; 17 ha. W shore Seymour Arm, 51°04′15″N 119°03′10″W
- Woods Landing South Site; 10.5 ha. W shore Seymour Arm, 51°02′55″N 119°03′30″W
- Wright Creek Site; 23 ha. E shore Seymour Arm, 51°08′05″N 118°59′20″W
- Roberts Bay Site; 26 ha. E shore Anstey Arm. 27. Mara Point Site; 5.8 ha. W shore Mara Lake.
