= Gardom Lake =

Lake in British Columbia

- Location within British Columbia
- Location: Enderby/Salmon Arm, British Columbia, Canada
- Coordinates: 50°36′12″N 119°12′00″W
- Type: Endorheric
- Basin countries: Canada
- Surface area: 1.27 km^{2} (0.49 sq mi)
- Average depth: 8.8 m (29 ft)
- Max. depth: 23.7 m (78 ft)
- Surface elevation: 548 m (1,798 ft)
- Frozen: December–May
- Islands: 2

Gardom Lake is a fresh water lake in Enderby and Salmon Arm, British Columbia.

== Recreation ==
Gardom Lake is home to a park, a Bible camp and a Royal Canadian Legion Camp. It is a popular fishing destination. Gardom Lake has a population of rainbow trout, which are stocked each year and are purely game fish.

== Geological information ==
Gardom Lake is on average 8.8 m. deep but has a maximum depth of 23.7 m. The total area of the lake is 1.27 km^{2}

== Ecological information ==
Along with a population of rainbow trout, Gardom Lake also has red painted turtles, black bears, bald eagles, white-tailed deer, loons, mallard ducks, hummingbirds and occasionally barn owls.

The turtles hatch in May–June and make their way to the lake, some times the mothers bury their eggs on dirt roads. Also migratory birds stop at Gardom Lake to feast on the local trout population. Bald eagles, deer and bears stay year-round. In addition to these animals, every third spring barn owls arrive to raise their chicks.

== See also ==
- List of lakes of British Columbia
