= Cinnemousun Narrows Provincial Park =

Provincial park in British Columbia

- IUCN category II (national park)
- Location within British Columbia
- Interactive map of Cinnemousun Narrows Provincial Park
- Location: Kamloops Division Yale Land District, British Columbia, Canada
- Nearest city: Kamloops, BC
- Coordinates: 50°59′39″N 119°00′54″W
- Area: 738 ha (1,820 acres)
- Established: April 27, 1956
- Governing body: BC Parks

Cinnemousun Narrows Provincial Park is a provincial park in British Columbia, Canada, located on Shuswap Lake at the convergence of the lake's four arms.

The terrain around Cinnemousun Narrows Park is mountainous to the east, but hilly to the west. The highest point nearby is 666 meters above sea level, 1.2 km south of Cinnemousun Narrows Park. Around Cinnemousun Narrows Park, it is very sparsely populated, with 2 inhabitants per square kilometer. The nearest major community is Sicamous, 11.3 miles (18.3 km) south of Cinnemousun Narrows Park.
