= Mara Lake =

Lake in British Columbia, Canada

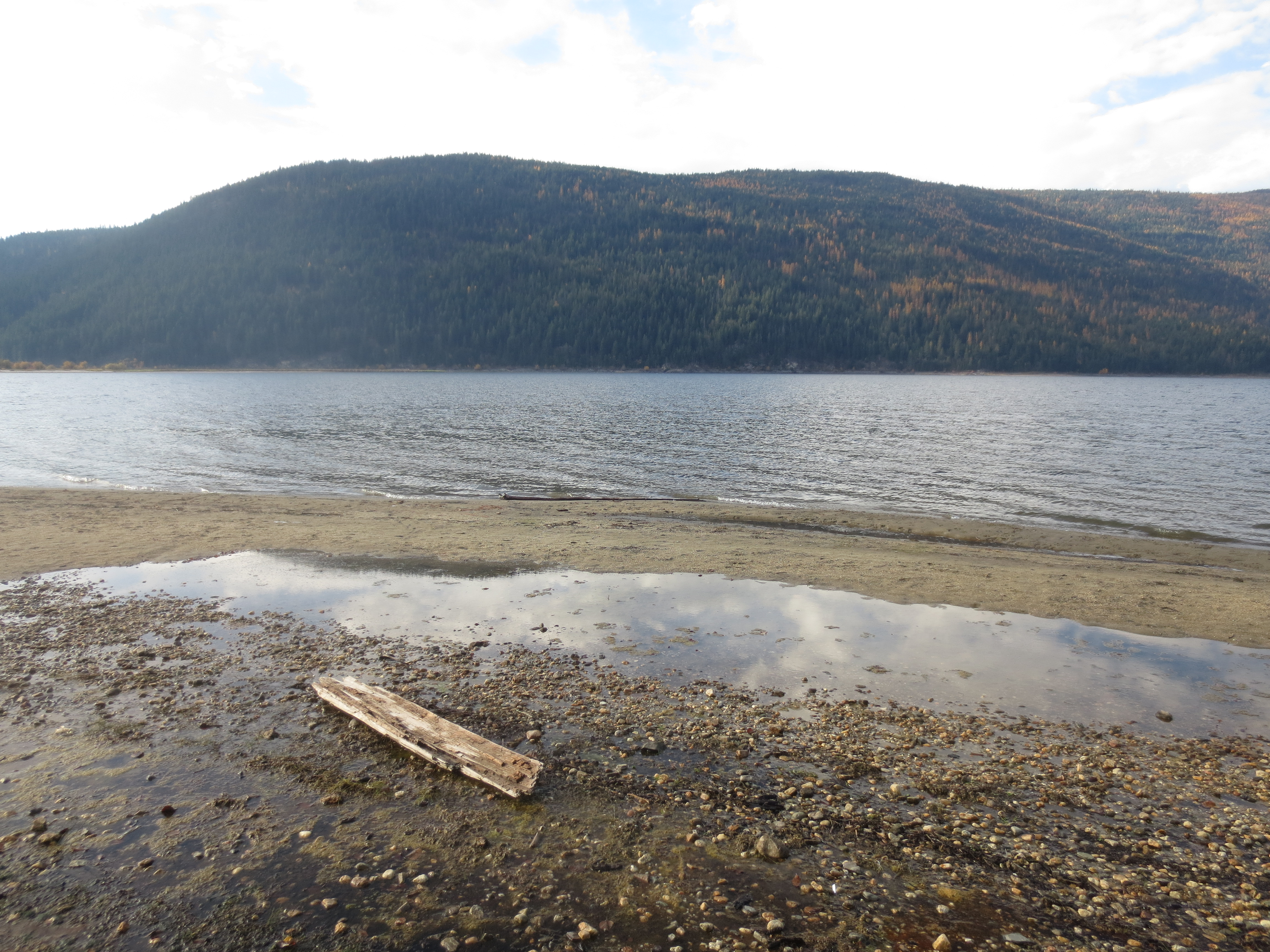
- Mara Provincial Park beach, Mara Lake, 2015

- Location within British Columbia
- Location: Shuswap Country, south central British Columbia
- Coordinates: 50°46′58″N 119°00′43″W
- Primary inflows: Shuswap River
- Primary outflows: Sicamous Narrows
- Basin countries: Canada
- Max. length: 35 km (22 mi)
- Surface area: 19.4 km^{2} (7.5 sq mi)
- Average depth: 18 m (59 ft)
- Max. depth: 18 m (59 ft)
- Surface elevation: 338 m (1,109 ft)

Mara Lake is a lake in the Shuswap Country region of south central British Columbia, Canada. To the west is Hyde Mountain and east is Morton Peak. The outlet of the Shuswap River forms the upper reaches. The lower end enters the narrows at Sicamous and flows into Shuswap Lake. The northern end of Mara Lake is by road about 73 kilometres (45 mi) west of Revelstoke, 140 kilometres (87 mi) east of Kamloops, and 75 kilometres (47 mi) north of Vernon.

== Name origin ==
John Andrew Mara owned significant ranch land between Enderby and Sicamous. He is remembered in the local names of Mara, Mara Lake, Mara Point, Mara Creek, Mara Provincial Park, Mount Mara, and Mara Meadows.

The lake was originally considered an arm of Shuswap Lake, which in due course adopted the Mara Arm identity. The Mara Lake name first appeared in provincial documentation in the mid-1880s, when the lake designation began to supersede the arm one. This corresponded with the Canadian Pacific Railway (CP) transcontinental construction.

In May 1891, the southward advance of the Shuswap and Okanagan Railway (S&O) rail head from Sicamous along the western side of the lake passed through Enderby. The location of the neighboring station, which CP named as Mara, positioned the subsequent community.

== First Nations and fur traders ==
The Secwepemc (Shuswap) First Nations have long inhabited the shores of Shuswap and Mara lakes, evidenced by the presence of pit-houses dating back over 3,200 years. At Black Point Rock, early settler Fred Dean observed pictographs on the rocks. Remains of an indigenous camp were found near King-Baker Creek in 1958, where two atlatl weights were discovered buried at the entrance to a small cave.

From the early 1820s, the people brought furs to trade at the Hudson's Bay Company (HBC) fort at Kamloops. By the 1840s, an HBC outpost opened on the western slopes of Mara Lake.

A Splats'in First Nation reserve is on the west shore at the northern end of the lake.

== Lake features and incidents ==
The lake forms the northern extreme of the Okanagan Valley. During the Last Glacial Period (LGP), glaciers filled this valley. Prior to mechanical refrigerators, blocks of ice were cut from the lake each winter.

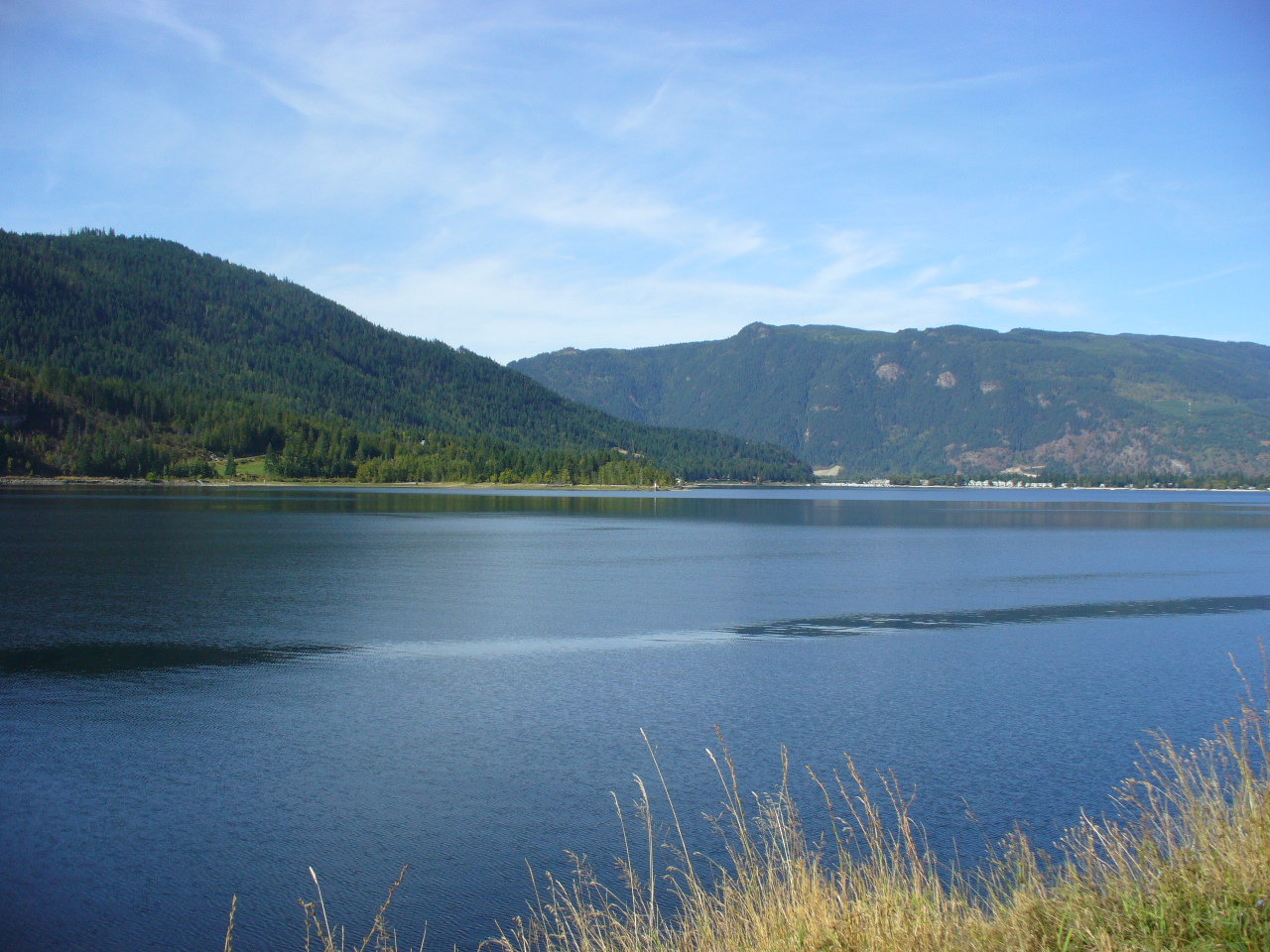
Northwest toward the narrows entrance, Mara Lake, 2011

The lake is 35.3 kilometres (21.9 mi) long. The surface area is about 1,943 hectares (4,800 acres) and elevation is 338 metres (1,109 ft) above sea level. The mean and maximum depth is 18 metres (59 ft).

In 1907, the last of the steamboats making regular trips from Savona was destroyed by fire.

In 1998, when a tanker truck rolled down an embankment into the lake, 34,000 litres (9,000 US gal; 7,500 imp gal) of heavy asphalt oil sank to the bottom forming large sticky clumps.

In 2012, a flash flood swept at least four vehicles into the lake and damaged some houseboats. Days later, a 20,000-litre (5,300 US gal; 4,400 imp gal) gas tanker truck plunged into the lake.

== Earlier Mara community ==
The Okanagan Valley was progressively settled northward. Defining the Mara community as stretching from the southern tip of the lake to about 1.3 kilometres (0.8 mi) south of the Riverside Rd junction, homesteaders did not arrive until the mid-1880s. Prior to the S&O construction in 1891, the Red Star II replaced the stage in carrying freight and mail upstream during the summer months.

The more significant early settlers were John (1885) and Marie (1889) Moser, Thomas Gray (1887), Rev Joseph Edward Rosoman (1893), Dave Shannon (1895), and Fred Dean (1901).

S. Appleby was the inaugural postmaster 1893–1895. Members of the Rosoman family held this position 1896–1949.

In August 1895, the school opened. To provide permanent accommodation, a one-room log schoolhouse was erected in 1898. By this time on the west shore, a general store and community hall existed.

In 1900, a one-room frame building replaced the schoolhouse.

In 1904, Robert Mowat made Mara the base for his portable sawmill, admitted J.L.Ruttan as a partner, and upgraded to a 6,100-metre (20,000 ft) daily capacity mill, called the Rothesay Lumber Co. The mill was located near the east end of the bridge.

By 1905, a hotel existed but may have been little more than the mill boarding house.

In 1907, the cemetery was established.

In 1909, a new store and residence/boarding house were erected. Weeks later, the station and bridge were saved in the May fire, but the sawmill, numerous residences, and other structures were lost. The Rothesay liquidator tendered for sale salvageable items from the uninsured mill.

Opening in 1911 were a new hotel and new hall. The next year, the Anglican church building opened. In 1917, the two-room frame schoolhouse was erected. About this time, Thomas Gray operated a small store on his east shore farm.

In 1968, the west side store relocated to the present highway location, being called the Mara Foodliner.

In 1970, the community hall was extended.

In 1975, the post office and school closed.

== Other localities surrounding the lake ==
South of Sicamous, in a clockwise direction, are the following:

=== Two Mile ===
About 4 kilometres (2 mi) south of Sicamous on the east shore of Mara Lake, Ross Graham ran a sawmill for about a decade, before burning down in 1949. The site later became the Two Mile Trailer Court, which was renamed the Sicamous Creek Mobile Home Park. In 2019, Brent Misura purchased the property. Two years later, he sought planning approval for five more units.

Weather-related evacuation alerts are common for the community.

=== Swansea Point ===
Swansea Point is a 0.5-square-kilometre (0.2 mi^{2}) alluvial fan formed by sediment deposited by Mara Creek and Hummingbird Creek.

Census population: Swansea Point
| Year | Pop. | ±% |
|---|---|---|
| 1986 | 207 | — |
| 1991 | 205 | −1.0% |
| 1996 | | — |
| 2001 | | — |
| 2006 | 243 | — |
| 2011 | 193 | −20.6% |
| 2016 | 161 | −16.6% |
| 2021 | 235 | +46.0% |
Source: Statistics Canada

Arriving in the early 1900s, Mr. Worthington was the first settler. He homesteaded on 28 hectares (70 acres) adjacent to the north of the later Hummingbird Resort. On the third resale, the Young family bought the Worthington property in 1934 and established the first resort. They erected four small log cabins, which they called the Black Point Resort. In 1936, Swansea Resort Ltd, owned by the Swanson family, bought the property. The next summer, Swansea Resort opened.

When the relief camp disbanded, the Stephens family bought the Hummingbird site and started a tourist camp. In the late 1930s, the Swansons bought the 16 hectares (40 acres) adjacent to the east of their resort to provide highway access. The family opened a general store, gas station, and tea room on Swanson Rd, which was formerly the highway. Both the Hummingbird and Swansea resorts were popular prior to World War II and were revived after the war. In the 1950s, the gas station site became the Mara Lake Resort. Over time, the remainder of the property was subdivided.

Around 1980 Swansea Point began to replace the former name of Six Mile.

In 1997 and 2012 heavy rains caused large debris flows at Hummingbird Creek, which significantly impacted lives, houses, septic systems, and highway infrastructure. Remedial action, which began in 2013, has minimized this risk. Since the early 2000s a new resort has been constructed along Hummingbird Creek, comprising recreational cabins and townhouses.

As of 2021 Swansea Point had about 400 dwellings, only 30 per cent of which were permanently occupied.

=== King-Baker Creek ===
King-Baker Creek is by road about 3 kilometres (2 mi) south of Swansea Point. The creek is likely named after Sidney and Violet King-Baker, who purchased land in 1929 and built two vacation cabins, one for personal use and the other for visitors. Violet bequeathed the property to Ethna Revel, who suffered a stroke in 1990 at the cabin, dying three weeks later.

In the immediate vicinity were the Cedar View Cabins dating at least from the late 1940s. By the early 1960s, the lakeshore property included a large motel unit, eight cottages, a campground, and store. By the early 1980s, the site was called the Kingbaker Creek Resort. By the mid-aughts, 25 campsites and five cabins existed.

In 2015 a mudslide damaged and moved a house off its foundation, pushed several vehicles from the property onto the highway, and closed the highway for several hours.

In 2022 Pinnacle Lifestyles acquired the resort and renamed it the Mara Lake RV & Beach Club.

=== Southern end of the lake ===
Resorts developed in the 1960s were the Mara Sands (formerly called the Silver Birch), the Willow Shores, and the Crystal Sands.

The Cherokee Resort existed by the early 1970s. In 1991, this venue was renamed the Club Mara Resort.

Mara Provincial Park is in the vicinity.

In Mara proper are the community church (built 1912) and the community hall (built 1911). To the southeast, along the highway is the cemetery beside the Foodliner store/gas bar.

=== Mara Hills ===
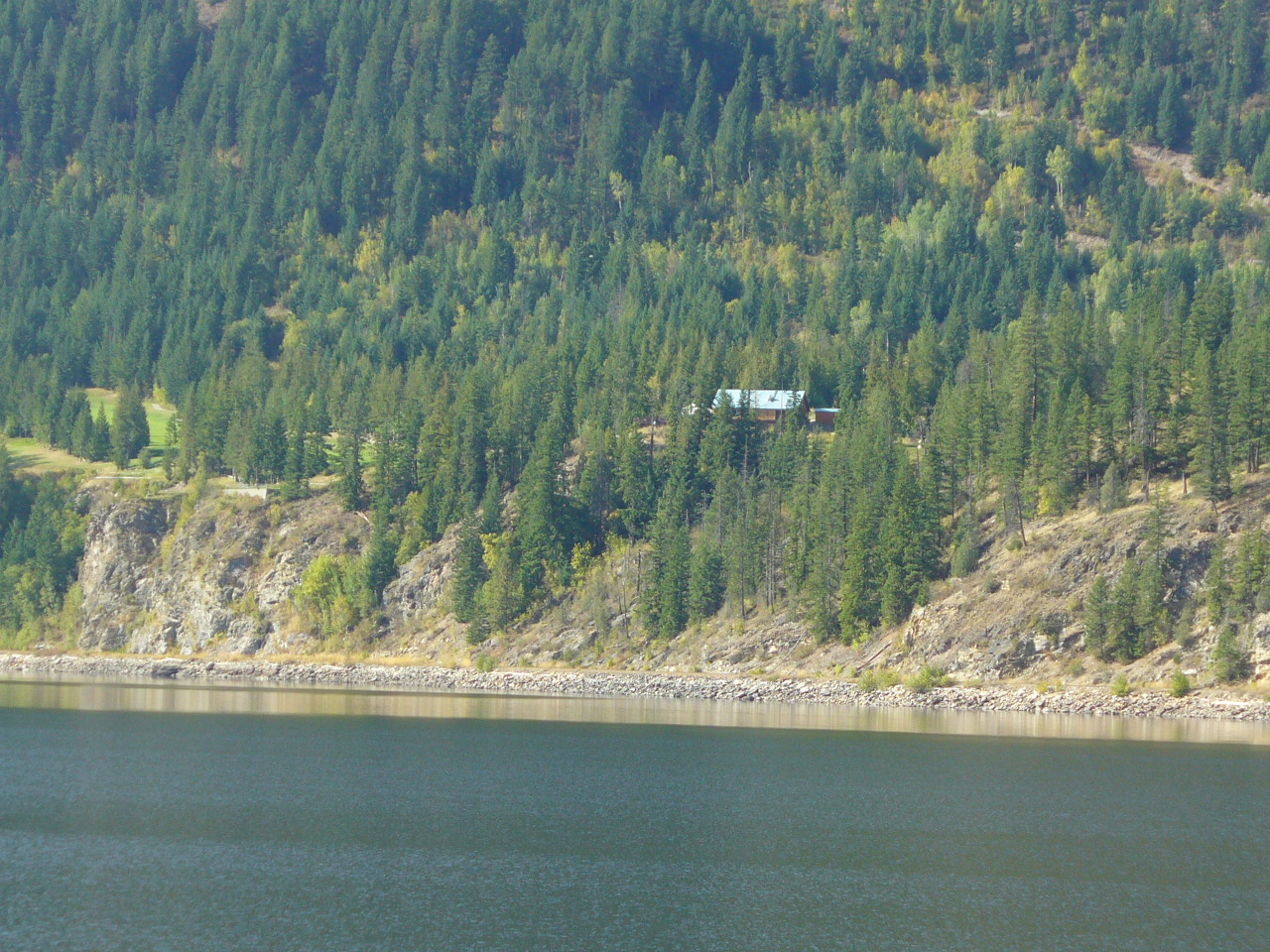
Westward view of the MaraHills Golf Course, Mara Lake, 2011

Opened in 2002, the 18-hole championship Hyde Mountain on Mara Lake Golf Course was designed by Les Furber. The rename to MaraHills Golf Resort occurred in 2021, when PintoWest Properties paid $5.3 million for the 107-hectare (264-acre) property, which comprised the golf course, marina, restaurant and bar, pro shop and helicopter pad.

In June 2022 PintoWest reversed its decision to be included in a planned boundary expansion by the District of Sicamous. Also that month, GolfNorth Properties entered into a long-term lease of the resort. That August, during the first phase of the property development, all 100 available lots sold for a total of $13 million. The potential development is up to 1,000 units.

=== Mara Point area ===
Rolf Wallgren Bruhn had a pole yard, giving rise to the name Pole Yard Point. The site later became the Carney pole yard.

The Shandy Cove Resort opened in 1968.

The area includes Shandy Cove, about 35 properties along Mara West Road, and the Mara Point site of the Shuswap Lake Marine Provincial Park.

== Main road ==
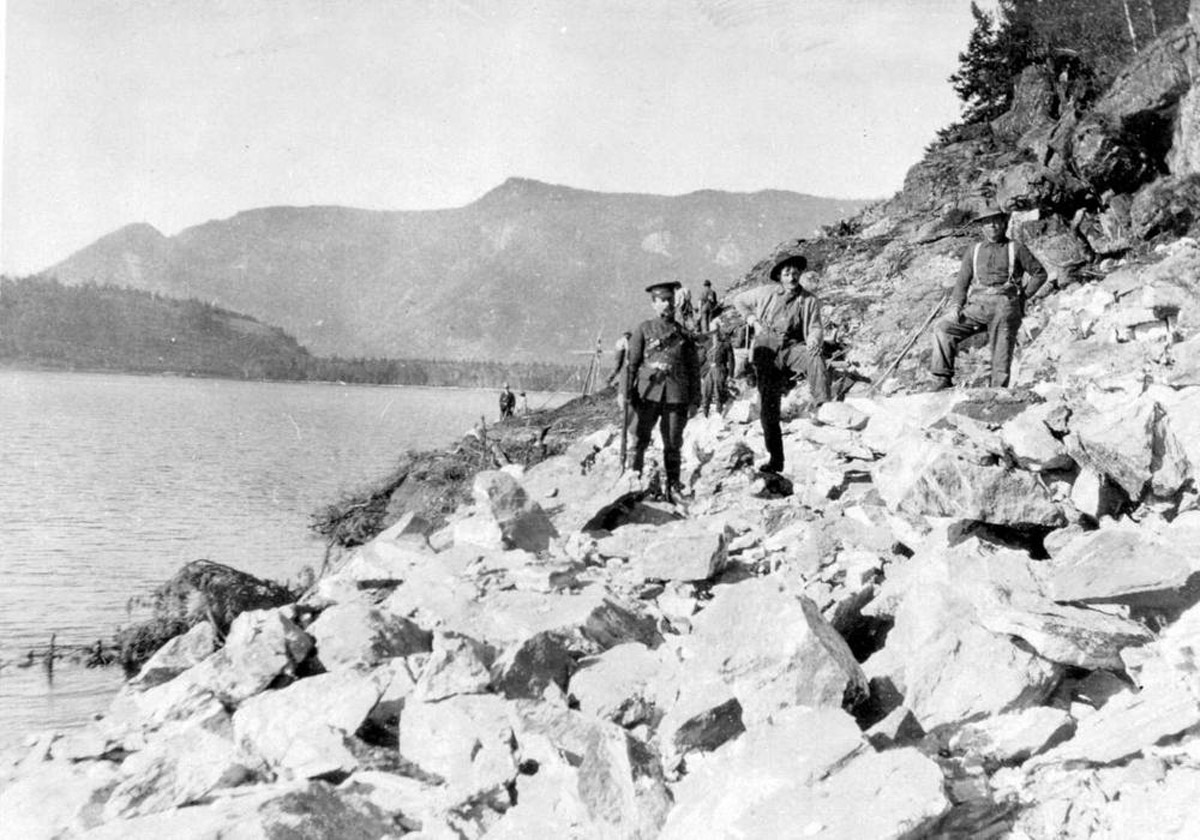
Roadbuilding, Mara Lake, c.1916

In 1887 a narrow and swampy in places wagon road was built to supersede the trail southward along the western side of Mara Lake, which connected Sicamous and Enderby. Schubert Bros. established a stage service on the route, but the railway construction severely damaged the road.

Prior to World War I, a trail existed southward to Two Mile, which was followed by a gap to the present Mara Provincial Park.

After the war a 4-kilometre (2.5 mi) gap to Sicamous remained for several years.

At the end of 1921 the wagon road along the east shore was completed.

In 1972 flash floods submerged or washed away sections of the highway.

== Internment camps ==
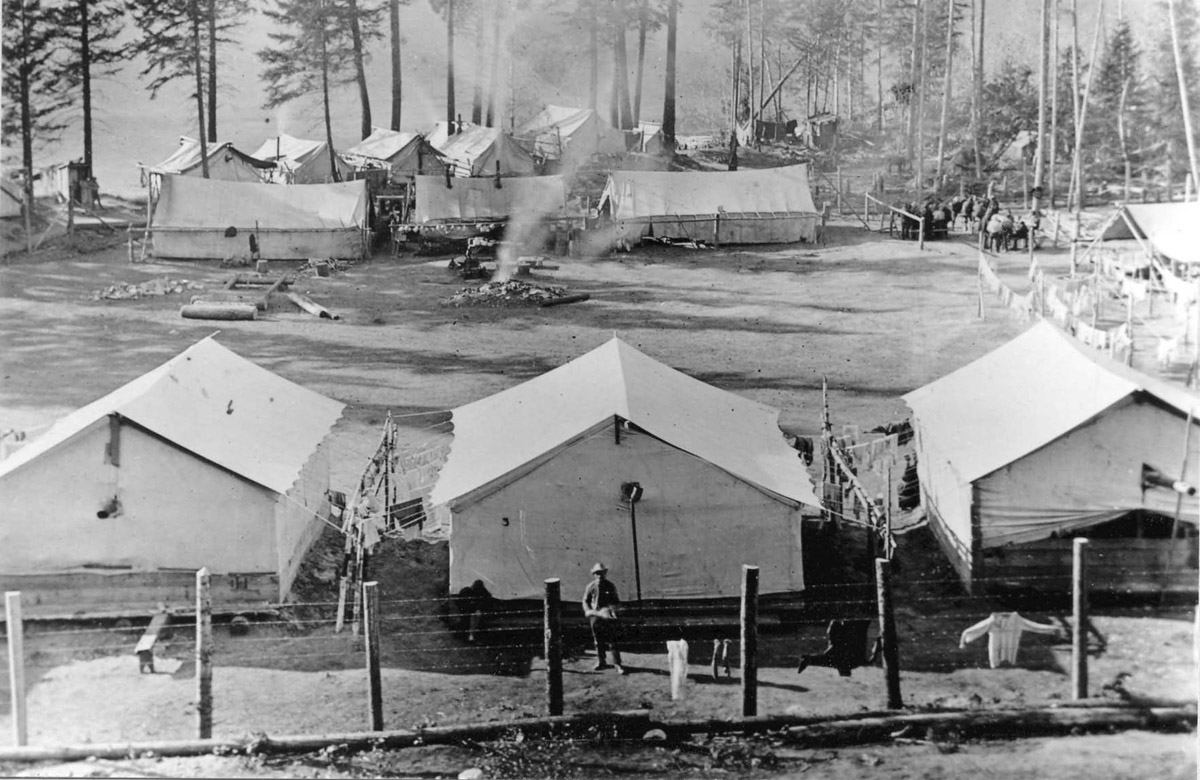
Six Mile Internment Camp, Mara Lake, 1917

The wagon road along the western side of Mara Lake having been destroyed, interned aliens built sections of a new road along the eastern side during World War I. The camps, which operated June 1915 – July 1917, spent winter at Two Mile and summer at Six Mile. Rolf Wallgren Bruhn was the road superintendent. The shore road along the southern part of the lake was blasted through rocky cliffs, with rock removal and grading by hand. A commemorative marker exists about 40 metres (131 ft) south of the Wolfe Rd junction. The Hummingbird Beach Resort at Swansea Point now occupies the former camp site.

== Railway ==
In 1898 a derailed train proceeded some distance.

In 1907 a snowplow derailed, delaying a passenger train.

In 1913 additional sidings and a new station building on the east side of the tracks were installed at Mara.

In 1921 the southbound mail car caught fire when mailbags were stacked too close to the stove. On discovery of the fire, some mail was rescued at Mara, but the car was destroyed.

In the early 1930s B.J. Carney loaded poles at the Mara siding.

In 1932 a northbound passenger train fatally struck a man on the track 3 kilometres (2 mi) north of Mara.

In 1940 a southbound train fatally struck a man in the vicinity of Black Point.

The Mara train station comprised two rooms. The building was later vandalized and burned down. But another CP building has been moved back from the right-of-way to become the Mara Station Bed & Breakfast. To the southwest of the MaraHills Golf Resort was the Fossett passing track, named after CP roadmaster Charles Fossett.

In 1964 the passing track car capacity was 15 at Fossett and 60 at Mara.

== Ferries and bridges ==
=== Mara Lake ===
To connect the roadbuilding endeavours with the railway line on the opposite side of the lake, a ferry operated during World War I.

=== Mara ===
In August 1895 a cable ferry was installed, enabling east shore settlers to access the train station across the river. In May 1897, new cable towers were erected.

A 200-metre (655 ft) 18-span bridge opened in January 1899. The replacement, which opened in 1913, comprised two 38-metre (125 ft) Howe trusses, a 41-metre (136 ft) pony Howe truss swing span, and 82 metres (268 ft) of approaches.

In 1928 a 40-metre (130 ft) Howe truss and 27-bay trestle bridge opened.

In 1982 the Mara bridge was replaced.

== Maps ==
- Map of pre-emptions.
- "Shuswap sheet map". geography.ua.edu. 1898.
- "Rand McNally BC map". www.davidrumsey.com. 1925.
- "Standard Oil BC map". www.davidrumsey.com. 1937.

== See also ==
- List of lakes of British Columbia
- Tributaries of the Fraser
