= Regional District of North Okanagan =

Regional district in British Columbia, Canada

North Okanagan
- Regional district
- Regional District of North Okanagan
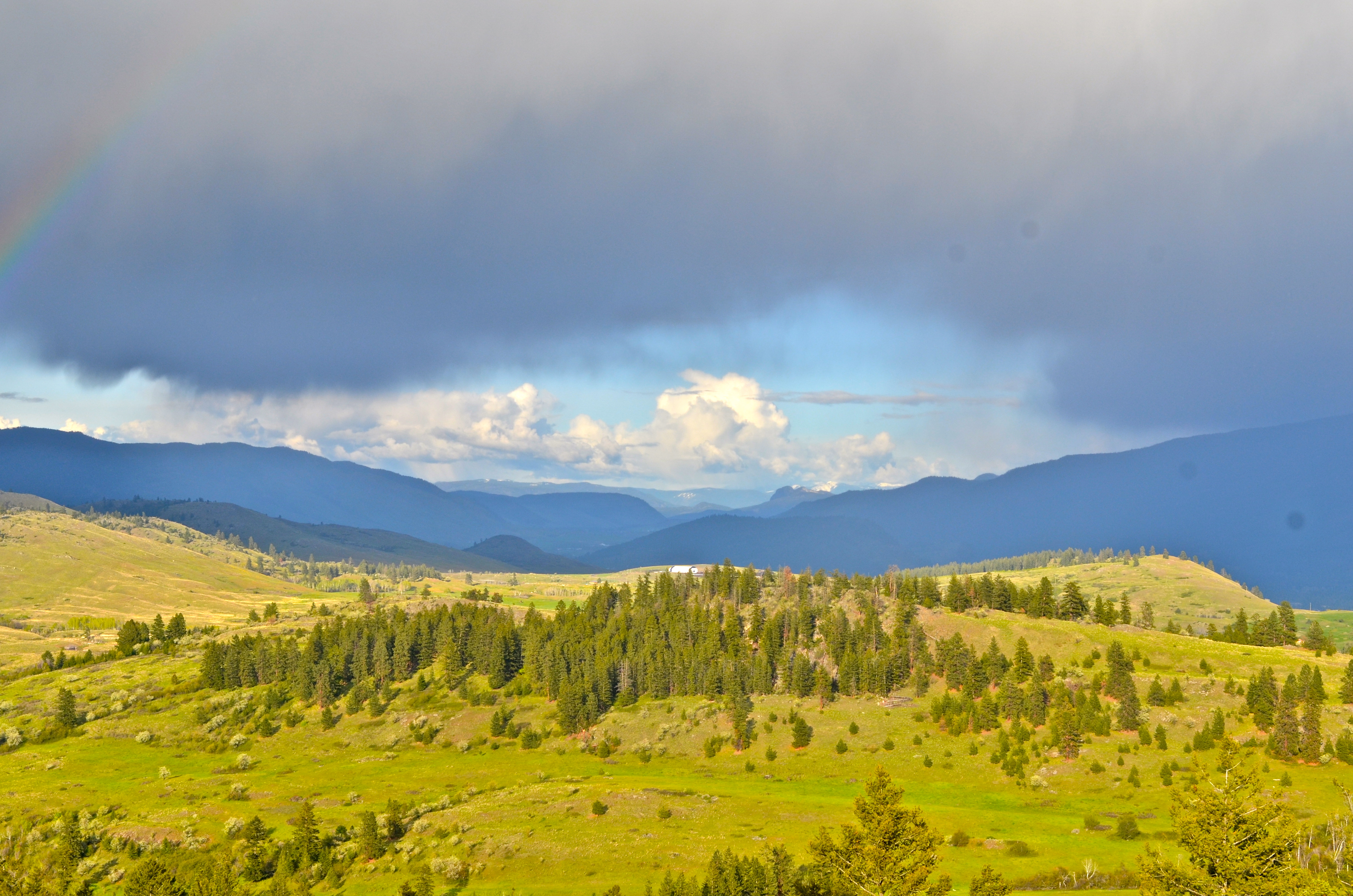
- Rainbow over Lumby

- Location in British Columbia
- Country: Canada
- Province: British Columbia
- Administrative office location: Coldstream

Government
  - Type: Regional district
  - Body: Board of Directors
  - Chair: Kevin Acton (Lumby)
  - Vice Chair: Amanda Shatzko (C)
  - Electoral Areas: B; C; D; E; F

Area
  - Land: 7,502.60 km^{2} (2,896.77 sq mi)

Population (2016)
  - Total: 84,354
  - Density: 11.2/km^{2} (29/sq mi)
- Website: www.rdno.ca

The Regional District of North Okanagan (RDNO) is a regional district in the Canadian province of British Columbia, Canada. The Canada 2011 Census population was 81,237. The land area is 7,512.58 km^{2} (2,900.62 sq mi). The regional district's head office is in the district municipality of Coldstream, although the largest population centre is its immediate neighbour, the city of Vernon.

== Demographics ==
As a census division in the 2021 Census of Population conducted by Statistics Canada, the Regional District of North Okanagan had a population of 91,610 living in 38,821 of its 42,722 total private dwellings, a change of 8.6% from its 2016 population of 84,344. With a land area of 7,497.23 km^{2} (2,894.70 sq mi), it had a population density of 12.2/km^{2} (31.6/sq mi) in 2021.

Panethnic groups in the North Okanagan Regional District (2001−2021)
| Panethnic group | 2021 | | 2016 | | 2011 | | 2006 | | 2001 | |
| Panethnic group | Pop. | % | Pop. | % | Pop. | % | Pop. | % | Pop. | % |
|---|---|---|---|---|---|---|---|---|---|---|
| European (Note: Statistic includes all persons that did not make up part of a visible minority or an indigenous identity.) | 77,375 | 86.44% | 72,615 | 88.07% | 70,785 | 89.41% | 68,820 | 90.33% | 66,360 | 91.7% |
| Indigenous | 7,100 | 7.93% | 6,350 | 7.7% | 6,030 | 7.62% | 4,905 | 6.44% | 3,505 | 4.84% |
| South Asian | 1,390 | 1.55% | 900 | 1.09% | 540 | 0.68% | 835 | 1.1% | 1,135 | 1.57% |
| East Asian (Note: Statistic includes total responses of "Chinese", "Korean", and "Japanese" under visible minority section on census.) | 1,375 | 1.54% | 1,255 | 1.52% | 870 | 1.1% | 915 | 1.2% | 905 | 1.25% |
| Southeast Asian (Note: Statistic includes total responses of "Filipino" and "Southeast Asian" under visible minority section on census.) | 1,075 | 1.2% | 690 | 0.84% | 325 | 0.41% | 195 | 0.26% | 180 | 0.25% |
| African | 470 | 0.53% | 205 | 0.25% | 175 | 0.22% | 165 | 0.22% | 80 | 0.11% |
| Latin American | 295 | 0.33% | 205 | 0.25% | 170 | 0.21% | 150 | 0.2% | 70 | 0.1% |
| Middle Eastern (Note: Statistic includes total responses of "West Asian" and "Arab" under visible minority section on census.) | 225 | 0.25% | 140 | 0.17% | 105 | 0.13% | 95 | 0.12% | 40 | 0.06% |
| Other (Note: Statistic includes total responses of "Visible minority, n.i.e." and "Multiple visible minorities" under visible minority section on census.) | 200 | 0.22% | 105 | 0.13% | 165 | 0.21% | 115 | 0.15% | 80 | 0.11% |
| Total responses | 89,510 | 97.71% | 82,455 | 97.75% | 79,165 | 97.45% | 76,190 | 98.56% | 72,370 | 98.83% |
| Total population (Note: Totals greater than 100% due to multiple origin responses.) | 91,610 | 100% | 84,354 | 100% | 81,237 | 100% | 77,301 | 100% | 73,227 | 100% |

== Subdivisions ==
Cities

- Armstrong - 4,815
- Enderby - 2,964
- Vernon - 40,116

District municipalities

- Coldstream - 10,314
- Spallumcheen - 5,055

Village

- Lumby - 2,000

Regional district electoral areas

- North Okanagan B
- North Okanagan C
- North Okanagan D
- North Okanagan E
- North Okanagan F

Indian reserves NB These are excluded from governance by the regional district and have their own governments (the Spallumcheen Indian Band and the Okanagan Indian Band).

- Enderby Indian Reserve No. 2
- Harris Indian Reserve No. 3
- Okanagan Indian Reserve No. 1 (only partly within the RD)
- Priest's Valley Indian Reserve No. 6
