= Shuswap River =

Coordinates: 50°43′00″N 119°03′00″W

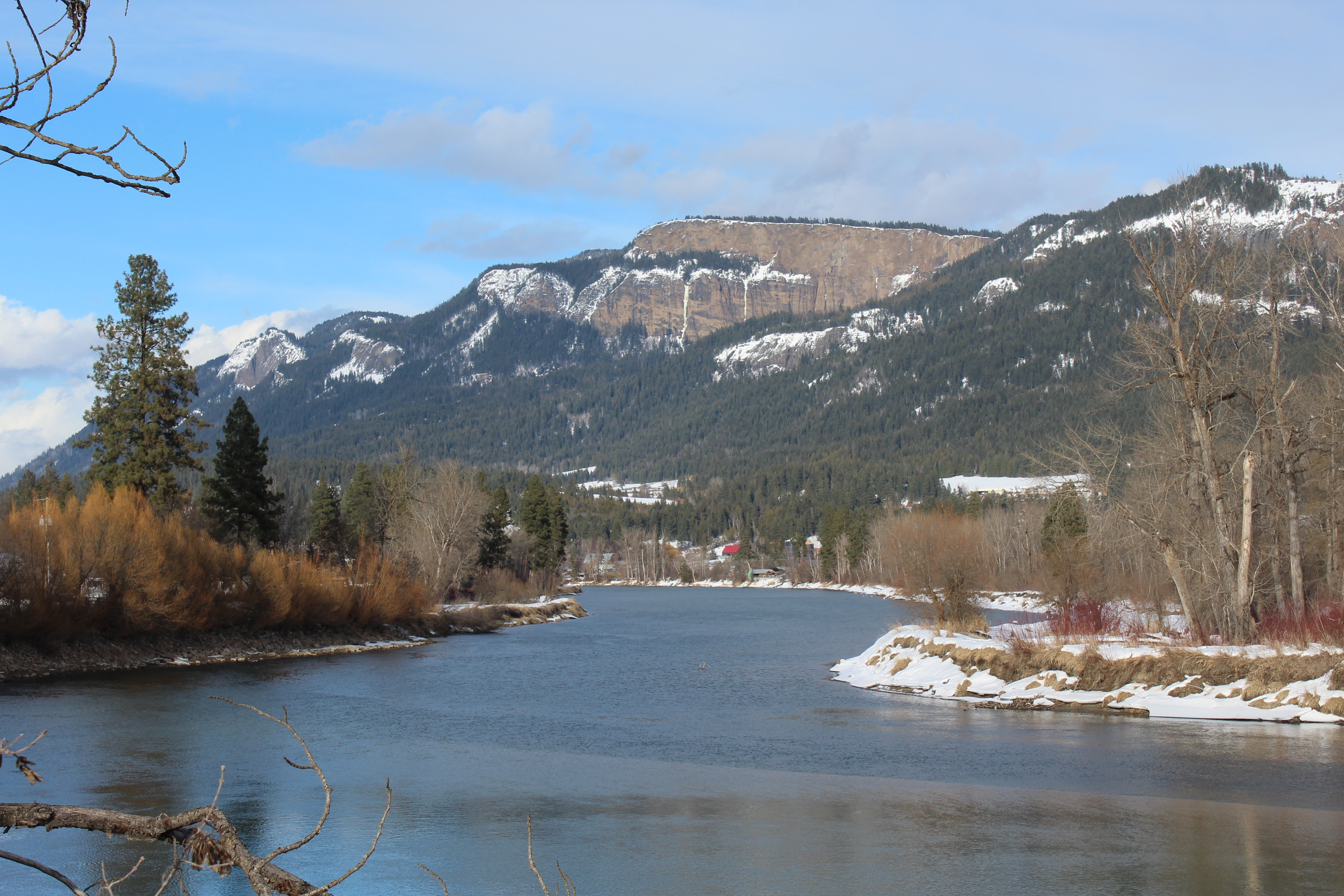
- Shuswap River at Enderby, with Enderby Cliffs in background

Physical characteristics
- Mouth: Shuswap Lake at Sicamous
- Length: 150 km (93 mi)

The basin of the Shuswap River (pronounced /ˈʃuːʃwɑːp/) lies northeast of the Okanagan Valley in British Columbia, originating in the central Monashee Mountains. It is the upper part of the drainage better known to British Columbians as belonging to Shuswap Lake and the South Thompson River. The river's drainage basin is over 1,969 square kilometres (760 sq mi) in area.

== Geography ==
The 150-kilometre (93 mi) river is in three sections, an upper part beginning at Joss Pass, at the northern end of the Sawtooth Range of the Monashees and emptying into Sugar Lake southeast of the south end of that range. The next section of the river curves south from Sugar Lake to wind up running north again before entering Mabel Lake, which is a fair-sized mountain lake as typical of much of Interior British Columbia (e.g. Shuswap and Adams Lakes elsewhere in the same season, the original Arrow Lakes and Kootenay Lake). Below Mabel Lake is the last stretch of the river west towards the town of Enderby at the north end of the Okanagan Corridor, after which the Shuswap River drains into Mara Lake. Mara Lake is connected via a channel named Sicamous Narrows to the Salmon Arm of Shuswap Lake at Sicamous.

Tributaries of the upper Shuswap River and Sugar Lake include Greenbush Creek, Spectrum Creek, and Outlet Creek. The middle river from Sugar and Mabel Lakes is fed by Cherry Creek, Ferry Creek, Duteau Creek, Bessette Creek, and Wap Creek. The lower river below Mabel Lake is fed by Kingfisher Creek, Trinity Creek, and Fortune Creek.

== History ==
The Shuswap River has a long history of use for transporting both people and goods. Log Drives were once an annual event, with logs sent down the river from Mabel Lake during the high waters of spring runoff to the many lumber mills along the banks of the Shuswap River in Enderby, Grindrod and Mara. During the late 1800s, paddlewheelers transported goods and people up the Shuswap River from Mara Lake to Enderby at Fortune's Landing, where they would be transported by stagecoach to Okanagan Landing west of Vernon. Many a paddlewheeler became beached on shifting sandbars in the river, and transportation was slow. With the opening of the Shuswap-Okanagan Railway in 1892, the need for paddlewheelers on the Shuswap River declined.

== Recreation ==
The Shuswap River is now a popular destination for canoeing, kayaking and tubing. The Shuswap Hut and Trail Alliance is proposing a Hut and Trail system which will join the Shuswap River waterway to over 280 km of mountain hiking trails surrounding Shuswap Lake. The Annual Kayak Rodeo is held at the beginning of June at the Kingfisher Rapids near Mabel Lake. Fishing is popular during the annual Salmon Run in late August - early September.

== See also ==
- List of rivers of British Columbia
- List of tributaries of the Fraser River
