= Splatsin First Nation =

First Nation band

The Splats'in First Nation, formerly known as the Spallumcheen Indian Band, is a member of the Secwepemc (Shuswap) Nation, located in the Central Interior region of the Canadian province of British Columbia. Its main Indian reserve is located at Enderby, British Columbia. It was created when the government of the then-Colony of British Columbia established an Indian reserve system in the 1860s. It is a member government of the Shuswap Nation Tribal Council.

In the 1960s/1970s, the band had a population of 350, but 100 of their children were removed by child welfare authorities as part of the Sixties Scoop.

In 1980 members of the Spallumcheen Band travelled to Vancouver to protest the Provincial government. The protest involved a march with hundreds of First Nations people, through downtown Vancouver. The protest was sparked by the high numbers of Indigenous children being removed from the Splats'in nation, throughout the previous 20 years, and being adopted out to non-Indigenous families, or non-Indigenous foster homes. The protest brought a positive result for the Splats'in community, the Provincial and Federal governments’ allowed the Band to have control over their own child welfare system. The granting of jurisdiction to the band was made possible through an Indian Act by-law. The by-law was passed in 1980, titled Spallumcheen Indian Band By-law #3 – A By-law of the Care of Our Indian Children. The reason they were able to grant the Band this autonomy was due to a provision in The Indian Act by-laws. Spallumcheen Band utilized section 81(1), (a), (c), and (d). The Splats'in, to date, still have control over their child welfare. Due to a new interpretation of the by-law provisions, by the Department of Indigenous and Northern Affairs Canada (INAC), no Band or First Nation since the Spallumcheen Band have been afforded the same autonomy.

== Indian Reserves ==
The band has three reserves only:

- Enderby Indian Reserve No. 2, at the town of Enderby, on the Shuswap River at the mouth of Fortune Creek, 2267 ha.50°33′00″N 119°08′00″W It is near Enderby, British Columbia.
- Salmon River Indian Reserve No. 1, on the right bank of the Salmon River two miles north of Glenemma, 1559.30 ha. 50°30′00″N 119°19′00″W
- Sicamous Indian Reserve No. 3, on the west shore of Mara Lake, two miles south of the Sicamous CPR station, 79.8 ha.50°49′00″N 119°00′00″W
