= Enderby, British Columbia =

Enderby
- City
- The Corporation of the City of Enderby
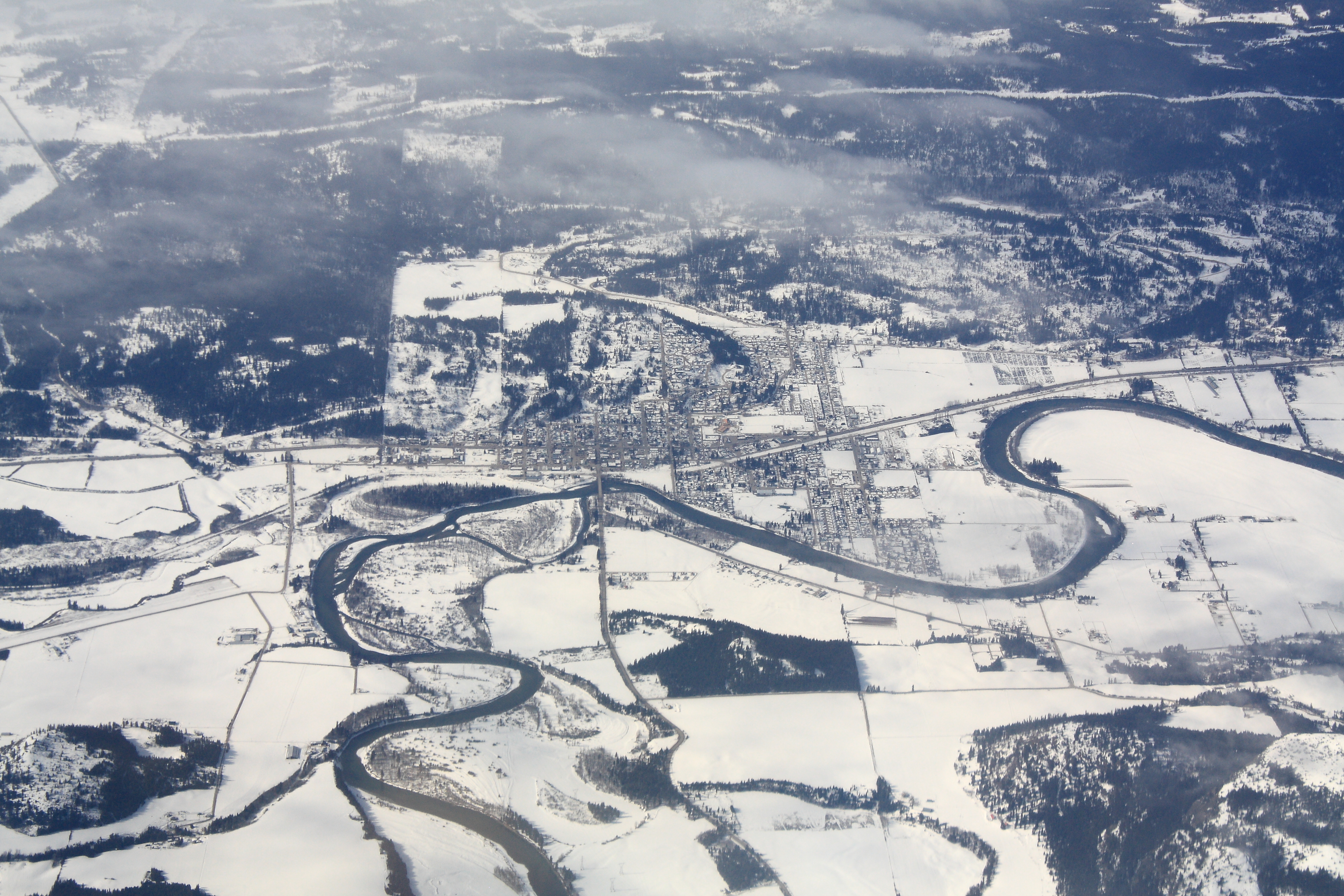

- Location of Enderby in British Columbia
- Coordinates: 50°33′3″N 119°08′23″W
- Country: Canada
- Province: British Columbia
- Region: Okanagan; Shuswap
- Regional district: North Okanagan
- Founded: 1866, by Alexander Leslie Fortune (first white settler)
- Incorporated: 1905

Government
  - Governing body: Enderby City Council
  - Mayor: Roanne Davyduke
  - MP: Mel Arnold
  - MLA: David Williams

Area
  - City: 4.26 km^{2} (1.64 sq mi)
- Elevation: 360 m (1,180 ft)

Population (2021)
  - City: 3,028
  - Density: 711/km^{2} (1,840/sq mi)
  - Urban: 3,028
- Time zone: UTC−07:00 (PT)
- Postal code span: V0E 1V0
- Area codes: 250, 778, 236, 672
- Highways: Highway 97A
- Waterways: Shuswap River
- Website: cityofenderby.com

The City of Enderby is in the North Okanagan region of the Canadian province of British Columbia, between Armstrong and Salmon Arm. It is approximately 80 km north of Kelowna and 130 km east of Kamloops. Highway 97A passes through Enderby and the Shuswap River marks the eastern and northeastern limits of the City. There are two major schools in Enderby: M.V. Beattie Elementary School and A.L. Fortune Secondary School. M.V. Beattie Elementary School was rebuilt in 2012.

The rural area surrounding Enderby is made up of the communities of Ashton Creek, Grandview Bench, Grindrod, Kingfisher, Mara, Splatsin Reserve, Springbend and Trinity Valley. The rural area is 2,108.46 square kilometres. Several smaller lakes, including Gardom Lake and Hidden Lake, are also located in the area.

== History ==
The first name used for the area was Fortune's Landing after the first landowner in the area and the steamboat stop at his farm. From 1876 the steamboat stopped at the new Lambly brothers' warehouse, and the town became known variously as Lambly's Landing or Steamboat Landing despite the provincial government having named the townsite Belvidere.

In 1887, plans were made for a post office at the town and townsfolk began debating what its formal name should be. That year, the snow melt in the mountains caused a particularly high flood of the Shushwap river in the area. It coincided with a meeting of the town's literary group, and one of the members read the poem "The High Tide on the Coast of Lincolnshire, 1571" by Jean Ingelow about a flood in Lincolnshire, England, of which local inhabitants were warned by the bells of Boston Stump ringing a peal titled "Brides of Enderby". Although others were suggested, Enderby was chosen as the most appropriate name. There are three places called Enderby in Lincolnshire, all in East Lindsey district: Bag Enderby, Mavis Enderby and Wood Enderby.

== Geography ==
Latitude-Longitude: 50°33′03.0″N 119°08′22.7″W elevation: 360 metres

== Demographics ==
Historical population

Year	Pop.	±%
1921	783	—
1931	555	−29.1%
1941	538	−3.1%
1951	877	+63.0%
1956	965	+10.0%
1961	1,075	+11.4%

Year	Pop.	±%
1966	1,114	+3.6%
1971	1,158	+3.9%
1976	1,482	+28.0%
1981	1,816	+22.5%
1986	1,714	−5.6%
1991	2,128	+24.2%

Year	Pop.	±%
1996	2,754	+29.4%
2001	2,818	+2.3%
2006	2,828	+0.4%
2011	2,932	+3.7%
2016	2,964	+1.1%
2021	3,028	+2.2%

Sources: Statistics Canada

In the 2021 Census of Population conducted by Statistics Canada, Enderby had a population of 3,028 living in 1,436 of its 1,508 total private dwellings, a change of 2.2% from its 2016 population of 2,964. With a land area of 4.26 km^{2} (1.64 sq mi), it had a population density of 710.8/km^{2} (1,841.0/sq mi) in 2021.

=== Ethnicity ===
Panethnic groups in the City of Enderby (1991−2021)
Panethnic group	2021		2016		2011		2006		2001		1996		1991	
Panethnic group	Pop.	%	Pop.	%	Pop.	%	Pop.	%	Pop.	%	Pop.	%	Pop.	%
European (Note: Statistic includes all persons that did not make up part of a visible minority or an indigenous identity.)	2,570	86.24%	2,610	89.08%	2,690	90.57%	2,560	91.59%	2,595	93.51%	2,605	95.77%	1,975	95.64%
Indigenous	315	10.57%	250	8.53%	245	8.25%	140	5.01%	145	5.23%	95	3.49%	45	2.18%
Southeast Asian (Note: Statistic includes total responses of "Filipino" and "Southeast Asian" under visible minority section on census.)	40	1.34%	10	0.34%	10	0.34%	0	0%	0	0%	0	0%	0	0%
South Asian	15	0.5%	0	0%	0	0%	10	0.36%	15	0.54%	0	0%	0	0%
East Asian (Note: Statistic includes total responses of "Chinese", "Korean", and "Japanese" under visible minority section on census.)	0	0%	45	1.54%	25	0.84%	50	1.79%	25	0.9%	20	0.74%	35	1.69%
Latin American	0	0%	30	1.02%	0	0%	25	0.89%	0	0%	0	0%	0	0%
African	0	0%	0	0%	0	0%	10	0.36%	0	0%	0	0%	10	0.48%
Middle Eastern (Note: Statistic includes total responses of "West Asian" and "Arab" under visible minority section on census.)	0	0%	0	0%	0	0%	10	0.36%	0	0%	0	0%	0	0%
Other/multiracial (Note: Statistic includes total responses of "Visible minority, n.i.e." and "Multiple visible minorities" under visible minority section on census.)	0	0%	0	0%	0	0%	20	0.72%	0	0%	0	0%	—N/a	—N/a
Total responses	2,980	98.41%	2,930	98.85%	2,970	101.3%	2,795	98.83%	2,775	98.47%	2,720	98.77%	2,065	97.04%
Total population	3,028	100%	2,964	100%	2,932	100%	2,828	100%	2,818	100%	2,754	100%	2,128	100%
Note: Totals greater than 100% due to multiple origin responses.

=== Religion ===
According to the 2021 census, religious groups in Enderby included:

- Irreligion (1,755 persons or 58.9%)
- Christianity (1,185 persons or 39.8%)
- Buddhism (10 persons or 0.3%)
- Other (20 persons or 0.7%)

== Economy ==
Agriculture, industry, retail, and tourism are the main components of the economy.

A variety of agricultural and industrial enterprises are located in the area, including dairy farming, cattle ranching, fertilizer and feed production, mills, and value-added wood products. Farms include diverse livestock such as llamas, bison, and deer.

== Sports and recreation tourism ==
Enderby is known for the variety of outdoor activities, including tubefloating, hiking, canoeing and kayaking, golfing, snowmobiling, and cross-country skiing. It is home to the Enderby Memorial Arena and Curling Rink, ball diamonds, and an outdoor public pool.

The Enderby Cliffs, a BC Provincial Park, is a popular hiking destination. Other hiking destinations include Mara Provincial Park and Larch Hills. The Shuswap River is known for its tubefloating, canoeing, and kayaking. It hosted the Canoe Nationals in 2008. The Kingfisher Kayak Rodeo is held annually. There are two golf courses in the area: Mabel Lake Golf & Country Club and Birchdale Golf Course. To the east of Enderby is Hunters Range Trail System, a snowmobile range with approximately 200 square kilometres trails. Also in the area is the Larch Hills Cross Country Ski Trails.

In 1921 the original Enderby Arena was constructed. It was converted to a curling rink when a new steel frame arena was opened in 1975. In January 2024 the arenas refrigeration system suffered a major component failure. This pushed a bid for Kraft Hockeyville. Enderby was a runner up and received $25000

=== Places of interest ===
Enderby and the surrounding area is home to the world's largest reel lawnmower, built and hosted by the Deep Creek Tool Museum, and the largest drive-in movie theatre screen in North America at the Starlight Drive-In Theatre. Also located in the area is the Enderby Museum & Archives and the Kingfisher Interpretive Centre, a salmon hatchery and watershed learning centre.

== Splatsin Band ==
The Splatsin Band is the original inhabitant of the area. It is the southernmost tribe of the Secwepemc or Shuswap Nation. The Splatsin Band, occasionally anglicized as "Spallumcheen," is governed by an elected Chief and Council.

== In popular culture ==
On February 17, 2015, Miss P, a 4-year-old Beagle from Enderby, won Best in Show at the 2015 Westminster Kennel Club all-breed dog show at Madison Square Garden in New York.

== Notable people ==
- John Langdon, Royal Marine officer at D-Day, (later became an Anglican priest), was born in Enderby in 1921
