= Sicamous =

- District municipality
- District of Sicamous
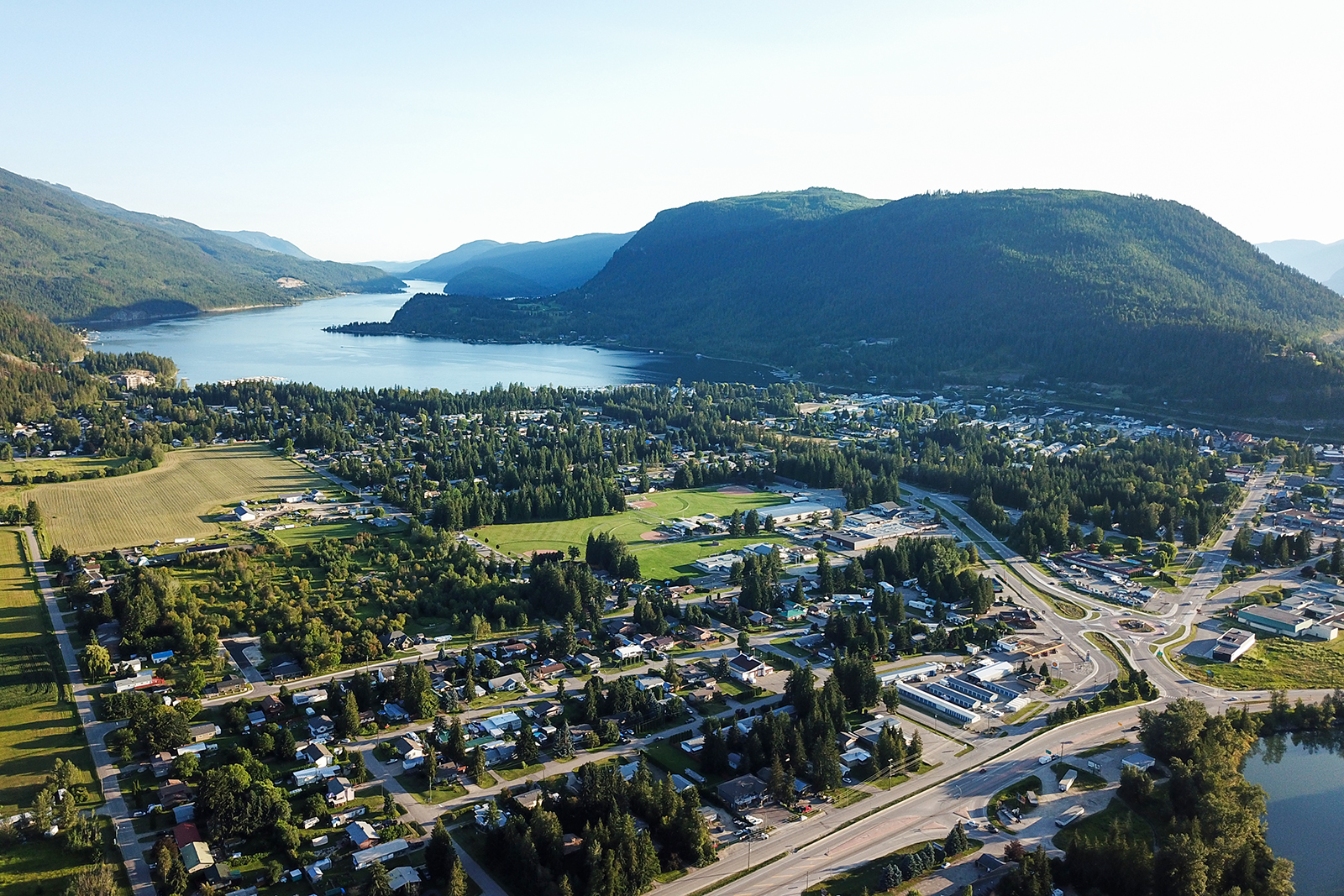
- Nickname: Siccy
- Motto: Houseboat Capital of Canada
- Location of Sicamous in British Columbia
- Coordinates: 50°50′09″N 118°58′48″W
- Country: Canada
- Province: British Columbia
- Region: Shuswap Country
- Regional district: Columbia-Shuswap
- Established: 2013

Government
  - Type: Town
  - Mayor: Gord Bushell
  - Governing body: SSDT

Area
  - Total: 12.8 km^{2} (4.9 sq mi)
- Elevation: 350.25 m (1,149.1 ft)

Population (2021)
  - Total: 2,613
  - Density: 204/km^{2} (529/sq mi)
- Time zone: UTC−07:00 (PT)
- Area codes: 250, 778, 236, & 672
- Highways: Highway 1 (TCH) & Highway 97A
- Waterways: Shuswap Lake, Mara Lake
- Website: Official website

Sicamous (/ˈsɪkəmuːs/) is a district municipality in the Shuswap Country region of south central British Columbia. The place is adjacent to the narrows, which is the confluence of Mara Lake into Shuswap Lake. At the BC Highway 97A intersection on BC Highway 1, the locality is by road about 73 kilometres (45 mi) west of Revelstoke, 140 kilometres (87 mi) east of Kamloops, and 75 kilometres (47 mi) north of Vernon.

== First Nations and fur traders ==
The Secwepemc (Shuswap) First Nations have long inhabited the shores of Shuswap and Mara lakes, evidenced by the presence of pit-houses dating back over 3,200 years. An annual potlach was held at the mouth of the Eagle River. In the 1840s, an encampment existed west of the narrows on the slopes later called CPR hill.

From the early 1820s, they brought furs to trade at the Hudson's Bay Company (HBC) fort at Kamloops. By the 1840s, an HBC outpost opened at the mouth of the Eagle River. For centuries, the river had provided an abundance of salmon, which also created a trade in dried fish. A trail on the north side of the river was used up to the 1930s to reach tracts of wild blueberry bushes.

== Name origin ==
"Schik-mouse", recorded in 1865, was the earliest known spelling of the First Nations word for Sicamous. The word describes the narrows, but the specific aspect has remained unclear. Suggestions have been "place cut through", "the narrows", "stream winding round a hill", "river circling mountains", "in the middle", and "narrow" or "squeezed in the middle". The Sicamous Channel is the only inland port in BC that does not freeze during the winter.

== Earlier general community at the Eagle River mouth ==
During the Big Bend Gold Rush of 1865, Governor Frederick Seymour commissioned Walter Moberly to identify the best route for a wagon road or railway from Shuswap Lake to the Columbia River. Although most prospectors travelled via Seymour Arm, many instead went up the Eagle River and followed First Nations trails to the Columbia. Moberly camped at the river mouth in 1865, which was soon called Eagle Pass Landing, because the river flowed from the direction of the Eagle Pass. A boom town of tents sprang up at the landing. The main buildings were an assay office, general store, blacksmith, and saloons, which were largely abandoned by the end of the following year, when the goldrush ended.

George Murdock obtained the first pre-emption in the vicinity. During 1882–1892, in partnership with Mr. Hill, he operated a hotel, store, and saloon. In 1884, the Gustavus Blin Wright syndicate completed the wagon road through the pass to Revelstoke. At the time, Murdock ran the only business at the landing. Steamboats connected to Kamloops and Savona. By the next year, during the peak of the Canadian Pacific Railway (CP) construction, more than 100 buildings lined the foreshore. The rebuild included a few hotels, stores, dance halls, livery barns, and a NWMP barracks and jail. Railway contractors Mackenzie and Mann had their headquarters at the landing. The new name was Eagle City. A stage operated to Farwell. In 1885, Fred White was appointed inaugural postmaster of the short-lived post office. The unwillingness of Mr. Bryne to sell land for a railyard east of the narrows compelled CP to build on the west side. This decision soon vacated the river mouth location, which then became known as the Old Town or Old Sicamous.

== Earlier general community west of the narrows ==
In 1884, Colonel E. Forester constructed the first building, which was the Lake View Hotel. In 1887, he built a two-storey extension which housed a store on the ground floor, was appointed postmaster, and erected a barn. The Kamloops general store owned by John Andrew Mara operated this Sicamous store as a branch.

At that time, a narrow and swampy in places wagon road was built to supersede the trail southward along the western side of Mara Lake, which connected Sicamous and Enderby. Schubert Bros. established a stage service on the route. In 1890, Wood and Tunstall purchased the J.A. Mara business.

The access point for Okanagan mail had transferred from Ducks to Sicamous, and the Schubert stage carried the mail for several years. In 1892, the Shuswap and Okanagan Railway (S&O) assumed the mail contract, the railway construction having severely damaged the Mara Lake road.

In 1894, fire destroyed the hotel and store. A few months later, the replacement hotel opened immediately south of the present highway bridge on the same site. A couple of ownership changes occurred. In 1906, the building burned to the ground. The next year, the three-storey Bellevue Hotel was opened by Leopole Congreve on the site.

In 1890, the first CP hotel was built beside the station. In 1898, a fire ignited by a dropped oil lamp in the dining room of the hotel spread to the station, destroying both properties.

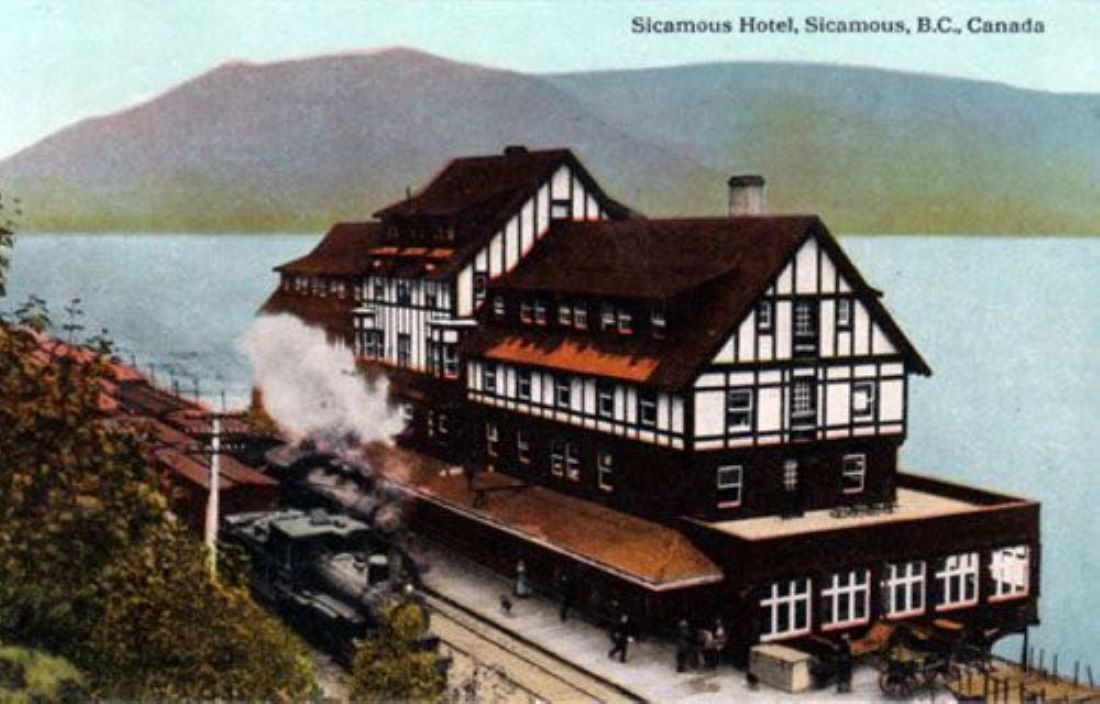
Train station/hotel, Sicamous, c.1920.

While the new 49-by-24-metre (160 by 80 ft) station/hotel was under construction, the Lake View Hotel thrived. In 1900, the new CP hotel opened. In 1908, a further storey was added. In 1914, an electrical fire caused considerable damage to the upper storey. In 1919, the lobby and main staircase at the west end were transposed with the dining room at the east end. All 75 guest rooms had hot and cold running water. Important guests included a stay by the future Edward VIII in the 1920s. CP funded a police constable based at the hotel from 1890. The jail was built on the other side of the tracks, east of the hotel in 1909.

In 1892, Mary Janet Finlayson opened a store west of the station. Two years later, the building burned down. Her next store was north of the Lake View Hotel site.

The government wharf was west of the station before relocating to the narrows in 1913, where the new 49-metre (160 ft) wharf was built. On the arrival of the government telephone line in 1914, phones were installed in the Finlayson store and two hotels.

In 1921–22, a footbridge was attached to the rail bridge.

Situated east of the CP hotel, the CP power plant provided electricity to these premises and a few houses on CPR hill. About 1929, hydro power transmission lines arrived being extended eastward across the narrows in 1949.

Great Depression relief camp workers built the Canoe–Sicamous road, which would reduce the travel distance between Salmon Arm and Sicamous by 23 kilometres (14 mi). In 1934, the road was completed to a rudimentary level. By this time, Robert (Bob) H. Congreve supplied boats and cars at his service station on the shore below the Bellevue Hotel. The upgrading of this road continued over subsequent years.

In 1956, the primary access point for rail passengers into the Okanagan switched to Salmon Arm, which offered a superior bus connection. The CP hotel at Sicamous closed that year and was demolished in 1964.

In 1957, Phil Gaglardi, minister of highways, officially opened the rebuilt Canoe–Sicamous section of highway.

== Railway ==
=== Main line ===
In August 1871, as a symbolic gesture that the railway would one day become a reality, Ed Mohun, government engineer, drove the first stake on the CP route in BC at Sicamous. In September 1885, the eastward advance of the CP rail head from Port Moody passed through Sicamous, reaching a point about 55 kilometres (34 mi) west of Revelstoke by month end. A construction camp was based at Solsqua. The Sicamous station built at that time was the standard-design (Bohi's Type 3) station building with prominent overhang (identical to Albert Canyon and Beavermouth).

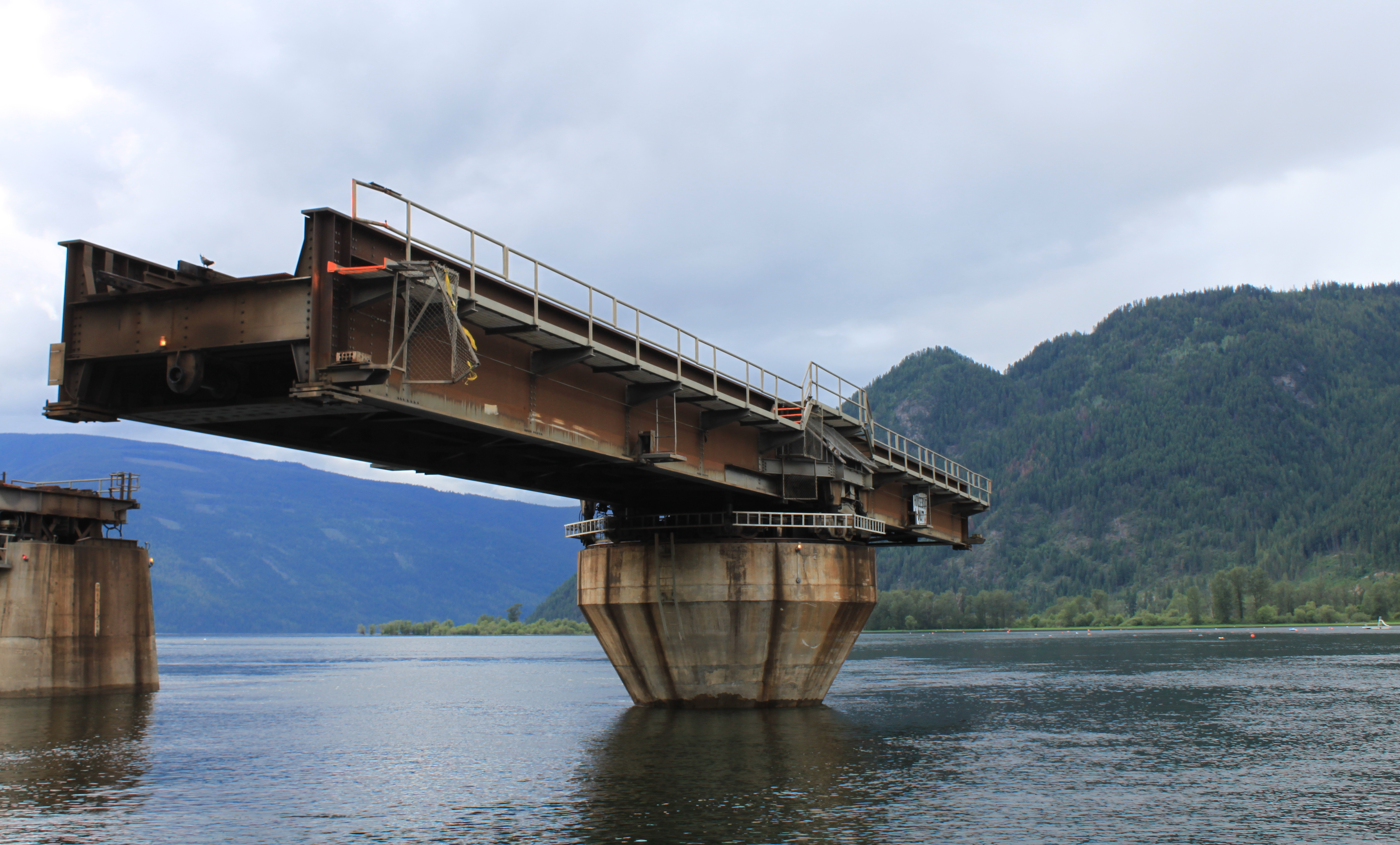
Opened railway bridge, Sicamous, 2010.

The 1885 timber pile trestle rail bridge had a wooden drawbridge for river traffic, which was replaced in 1898 by a manually turned swing span. In 1913, three 20-metre (65 ft) and one 16-metre (54 ft) steel spans replaced timber trestles. In 1982, a double track swing bridge, comprising five 23-metre (75 ft) spans plus a 48-metre (157 ft) swing span, was erected 2 metres (7 ft) higher than the former single track structure, adjacent to its north.

During World War I, a military camp was established to house soldiers guarding the rail bridge. In 1939, when the westbound royal train made a 10-minute stop, King George VI and Queen Elizabeth came out onto the rear observation platform of their car and the king chatted with the children who filed by in an orderly procession. In 1951, the westbound royal train carrying Princess Elizabeth and Prince Philip made a stop, where the royal couple alighted, greeted the crowd at Finlayson Park for over 10 minutes, reboarded, and waved from the observation platform. In 1959, the westbound royal train carrying the Queen and Prince Philip made a 20-minute stop, which comprised a similar program to the previous visit. The train stopped overnight opposite the station, entering the branch line the next day.

=== Branch ===
In May 1891, the southward advance of the S&O rail head from Sicamous passed through Enderby. Before the 25-year lease of the line ended in 1915, CP purchased the remaining shares in the S&O. The Okanagan Valley Railway leased the former S&O trackage 1998–2009.

== Ferry and road bridges over the narrows ==
Established in 1933, the subsidised ferry was operated by Bob Congreve throughout its existence. Described as two riverboats about 9-metre (30 ft) long, 6-metre (20 ft) apart, straddled by a railed platform, the former Squilax reaction ferry was manoeuvred by either an outboard or his power-boat. The season was May to the end of December. The hours were 7am–10pm and the fare was 50 cents per car.

In 1942, a new four-car ferry was installed. That year, the ferry became free, but a charge was made for after hours service. A different account states a 24-hour service operated until 1942, when it became 7am–8pm six days a week. The fare was one-way for visitors but return for locals.

The ferry operated until a trestle bridge opened in June 1949. Built by the Salmon Arm Bridge crew, the structure was 174 metres (570 ft) long with a 21-metre (70 ft) steel girder main span. The wooden crossing was south of the Bellevue Hotel, connecting with the old highway (Finlayson St). In 1957, the bridge was redecked.

Contracts awarded in 1961 for the new bridge were the substructure to Vega Construction ($197,775) and the superstructure to Canada Iron Foundries ($335,504). The 11-by-242-metre (37 by 795 ft) two-lane crossing with a sidewalk stood 9 metres (30 ft) above high water. Originally named the Sicamous Narrows Bridge on completion in 1962, the crossing was renamed the RW Bruhn Bridge the following year. In 1964, the former bridge was dismantled.

Work on a four-lane replacement, which started in 2023, is expected for completion in 2026 but demolition of the old bridge could extend the project into 2027.

== Forestry ==
In 1902, the province incorporated the Shuswap Shingle and Lumber Co. to acquire certain lumber businesses that James C. Shields owned, which included the shingle mill 7 kilometres (4.5 mi) west at Annis. James remained as manager. By 1904, the operation was part of the Kamloops Lumber Company, which included large sawmills at Kamloops and Enderby.

By 1906, James had left the Annis mill to pursue lumber interests at Savona. The Annis venture appears to have closed by this time, and a conversion to a sawmill took place from 1907 to 1909, when it emerged as Shields' Sovereign Mill. The business existed into the 1910s.

In 1920, Sicamous Sawmills was incorporated with a capital of $100,000. That year, Rolf Wallgren Bruhn owned the first house on CPR hill, where his lumber head office was also located. The corporation had a tie loading facility at Sicamous and a pole yard south at Mara Point. The company workshop was some distance west of the Sicamous station. In the late 1930s, he established a sawmill on the Old Town shore, which was expanded in 1942 but closed in 1949. Mr. Van Schmidt had a shingle mill in this vicinity in the early 1940s. On the east shore south at Two Mile, Ross Graham operated a sawmill for about a decade before burning down in 1949.

On the liquidation of the Bruhn assets in 1949, Federated Co-op purchased the logging and sawmill interests and B.J. Carney the post, pole, and tie ones. Initially, Carney maintained a branch office at Sicamous, but in 1966, he established a big yard for post-peeling activities. By 1973, all his peeling was centralized at Sicamous. In 1990, his Enderby office closed to consolidate at Sicamous.

During 1941–1982, a Forestry Service office existed.

== Earlier general community east of the narrows ==
The wagon road along the western side of Mara Lake having been destroyed, interned aliens built sections of a new road along the eastern side from June 1915 to July 1917. However, a 4-kilometre (2.5 mi) gap to Sicamous existed for several years.

In 1915, the Sicamous–Solsqua road east was rebuilt. About this time George Dillabough established a boat livery, to which he added a general store.

The highway link east to Revelstoke, which had been destroyed by the railway construction in the 1880s, was not restored until 1922. At the end of the prior year, the link south to Mara was completed. In 1926, the community hall was built. In 1927, Roy Finlayson opened the first garage and installed an Esso pump. Sold in 1958, the premises were demolished in the early 1970s.

In 1945, the local branch of the Legion was established. In 1947, Douglas Finlayson relocated the family store from the west side of the narrows. Sold in 1957, the store burned to the ground in 1982. In the late 1940s, Bell's tourist cabins were erected, and the Greyhound bus stopped at the Tordoff tea room. The next year, the installation of the town water supply was completed. In 1964, Sicamous Water District assumed ownership.

After the absence of a police presence in the vicinity for a few years, a police post was established in 1952. That year, the volunteer fire department was created. The Eagle River Credit Union was founded in 1953, opened its first building in 1958, and merged with the Salmon Arm Savings and Credit Union in 1975. In 1954 the Jehovah's Witnesses opened their hall. On completion of a new Kingdom hall in 1983, the old building was sold. In 1955, St Peter's Anglican church building opened, and the post office moved from a general store to a separate building, which was enlarged in 1973 and replaced in 1982. In 1956, Our Lady of Fatima Roman Catholic building was completed, and a Bank of Montreal (BMO) branch opened, moving to the post office building the following year. In 1982, the Catholic church hall opened. A volunteer ambulance service commenced in 1957, was run by the Kinsmen from 1963, and was taken over by the province in 1974.

Partially destroyed by fire in the 1950s, the community hall was extended during a rehabilitation. Various uses included Legion hall, boat storage, movie house, second hand store, and flea market. Known as the Red Barn by the 1980s, the premises have continued to be used for social events. The place is now called the Red Barn Arts Centre. In 1958, the Eagle Valley News was founded, and the Lazy Daze Marina Motel & Campground was established (later known as Bluewater Houseboat). The next year, the new Legion hall opened.

Built in 1960 were the Monashee Motel and the 20.8-kilometre (12.9 mi) Sicamous–Malakwa reconstruction. The Paradise Motel came in 1962. Opened in 1963 were the United church building and the Husky service station/restaurant, which was designed as a rest stop for long haul trucking.

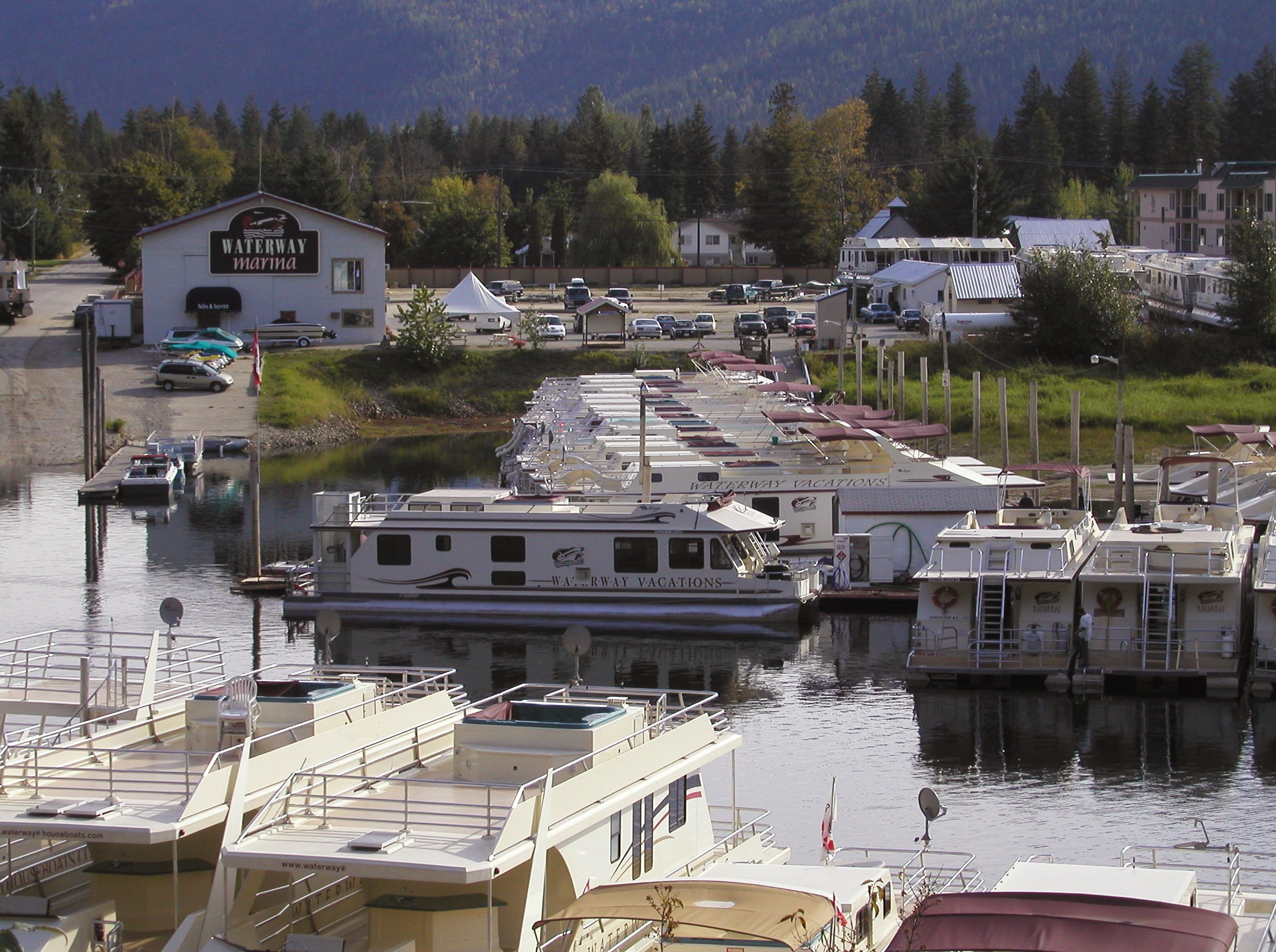
Houseboats in the narrows, Sicamous, 2003.

The title of "houseboat capital of Canada" first appeared in a 1969 magazine and a 1970 newspaper.

In 1971, an explosion destroyed the Sicamous Marina, an adjacent home, boats, motors, snowmobiles, and other sporting goods. In 1972, about 25 families fled to higher ground when up to 1 metre (3 ft) of water surged through the downtown area from the rain-swollen Shuswap and Mara lakes. In 1974, the first bowling alley opened.

Caesars Inn was established in 1975, sold in 1979, burned down in 1993, relocated, and renamed Brothers Tavern & Liquor Store. In 1977, the Sicamous–Enderby highway was paved. Opened in 1978 were a 7-by-46-metre (24 by 150 ft) timber pile landing, a new firehall, a new telephone exchange, and the Parklands Mall. The first RBC was located at the latter in the early 1980s.

In 1980, a library branch was established. Acquired in 1981, the Silver Sands beach property was developed as a public facility. In 1983, the Sicamous and District Recreation Centre opened.

The District of Sicamous was incorporated in December 1989.

The waterfront enhancement project officially opened in 1992.

== Schools ==
In 1910, the one-room Sicamous school, which opened on leased land near the creek up on CPR hill, lacked any road access. In 1946, the school closed due to insufficient student numbers.

In 1921, the one-room Eagle Valley school was established in the vicinity of the present Eagle River Secondary. In 1946, the school became part of the new School District 20 Salmon Arm. During the summer break, lumber donated by the Bruhn mill, and from demolishing the closed Sicamous school, was used to build an extension at Eagle Valley to create a second classroom.

In 1950, Eagle River school was the rebranded name. That year, grades 1 and 2 were bussed in from Solsqua and grades 6 and 7 were bussed out. On the completion of a new three-room school in 1951, all Solsqua pupils were bussed in, as were Malakwa pupils above grade 6. The final year at Eagle River increased over time from grade 10 to grade 12. When the student population grew, the two former classrooms were again used, as were two upstairs rooms in the then firehall. In 1955–56, four new classrooms, an auditorium, and kitchen were built.

After Parkview Elementary opened in 1970, grades K–7 gradually moved from Eagle River school. In 1966–67, three new offices and an auditorium/cafeteria were built at Eagle River. The old auditorium was converted to two science rooms and a bookroom. In 1967, the old Eagle Valley building was moved to Finlayson Park. In 1968, the final grade 12 graduation was held. Over the following years, grades 11 and 12 were bussed to Salmon Arm Secondary. That year, the school became part of School District 89 Shuswap.

In 1975, two arsonists destroyed the Eagle River north wing. In 1977, the rebuild was complete. The next year, the name changed from Eagle River Elem-High to Eagle River Secondary. After grades 11 and 12 were restored, 1979 was the first graduation.

In 1969, 1.6 hectares (4 acres) of land was purchased for a primary school adjacent to the park. In 1970, the school district maintenance staff built the new two-room building. That September, Parkview Elementary opened. The next year, two more classrooms were added. A gym and four more rooms were erected in 1974, and seven more over the next four years. In 1983, six new rooms replaced portables.

In 1996, the Sicamous schools became part of the new School District 83 North Okanagan-Shuswap. In the 2020s, classes continue at Eagle River Secondary and Parkview Elementary.

== Notable people ==
- George Abbott, (1952– ), politician, place of birth and resident.
- Kris Beech, (1981– ), ice hockey player, resident.
- Rob Flockhart, (1956–2021), ice hockey player, resident.
- Ron Flockhart, (1960– ), ice hockey player, resident.
- Cody Franson, (1987– ), ice hockey player, place of birth.
- Colin Fraser, (1985– ), ice hockey player, place of birth.
- Andrew Kozek, (1986– ), ice hockey player, resident.
- Greg Kyllo, (1968– ), politician, resident.
- Carolyn Mark, (19??– ), singer-songwriter, resident.
- Dale Purinton, (1976– ), ice hockey player, resident.
- Shea Weber, (1985– ), ice hockey player, place of birth and resident.

== Later community ==
Growth has depended upon the resort industry and the state of the energy sector in Alberta (30 per cent of occupancy being seasonal). A houseboat manufacturing industry exists and rental stock totals about 250 units.

The town includes infrastructure typical for its size. The stores, restaurants, museum, library, trails, parks, beaches, and boating, cater to leisure activities. Emergency services bases exist for police, fire, and ambulance.

In 1983 the Sicamous and District Recreation Centre was opened costing a total of $810,000. Prior to 1983 there was no arena in the town.

In 2012, flash floods prompted the evacuation of around 350 people south at Two Mile and Swansea Point.

Prior to Greyhound ceasing all intraprovincial routes in 2018, an application the prior year included a service reduction via Sicamous. Rider Express provides a daily bus service.

During 2018 and 2019, the country music hit Old Town Road caused fans to steal the unrelated Old Town Road street signs. Consequently, the Sicamous and District Chamber of Commerce produced replicas for sale at $25 each.

In 2019, the Sicamous council reversed its decision to rename the Sicamous and District Recreation Centre as the March Memorial Arena.

In 2022, the scope of the District of Sicamous boundary expansion study was reduced when Swansea Point and Mara Hills were excluded.

In 2023, the district bio-fuel facility was completed.

In 2024, the town opened a Pump track in Finlayson Park and was home to the UCI World Championships Canada Qualifier in 2024 and 2025.

== Maps ==
Census population: Sicamous
Year	Pop.	±%
1951	371	—
1961		—
1971	814	—
1976	809	−0.6%
1981		—
1986*	2,428	—
1991	2,501	+3.0%
1996	2,827	+13.0%
2001	2,720	−3.8%
2006	2,676	−1.6%
2011	2,441	−8.8%
2016	2,429	−0.5%
2021	2,613	+7.6%
Source: 1951; Statistics Canada * Revised figure

- "Shuswap sheet map". geography.ua.edu. 1898.
- "Rand McNally BC map". www.davidrumsey.com. 1925.
- "Standard Oil BC map". www.davidrumsey.com. 1937.
- "Shell BC map". www.davidrumsey.com. 1956. Archived from the original on 2022-10-17.
- "Explore Sicamous Trail Maps". exploresicamous.ca. 2025.
- "District of Sicamous Map Hub". sicamous.ca. 2025.

== Demographics ==
In the 2021 Census of Population conducted by Statistics Canada, Sicamous had a population of 2,613 living in 1,244 of its 1,905 total private dwellings, a change of 7.6% from its 2016 population of 2,429. With a land area of 12.8 km^{2} (4.9 sq mi), it had a population density of 204.1/km^{2} (528.7/sq mi) in 2021.

According to the 2021 census, religious groups in Sicamous included:

- Irreligion (1,605 persons or 61.0%)
- Christianity (995 persons or 37.8%)
  - Catholic (190 persons or 7.2%)
  - Anglican (140 persons or 5.3%)
  - United Church (135 persons or 5.1%)
  - Lutheran (55 persons or 2.1%)
  - Baptist (50 persons or 1.9%)
  - Pentecostal (50 persons or 1.9%)
  - Other Christian (375 persons or 14.3%)
- Other (10 persons or 0.4%)
