= Eric Foster (politician) =

Canadian politician (born 1949)

Member of the British Columbia Legislative Assembly for Vernon-Monashee
- In office May 12, 2009 – September 21, 2020
- Preceded by: Tom Christensen
- Succeeded by: Harwinder Sandhu

Mayor of Lumby
- In office 2002–2009
- Preceded by: Joanne Kineshenko
- Succeeded by: Kevin Acton

Personal details
- Born: 1949 (age 76–77)
- Party: BC Liberal
- Spouse: Janice
- Occupation: Forestry technician, instructor

Eric Bailey Foster (born 1949) was a Member of the Legislative Assembly of British Columbia, Canada, serving as a member of the BC Liberal Party. He was elected to the Legislative Assembly from the riding of Vernon-Monashee in the 2009 provincial election. In the 39th Parliament of British Columbia, Foster was not named to Premier Gordon Campbell's cabinet, but he was appointed deputy whip. As a member of the Select Standing Committee on Legislative Initiatives which he voted to initiate province-wide referendum concerning the Harmonized Sales Tax. He was also a member of the Special Committee to Review the Freedom of Information and Protection of Privacy Act, and the Select Standing Committee on Parliamentary Reform, Ethical Conduct, Standing Orders and Private Bills. Prior to his involvement with provincial politics, Foster served 12 years as municipal councillor and 3 years as mayor of Lumby, British Columbia.

== Background ==
Originally from Dartmouth, Nova Scotia, Eric Foster moved to British Columbia and worked in the forestry industry. With his wife and son, Foster moved to Lumby, from Vernon, working at a Lumby lumber mill. In the 1990s he became an educational assistant helping to develop the forestry program at Charles Bloom Secondary School. He became a municipal councilor in Lumby in 1990 and was re-elected until 2002 when he ran for mayor but lost. He filed his nomination papers to run for mayor again in 2005 but, with no other person being nominated, he was acclaimed mayor. At the time, he noted downtown revitalization and building a road to connect the village with Silver Star Mountain resort as priorities. He represented Lumby on the Regional District of North Okanagan board of directors during his tenure as mayor. He fought the School Board who tried to close Charles Bloom Secondary School, in favour of busing student to the expanded secondary school in Vernon, as well as fought the proposed closure of Whitevale Elementary in rural Lumby. He resented what he saw as provincial downloading of responsibilities, like riparian area regulations and police funding. He supported Lumby participating in a new Regional District economic development function, but opted out of a Regional District emergency service function (opting to contract the service out to the City of Vernon). In 2008, he was again acclaimed as mayor, as no one else sought the position. In January 2009 he was acclaimed chair of the Regional District board of directors, however, as MLA Tom Christensen announced his retirement in the same month, Foster announced his intention to seek the BC Liberal nomination in up-coming provincial election.

== Provincial politics ==
In nomination election was held in March and with over 800 BC Liberal Party members voting, Foster defeated four other candidates: Lumby councilor Deb Leroux, morning radio host Betty Selin, Coldstream businessman Michael Tindall, and lawyer Andrew Powell. He took a leave of absence from his job as mayor to campaign for the provincial election where he faced school-bus driver Mark Olsen for the New Democratic Party, computer analyst Huguette Allen for the BC Green Party, salesman Dean Skoreyko for the BC Conservative Party, retired Coldstream resident RJ Busch for the BC Refederation Party, and Armstrong butcher Gordon Campbell (non-affiliated). Premier and BC Liberal Party leader Gordon Campbell campaigned with Foster in Vernon but was involved in what was perceived as an offense joke at the expense of striking paramedics. Foster won the riding, with his BC Liberals winning all Okanagan-Shuswap ridings. The BC Liberals were re-elected to form another majority government. Beginning the 39th Parliament, Premier Campbell did not include Foster in his cabinet but he was named deputy whip for the Liberal caucus. Foster was also a member of the Select Standing Committee on Parliamentary Reform, Ethical Conduct, Standing Orders and Private Bills in the first two sessions, and which met only once in each session. Foster was a member of the Special Committee to Review the Freedom of Information and Protection of Privacy Act which presented its report and recommendations in May 2010.

Foster developed a feud with Nelson-Creston MLA Michelle Mungall who accused Foster of deceiving voters and of speaking very little in the legislature. He defended the introduction of the Harmonized Sales Tax but became a target for recall when an Anti-HST petition gathered more signature in the Vernon-Monashee riding than votes that elected him. He was member of the Select Standing Committee on Legislative Initiatives which was forced to deal with the Anti-HST petition. Along party lines, Foster and the BC Liberals in favour of initiating a province-wide referendum. Foster was among 13 BC Liberals left out during a late-October cabinet (and parliamentary secretary) shuffle by Premier Campbell. During the BC Liberal leadership election, following the resignation of Campbell, Foster endorsed George Abbott citing his profile as an Interior MLA, his team-building skills, and analytical decision-making. Christy Clark eventually won and, thus, became premier. She kept Foster as the deputy whip until September 2012 when he was promoted to government whip.

Meanwhile, as the FightHST group continued to investigate a recall campaign against Foster, he accused the group of trying to "overthrow the government". On local issues, Foster lobbied in favour of locating a new regional correctional facility in Lumby, building a large new sports facility at Okanagan College, and was in favour of resolving overcrowding at the Vernon Jubilee Hospital.

When the Liberal Party formed the Official Opposition, Foster continued to serve as the party's Whip.

== Election history ==
2020 British Columbia general election: Vernon-Monashee
Party	Candidate	Votes	%	±%	Expenditures
New Democratic	Harwinder Sandhu	10,222	36.56	+7.20	$4,746.98
Liberal	Eric Foster	9,798	35.05	−12.82	$30,325.57
Green	Keli Westgate	4,464	15.97	−5.60	$9,375.32
Conservative	Kyle Delfing	3,472	12.42	–	$0.00
Total valid votes		27,956	100.00	–	
Total rejected ballots		96	0.34	–0.03	
Turnout		28,052	52.76	–6.20	
Registered voters		53,169			
New Democratic gain from Liberal		Swing		+10.01	
Source: Elections BC

2017 British Columbia general election: Vernon-Monashee
Party	Candidate	Votes	%	±%	Expenditures
Liberal	Eric Foster	13,625	47.87	+1.53	$64,366
New Democratic	Barry Charles Dorval	8,355	29.36	−4.86	$22,788
Green	Keli Westgate	6,139	21.57	+14.51	$4,848
Libertarian	Don Jefcoat	341	1.20	–	$468
Total valid votes		28,460	100.00	–	
Total rejected ballots		105	0.37	+0.09	
Turnout		28,565	58.96	+1.55	
Registered voters		48,444			
Source: Elections BC

2013 British Columbia general election: Vernon-Monashee
Party	Candidate	Votes	%
Liberal	Eric Bailey Foster	12,503	46.34
New Democratic	Mark Steven Olsen	9,233	34.22
Conservative	Scott Anderson	3,169	11.75
Green	Rebecca Helps	1,905	7.06
Independent	Korry Zepik	169	0.63
Total valid votes		26,979	100.00
Total rejected ballots		77	0.28
Turnout		27,056	57.41
Source: Elections BC

B.C. General Election 2009: Vernon-Monashee
Party	Candidate	Votes	%	±	Expenditures
Liberal	Eric Foster	9,015	37%	n/a	$89,935
NDP	Mark Olsen	7,698	32%	n/a	$42,427
Green	Huguette Allen	4,029	17%	n/a	$18,783
Conservative	Dean Skoreyko	1,972	8%	n/a	$5,617
Non-affiliated	Gordon Campbell	1,397	6%	n/a	$250
Refederation	R.J. Busch	76	0.3%	n/a	$260
Total Valid Votes		24,187	100%		
Total Rejected Ballots		213	0.9%		
Turnout		24,400	54%		
