= Clarence Fulton Secondary School =

Clarence Fulton Secondary

Location
- 2301 Fulton Rd PO Box 2301; Vernon, British Columbia, V1H 1Y1; Canada; 50.2494°N 119.3093°W

Information
- Former names: Vernon High School, Clarence Fulton High School
- School type: Public, high school
- Motto: Felicitas et Dignitas (Success and Prestige)
- Founded: 1964
- School board: School District 22 Vernon
- Superintendent: Karla Mitchell
- School number: 2222025
- Principal: Melissa Yurkowski
- Staff: 55
- Grades: 8-12
- Enrollment: 788 (2025/2026)
- Language: English
- Colours: Gold, maroon
- Team name: Maroons
- Website: clarencefulton.sd22.bc.ca
- Last updated: October 3, 2026

Clarence Fulton Secondary is a public high school in Vernon, British Columbia part of School District 22 Vernon. The school was originally called Vernon High School and was located at the north end of Polson Park in 1937, though it was renamed Vernon High School in 1964 after Clarence Fulton, former principal of several Vernon schools. In 1983, the school became a full secondary school and gained its current name. In 1993, the school moved to its current location.

The former school site is now the location of the Okanagan Science Centre.

== Notable alumni ==
- James Green, CFL player
