= Vernon-Lumby =

Provincial electoral district in British Columbia, Canada

British Columbia electoral district
- Interactive map of riding boundaries

Provincial electoral district
- Legislature: Legislative Assembly of British Columbia
MLA
Kevin Acton
Conservative
- District created: 1988
- First contested: 1991
- Last contested: 2026

Demographics
- Population (2021): 57,423
- Area (km²): 1,265
- Pop. density (per km²): 45.4
- Census division: Regional District of North Okanagan
- Census subdivision(s): Vernon, Lumby

Vernon-Lumby (formerly Okanagan-Vernon and Vernon-Monashee) is a provincial electoral district in British Columbia that has been represented in the Legislative Assembly since 1991.

The riding was established in 1988 and was first contested in the 1991 general election. Following the results of the 2021 electoral redistribution, the riding's name was changed and its boundaries were adjusted ahead of the 2024 general election.

== Demographics ==
Population, 2021	57,423
Area (km^{2})	1,265
Population density (people per km^{2})	45

== Geography ==
As of the 2024 provincial election, Vernon-Lumby comprises the southwestern portion of the Regional District of North Okanagan in southern British Columbia. Communities in the electoral district are Vernon and Lumby.

== Members of the Legislative Assembly ==
This riding has elected the following members of the Legislative Assembly:

Assembly	Years	Member	Party
Okanagan-Vernon; Riding created from Boundary-Similkameen, Okanagan North and Okanagan South
35th	1991–1994	Lyall Hanson	Social Credit
35th	1994–1996	Lyall Hanson	Reform
36th	1996–2001	April Sanders	Liberal
37th	2001–2005	Tom Christensen	Liberal
38th	2005–2009	Tom Christensen	Liberal
Vernon-Monashee
39th	2009–2013	Eric Foster	Liberal
40th	2013–2017	Eric Foster	Liberal
41st	2017–2020	Eric Foster	Liberal
42nd	2020–2024	Harwinder Sandhu	New Democratic
Vernon-Lumby
43rd	2024–2026	Harwinder Sandhu	New Democratic
44th	2026–present	Kevin Acton	Conservative

== Election results ==
2026 British Columbia general election
Party	Candidate	Votes	%	±%	Expenditures
Conservative	Kevin Acton	12,700	50.8%	+35.4	
New Democratic	Harwinder Sandhu	9,447	37.8%	-4.9	
Green	Blair Visscher	1,724	6.9%		
OneBC	Chantel Gibbs	1,120	4.5%		
Total valid votes		24,992			
Total rejected ballots		33			
Turnout					
Registered voters					
Source: Elections BC

2024 British Columbia general election
Party	Candidate	Votes	%	±%	Expenditures
New Democratic	Harwinder Sandhu	11,837	42.7%	+6.0	
Conservative	Dennis Giesbrecht	11,361	41.0%	+28.0	
Unaffiliated	Kevin Acton	4,266	15.4%		
Libertarian	Robert Johnson	265	1.0%		
Total valid votes		27,729	–		
Total rejected ballots					
Turnout					
Registered voters					
Source: Elections BC

2020 provincial election redistributed results
Party	%
New Democratic	36.7
Liberal	34.2
Green	16.1
Conservative	13.0

2020 British Columbia general election: Vernon-Monashee
Party	Candidate	Votes	%	±%	Expenditures
New Democratic	Harwinder Sandhu	10,222	36.56	+7.20	$4,746.98
Liberal	Eric Foster	9,798	35.05	−12.82	$30,325.57
Green	Keli Westgate	4,464	15.97	−5.60	$9,375.32
Conservative	Kyle Delfing	3,472	12.42	–	$0.00
Total valid votes		27,956	100.00	–	
Total rejected ballots		96	0.34	–0.03	
Turnout		28,052	52.76	–6.20	
Registered voters		53,169			
New Democratic gain from Liberal		Swing		+10.01	
Source: Elections BC

2017 British Columbia general election: Vernon-Monashee
Party	Candidate	Votes	%	±%	Expenditures
Liberal	Eric Foster	13,625	47.87	+1.53	$64,366
New Democratic	Barry Charles Dorval	8,355	29.36	−4.86	$22,788
Green	Keli Westgate	6,139	21.57	+14.51	$4,848
Libertarian	Don Jefcoat	341	1.20	–	$468
Total valid votes		28,460	100.00	–	
Total rejected ballots		105	0.37	+0.09	
Turnout		28,565	58.96	+1.55	
Registered voters		48,444			
Source: Elections BC

2013 British Columbia general election: Vernon-Monashee
Party	Candidate	Votes	%
Liberal	Eric Bailey Foster	12,503	46.34
New Democratic	Mark Steven Olsen	9,233	34.22
Conservative	Scott Anderson	3,169	11.75
Green	Rebecca Helps	1,905	7.06
Independent	Korry Zepik	169	0.63
Total valid votes		26,979	100.00
Total rejected ballots		77	0.28
Turnout		27,056	57.41
Source: Elections BC

BC General Election 2009: Vernon-Monashee
Party	Candidate	Votes	%	±	Expenditures
Liberal	Eric Foster	9,015	37.27	n/a	$89,935
NDP	Mark Olsen	7,698	31.83	n/a	$42,427
Green	Huguette Allen	4,029	16.66	n/a	$18,783
Conservative	Dean Skoreyko	1,972	8.15	n/a	$5,617
Non-affiliated	Gordon Campbell	1,397	5.78	n/a	$250
Refederation	R.J. Busch	76	0.31	n/a	$260
Total valid votes		24,187	100.00		
Total rejected ballots		213	0.9%		
Turnout		24,400	54%		

BC General Election 2005 Okanagan-Vernon
Party	Candidate	Votes	%	±	Expenditures
Liberal	Tom Christensen	11,566	43.20%	–	$91,684
NDP	Juliette Marie Cunningham	8,995	33.59%		$24,514
Conservative	Colin Black	3,095	11.56%		$9,633
Green	Erin Nelson	1,867	6.97%	–	$356
No Affiliation	Gordon Campbell	945	3.53%		$100
Marijuana	Michael Toponce	260	0.97%		$100
Patriot	Tibor Lesley Tusnady	48	0.18%	–	$100
Total valid votes		26,776	100%		
Total rejected ballots		307	1.15%		
Turnout		27,083	61.10%		

BC General Election 2001: Okanagan-Vernon
Party	Candidate	Votes	%	±	Expenditures
Liberal	Tom Christensen	13,868	56.51%	–	$39,988
NDP	Troy Sebastian	3,529	14.38%		$12,122
Unity	Doug MacDonald	3,213	13.09%	–	$9,001
Green	Erin Nelson	2,214	9.02%	–	$409
Marijuana	Michael Jones	917	3.74%		$403
Independent	Herb Wong	562	2.29%		$1,061
Independent	Kathleen (N.O.) Daniels	157	0.64%		$100
Patriot	Andrew N. Hokhold	82	0.33%	–	$100
Total valid votes		24,542	100.00%		
Total rejected ballots		68	0.28%		
Turnout		24,610	69.06%		

BC General Election 1996: Okanagan-Vernon
Party	Candidate	Votes	%	±	Expenditures
Liberal	April Sanders	9,776	39.06%	–	$41,378
NDP	Howard Brown	7,497	29.95%	–	$18,338
Reform	Heinz Weiss	5,356	21.40%	–	$30,326
Progressive Democrat	Geoff Jell	1,839	7.35%	–	$5,768
Green	Jane Peach	334	1.33%	–	$100
Social Credit	Clinton Henry	227	0.91%	–	$8,350
Total valid votes		25,029	100.00%		
Total rejected ballots		82	0.33%		
Turnout		25,111	71.03%		

BC General Election 1991: Okanagan-Vernon
Party	Candidate	Votes	%	±	Expenditures
Social Credit	Lyall Hanson	8,615	37.99%	–	$32,016
NDP	Gilles De Chantal	7,720	34.05%		$33,069
Liberal	Ernst Juli	6,065	26.75%	–	$4,672
Independent	Kathleen (N.O.) Daniels	275	1.21%		$56
Total valid votes		22,675	100.00%		
Total rejected ballots		401	1.74%		
Turnout		23,076	76.06%		

== See also ==
- List of British Columbia provincial electoral districts
- Canadian provincial electoral districts
