= Tom Christensen (politician) =

Canadian politician and lawyer

Member of the British Columbia Legislative Assembly for Okanagan-Vernon
- In office May 16, 2001 – May 12, 2009
- Preceded by: April Sanders
- Succeeded by: Eric Foster

Minister of Education of British Columbia
- In office January 26, 2004 – June 16, 2005
- Premier: Gordon Campbell
- Preceded by: Christy Clark
- Succeeded by: Shirley Bond

Minister of Aboriginal Relations and Reconciliation of British Columbia
- In office June 16, 2005 – August 15, 2006
- Premier: Gordon Campbell
- Preceded by: Geoff Plant (Treaty Negotiations); Murray Coell (Community, Aboriginal and Women’s Services)
- Succeeded by: Michael de Jong

Minister of Children and Family Development of British Columbia
- In office August 15, 2006 – June 10, 2009
- Premier: Gordon Campbell
- Preceded by: Stan Hagen
- Succeeded by: Mary Polak

Personal details
- Born: 1966 (age 59–60) Vernon, British Columbia
- Party: BC Liberal
- Education: University of Victoria
- Profession: lawyer

Tom Christensen (born 1966) is a Canadian lawyer and former politician. He was a member of the Legislative Assembly (MLA) of British Columbia, representing the electoral district of Okanagan-Vernon from 2001 to 2009. A caucus member of the British Columbia Liberal Party, he served in several cabinet posts under Premier Gordon Campbell.

== Biography ==
Born in Vernon, British Columbia, he attended the University of Victoria, graduating with a bachelor of arts degree in geography and environmental studies in 1990, and a law degree in 1994. He was called to the British Columbia bar in 1995 and practised at Davidson & Company, becoming partner in 1999.

He ran as a candidate for the British Columbia Liberal Party in the 2001 provincial election, and was elected Member of the Legislative Assembly for Okanagan-Vernon. He was appointed to the cabinet in January 2004 to serve as Minister of Education.

After being returned in the 2005 election with a margin of 2,571 votes, he was named Minister of Aboriginal Relations and Reconciliation. He was subsequently re-assigned as Minister of Children and Family Development in August 2006 as part of a cabinet shuffle. He did not seek re-election in 2009.
