= Telus World Skins Game =

Golf tournament

Tournament information
- Location: Rotates: Halifax, Nova Scotia, Canada (in 2012)
- Established: 1993
- Course: Rotates: Glen Arbour Golf Course (in 2012)
- Format: Skins game
- Prize fund: $360,000
- Month played: July
- Final year: 2012

Final champion
- (England) Paul Casey

The Telus Skins Game was a Canadian annual summer golf event, sponsored by Telus, and officially known as the Telus World Skins Game. It was hosted at a different golf course each year within Canada.

Between 2006 and 2012, the Telus Skins Game incorporated a "world" theme, which incorporated five golfers from different countries.

In May 2013, it was announced that the Skins Game would not be played after Telus decided not to renew its deal as title sponsor.

== History ==
2012 Glen Arbour Golf Course, Halifax, Nova Scotia

Position	Player	Skins	Money ($)
Winner	(England) Paul Casey	8	185,000
Runner-up	(Venezuela) Jhonattan Vegas	5	85,000
Third	(Sweden) Carl Pettersson	3	60,000
T4	(Canada) Stephen Ames	1	15,000
T4	(United States) Lucas Glover	1	15,000

2011 Banff Springs Golf Course, Banff, Alberta

Position	Player	Skins	Money ($)
Winner	(Venezuela) Jhonattan Vegas	7	140,000
Runner-up	(United States) Lucas Glover	5	125,000
Third	(Canada) Stephen Ames	3	45,000
Fourth	(United States) Anthony Kim	2	30,000
Fifth	(England) Paul Casey	1	20,000

2010 Bear Mountain Resort, Victoria, British Columbia

Position	Player	Skins	Money ($)
Winner	(Canada) Mike Weir	12	270,000
Runner-up	(South Africa) Retief Goosen	5	75,000
Third	(England) Ian Poulter	1	15,000
T4	(Colombia) Camilo Villegas	0	0
T4	(United States) Fred Couples	0	0

2009 La Tempête Golf Club, Lévis, Quebec

Position	Player	Skins	Money ($)
Winner	(Australia) Geoff Ogilvy	7	150,000
Runner-up	(United States) Fred Couples	4	65,000
Third	(Spain) Sergio García	3	45,000
T4	(England) Ian Poulter	2	50,000
T4	(Canada) Mike Weir	2	50,000

2008 Predator Ridge Resort, Vernon, British Columbia

Position	Player	Skins	Money ($)
Winner	(Colombia) Camilo Villegas	10	230,000
Runner-up	(Australia) Greg Norman	6	100,000
Third	(United States) Fred Couples	2	30,000
T4	(Scotland) Colin Montgomerie	0	0
T4	(Canada) Mike Weir	0	0

2007 The Raven Golf Club at Lora Bay, The Blue Mountains, Ontario

Position	Player	Skins	Money ($)
Winner	(United States) John Daly	12	220,000
Runner-up	(Australia) Geoff Ogilvy	5	125,000
Third	(Canada) Stephen Ames	1	15,000
T4	(South Africa) Retief Goosen	0	0
T4	(Scotland) Colin Montgomerie	0	0

2006 The Fairmont Banff Springs Golf Course, Banff, AB

Position	Player	Skins	Money ($)
Winner	(United States) John Daly	9	210,000
Runner-up	(Canada) Stephen Ames	6	95,000
Third	(Spain) Sergio García	3	55,000
T4	(United States) Jack Nicklaus	0	0
T4	(Australia) Greg Norman	0	0

2005 Nicklaus North Golf Club, Whistler, British Columbia

Position	Player	Skins	Money ($)
Winner	(Canada) Stephen Ames	7 *	150,000
Runner-up	(United States) Jack Nicklaus	7 *	120,000
Third	(United States) John Daly	3 *	65,000
Fourth	(Fiji) Vijay Singh	0 *	0

* No player won the skin on the 18th hole. The players decided to give the money to charity.

2004 Club de Golf Le Fontainebleau, Blainville, Quebec

Position	Player	Skins	Money ($)
Winner	(United States) Phil Mickelson	8	140,000
Runner-up	(United States) John Daly	4	95,000
Third	(United States) Hank Kuehne	5	85,000
Fourth	(Fiji) Vijay Singh	1	40,000

2003 Royal Niagara Golf Club, Niagara-on-the-Lake, Ontario

Position	Player	Skins	Money ($)
Winner	(Fiji) Vijay Singh	6	140,000
Runner-up	(Canada) Ian Leggatt	5	95,000
Third	(Spain) Sergio García	5	85,000
Fourth	(United States) John Daly	2	40,000

2002 The Mark O'Meara Course at Delta Grandview Resort, Huntsville, Ontario

Position	Player	Skins	Money ($)
Winner	(Spain) Sergio García	8	185,000
Runner-up	(Fiji) Vijay Singh	5	90,000
Third	(United States) John Daly	5	85,000
Fourth	(Canada) Mike Weir	0	0

2001 Angus Glen Golf Club, Markham, Ontario

Position	Player	Skins	Money ($)
Winner	(Fiji) Vijay Singh	9	180,000
Runner-up	(United States) David Duval	3	75,000
Third	(Canada) Mike Weir	4	70,000
Fourth	(Spain) Sergio García	2	35,000

2000 Predator Ridge Resort, Okanagan Valley, British Columbia

Position	Player	Skins	Money ($)
Winner	(United States) Fred Couples	7	135,000
Runner-up	(Spain) Sergio García	6	100,000
Third	(Canada) Mike Weir	3	75,000
Fourth	(United States) Phil Mickelson	2	50,000

1999 Le Diable, Mont-Tremblant, Quebec

Position	Player	Skins	Money ($)
Winner	(Canada) Mike Weir	10	210,000
Runner-up	(United States) David Duval	5	95,000
Third	(United States) John Daly	3	55,000
Fourth	(United States) Fred Couples	0	0

1998 The Links at Crowbush Cove, Morell, Prince Edward Island

Position	Player	Skins	Money ($)
Winner	(United States) Fred Couples	10	220,000
Runner-up	(United States) Mark O'Meara	4	80,000
Third	(Canada) Mike Weir	3	45,000
Fourth	(United States) John Daly	1	15,000

1997 Nicklaus North Golf Club, Whistler, British Columbia

Position	Player	Skins	Money ($)
Winner	(Australia) Greg Norman	13	275,000
Runner-up	(United States) Fred Couples	3	50,000
Third	(United States) Jack Nicklaus	2	35,000
Fourth	(England) Nick Faldo	0	0

1996 Summerlea Golf Club, Vaudreuil-Dorion, Quebec

Position	Player	Skins	Money ($)
Winner	(United States) Fred Couples	9	165,000
Runner-up	(England) Nick Faldo	7	165,000
Third	(South Africa) Ernie Els	2	30,000
Fourth	(Zimbabwe) Nick Price	0	0

1995 The National Golf Club of Canada, Woodbridge, Ontario

Position	Player	Skins	Money ($)
Winner	(England) Nick Faldo	8	160,000
Runner-up	(United States) Ben Crenshaw	6	110,000
Third	(United States) Fred Couples	4	90,000
Fourth	(Zimbabwe) Nick Price	0	0

1994 Richelieu Valley Golf Club, Sainte-Julie de Vercheres, Quebec

Position	Player	Skins	Money ($)
Winner	(United States) Fred Couples	15	240,000
Runner-up	(United States) Lee Trevino	2	20,000
Third	(Zimbabwe) Nick Price	1	10,000
Fourth	(United States) Tom Watson	0	0

1993 Devil's Pulpit Golf Club, Caledon, Ontario

Position	Player	Skins	Money ($)
Winner	(United States) Fred Couples	14	210,000
Runner-up	(United States) Raymond Floyd	3	50,000
Third	(United States) Jack Nicklaus	1	10,000
Fourth	(Zimbabwe) Nick Price	0	0
