= Kalamalka Secondary School =

High school in Canada

Kalamalka Secondary

Location
- 7900 McClounie Road; Coldstream, British Columbia, V1B 1P8; Canada; 50.22293°N 119.24897°W

Information
- School type: Public, high school
- Motto: "Towards Honour and Excellence"
- Opened: 1973
- School board: School District 22 Vernon
- Superintendent: Karla Mitchell
- Principal: Jeff Huggins
- Grades: 8-12
- Enrollment: 695 (2025/2026)
- Language: English
- Colours: Navy blue and Gold
- Team name: Lakers
- Website: https://kalamalka.sd22.bc.ca/
- Last updated: October 3, 2026

Kalamalka Secondary is a public high school in Coldstream, British Columbia, Canada, south of Vernon. It is part of School District 22 Vernon.

== Symbols ==
The Lake Monster is the mascot for Kalamalka Secondary School. It resembles an alligator in appearance and is often seen wearing the Lakers' jersey. The 'Lake Monster' is also displayed on the gymnasium walls and floor. These murals were painted in 2004 by a graduated student.

== Notable alumni ==
- Andrew Allen, Singer (graduated in 1999)
