= Lyall Hanson =

Canadian politician

Member of the British Columbia Legislative Assembly for Okanagan-Vernon Okanagan North (1986–1991)
- In office October 22, 1986 – May 28, 1996
- Preceded by: Lyle MacWilliam
- Succeeded by: April Sanders

Personal details
- Born: July 20, 1929 Domremy, Saskatchewan
- Died: April 23, 2018 (aged 88) Vernon, British Columbia
- Party: Reform Party (1994–1996); Social Credit (1991–1994)
- Occupation: Automobile Dealer

Lyall Franklin Hanson (July 20, 1929 – April 23, 2018) was a political figure in British Columbia. He represented Okanagan North from 1986 to 1991 and Okanagan-Vernon from 1991 to 1996 in the Legislative Assembly of British Columbia as a Social Credit then Reform Party member.

He was born in Domremy, Saskatchewan, the son of John Engmond Hanson and Katherine Gertrude Ruep. In 1951 he married Betty Jane Fountain. They had 5 children, Nancy, Gordon, John, Jeanne and Cathy. In 1984, Hanson married Nancy McGaw. He was a car dealer in Vernon and Vancouver in British Columbia. He served as mayor of Vernon before entering provincial politics. Hanson served in the provincial cabinet as Minister of Labour and Consumer Services from 1986 to 1989 and as Minister of Municipal Affairs from 1989 to 1991. He was named interim leader for the Social Credit party in 1994 but soon after joined the Reform Party. He died in Vernon, British Columbia in 2018 at the age of 88.
