= Vernon—Lake Country—Monashee =

Federal electoral district in British Columbia, Canada

British Columbia electoral district
- Interactive map of riding boundaries from the 2025 federal election. Points indicate the communities of Vernon and Lake Country, as well as Monashee Provincial Park.

Federal electoral district
- Legislature: House of Commons
MP
Scott Anderson
Conservative
- District created: 2023
- First contested: 2025
- Last contested: 2025

Demographics
- Population (2021): 108,606
- Electors (2025): 91,639
- Area (km²): 14,658
- Pop. density (per km²): 7.4
- Census division(s): Columbia-Shuswap, Central Kootenay, Central Okanagan, North Okanagan
- Census subdivision(s): Vernon, Lake Country, Coldstream, Spallumcheen (part), Okanagan, Lumby, Duck Lake, Nakusp, New Denver, Slocan

Vernon—Lake Country—Monashee is a federal electoral district in British Columbia, Canada. It came into effect upon the call of the 2025 Canadian federal election.

== Geography ==
Under the 2022 Canadian federal electoral redistribution the riding will largely replace North Okanagan—Shuswap.

- Gains the Fintry area from Central Okanagan—Similkameen—Nicola
- Gains the District Municipality of Lake Country, the Indian Reserve of Duck Lake 7, and the Central Okanagan regional district electoral area north of Highway 33 from Kelowna—Lake Country
- Gains the regional district electoral area of Central Kootenay H and the remainder of Central Kootenay K, plus Nakusp, New Denver, Silverton and Slocan from South Okanagan—West Kootenay
- Loses the northern half of Spallumcheen, the municipalities of Armstrong, Chase, Enderby, Salmon Arm, Sicamous, the regional district electoral areas of Columbia Shuswap C, Columbia Shuswap D, Columbia Shuswap E, Columbia Shuswap F, North Okanagan F, the remainder of Thompson-Nicola L (Grasslands), the remainder of Thompson-Nicola P (Rivers and the Peaks), and the Indian Reserves Chum Creek 2, Enderby 2, Hustalen 1, Neskonlith, North Bay 5, Okanagan (Part) 1, Quaaout 1, Sahhaltkum 4, Salmon River 1, Scotch Creek 4, Stequmwhulpa 5, Switsemalph and Switsemalph 3 to Kamloops—Shuswap—Central Rockies and Kamloops—Thompson—Nicola.

== Demographics ==
According to the 2021 Canadian census

Languages: 89.9% English, 2.3% German, 1.7% French

Religions: 57.5% No religion, 39.2% Christian (10.0% Catholic, 4.6% United Church, 3.4% Anglican, 2.1% Lutheran, 1.5% Baptist, 1.1% Pentecostal, 16.5% Other)

Median income: $39,200 (2020)

Average income: $50,760 (2020)

Panethnic groups in Vernon—Lake Country—Monashee (2021)
Panethnic group	2021	
Panethnic group	Pop.	%
European (Note: Statistic includes all persons that did not make up part of a visible minority or an indigenous identity.)	92,270	86.66%
Indigenous	7,940	7.46%
South Asian	1,810	1.7%
East Asian (Note: Statistic includes total responses of "Chinese", "Korean", and "Japanese" under visible minority section on census.)	1,695	1.59%
Southeast Asian (Note: Statistic includes total responses of "Filipino" and "Southeast Asian" under visible minority section on census.)	1,210	1.14%
African	540	0.51%
Latin American	395	0.37%
Middle Eastern (Note: Statistic includes total responses of "West Asian" and "Arab" under visible minority section on census.)	305	0.29%
Other/multiracial (Note: Statistic includes total responses of "Visible minority, n.i.e." and "Multiple visible minorities" under visible minority section on census.)	300	0.28%
Total responses	106,475	98.02%
Total population	108,625	100%
Notes: Totals greater than 100% due to multiple origin responses. Demographics based on 2022 Canadian federal electoral redistribution riding boundaries.

== History ==
Parliament	Years	Member	Party
Vernon—Lake Country—Monashee; Riding created from Central Okanagan—Similkameen—Nicola, Kelowna—Lake Country, North Okanagan—Shuswap, and South Okanagan—West Kootenay
45th	2025–present	Scott Anderson	Conservative

== Electoral results ==
2025 Canadian federal election
Party	Candidate	Votes	%	±%	Expenditures
Conservative	Scott Anderson	33,850	50.42	+6.59	
Liberal	Anna Warwick Sears	28,769	42.85	+23.08	
New Democratic	Leah Ellen Main	3,417	5.09	–16.62	
Green	Blair Visscher	1,105	1.65	–3.53	
Total valid votes/expense limit		67,141			
Total rejected ballots		432			
Turnout		67,573	72.72		
Eligible voters		92,921			
Conservative notional hold		Swing		–8.24	
Source: Elections Canada

2021 federal election redistributed results
Party	Vote	%
Conservative	24,843	43.83
New Democratic	12,308	21.71
Liberal	11,207	19.77
People's	5,391	9.51
Green	2,937	5.18
