= Cougar Canyon =

Canyon in British Columbia, Canada

Coordinates: 50°09′N 119°19′W

Cougar Canyon is a canyon near Kalamalka Lake Provincial Park, in the district municipality of Coldstream, British Columbia.

It is a long canyon running along the eastern side of Kalamalka Lake. The Canyon is very popular with the local rock climbing community. The area contains over 200 bolted routes, with plenty of room for more.

Part of Cougar Canyon is an ecological preserve maintained by the British Columbia Ministry of Environment.
