= Predator Ridge Resort =

Coordinates: 50.188°N 119.388°W

Predator Ridge Golf Resort
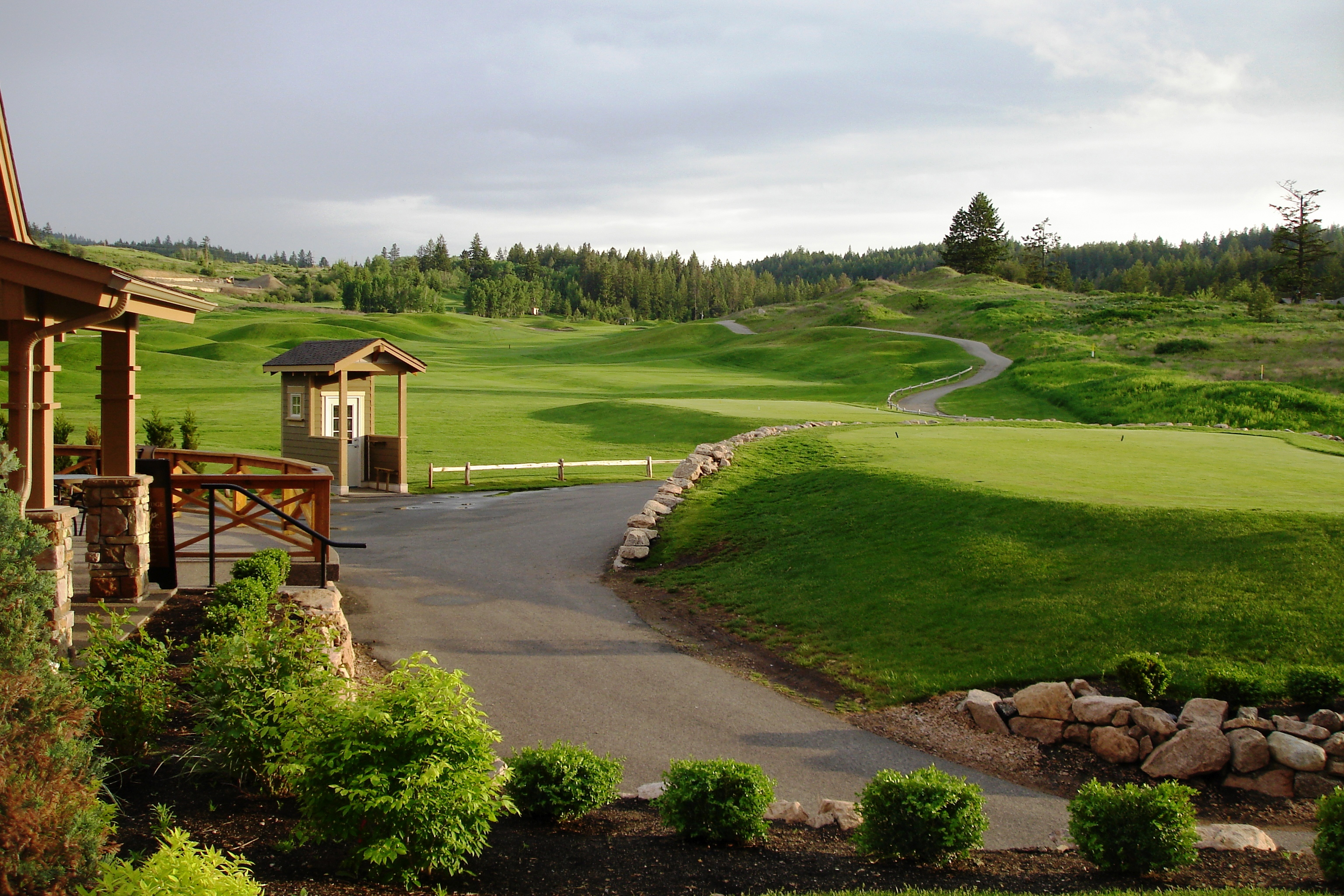
- Industry: Tourism, Real Estate
- Headquarters: Vernon, British Columbia, Canada
- Services: Resort, Golf, Lodging, Fine Dining
- Owner: Predator Ridge Limited Partnership
- Website: www.predatorridge.com

Predator Ridge Golf Resort is a 36-hole golf resort community in the Okanagan Valley outside Vernon, British Columbia.

Predator Ridge Resort spans 1,200 acres and is home to a community of over 600 people. The community was acquired by Wesbild Holdings Ltd in 2007.

Opened in 1991, Predator Ridge hosted the British Columbia Open in 1993. The original two nine-hole loops, designed by Les Furber, were named after resident birds of prey: The Osprey and The Red Tail. A third nine-hole course was built in 2000, named The Peregrine.

To expand into a 36-hole golf facility, architect Doug Carrick was hired to build 9 new holes as well as renovate the original 9-hole Peregrine course. This new 18-hole golf course was renamed The Predator Course.

In 2010, Carrick opened another 18-hole course which was named The Ridge Course. Predator Ridge is the only Golf Digest 4.5 star course in the Okanagan, and was voted as the best BC golf course by the Vancouver Sun.

The Ridge Course is a par-72 championship 18-hole course which opened in July 2010. It was voted best new golf course in Canada in 2010 by Scoregolf. From the tournament tees, The Ridge Course measures 7123 yards with a slope rating of 133 and course rating of 73.8.

The Predator course hosted the Telus World Skins Game, twice, in 2000 and 2008. It is a par-71 golf course with elevated greens and links-style bunkers. From the tournament tees, The Predator Course measures 7090 yards with a slope rating of 137 and course rating of 74.2.
