= Kevin Acton =

Canadian politician

Kevin Acton MLA

Member of the British Columbia Legislative Assembly for Vernon-Lumby
- Incumbent
- Assumed office October 24, 2026
- Premier: Lorne Doerkson
- Preceded by: Harwinder Sandhu

Mayor of Lumby
- In office April 2009 – November 2, 2026
- Preceded by: Eric Foster
- Succeeded by: Various Acting

Personal details
- Party: BC Conservative

Kevin Acton MLA is a Canadian politician who is the British Columbia MLA for Vernon-Lumby since 2026. He previously served as the mayor of Lumby, British Columbia from 2009 to 2026. He represents the Conservative party for the Vernon-Lumby riding since his election in the 2026 British Columbia general election. Acton was re-elected to a sixth consecutive term as Mayor in the October 2026 municipal election and resigned upon taking his provincial office. He claims he will personally fund a by-election in January or February 2027 following his win for the MLA seat. He previously ran in the 2024 British Columbia general election as the BC United candidate but ran as an independent after his former party withdrew from the election.

== Election history ==
=== Provincial ===
2026 British Columbia general election: Vernon-Lumby
Party	Candidate	Votes	%	±%	Expenditures
Conservative	Kevin Acton	13,304	50.63		
New Democratic	Harwinder Sandhu	9,920	37.75		
Green	Blair Visscher	1,842	7.01	—	
OneBC	Chantel Gibbs	1,178	4.48	—	
Total valid votes		26,244	99.87		
Total rejected ballots		33	0.13		
Turnout		26,277			
Registered voters					
Conservative gain from New Democratic		Swing		+7.38	
Source: Elections BC

2024 British Columbia general election: Vernon-Lumby
Party	Candidate	Votes	%	±%	Expenditures
New Democratic	Harwinder Sandhu	11,837	42.7%	+6.0	
Conservative	Dennis Giesbrecht	11,361	41.0%	+28.0	
Unaffiliated	Kevin Acton	4,266	15.4%		
Libertarian	Robert Johnson	265	1.0%		
Total valid votes		27,729	–		
Total rejected ballots					
Turnout					
Registered voters					
Source: Elections BC
