= James Green (Canadian football) =

Canadian football player (born 1983)

Profile
- Position: Defensive back

Personal information
- Born: June 22, 1983 (age 43); Langley, British Columbia, Canada
- Listed height: 5 ft 10 in (1.78 m)
- Listed weight: 215 lb (98 kg)

Career information
- High school: Clarence Fulton
- University: Calgary
- CFL draft: 2009: 3rd round, 18th overall pick
- Expansion draft: 2013: 2nd round

Career history
- 2009: Toronto Argonauts
- 2010: Edmonton Eskimos*
- 2010–2013: Winnipeg Blue Bombers
- 2015: Ottawa Redblacks
- * Offseason or practice squad member only
- Stats at CFL.ca

James Green (born June 22, 1983) is a Canadian former professional football linebacker.

Green played community football in Vernon, British Columbia, and then for the Okanagan Sun as a junior player. Green attended the University of Calgary, where he played CIS football for the Calgary Dinos. He was drafted by the Toronto Argonauts in the third round of the 2009 CFL draft. Green was later released by the Argonauts on June 17, 2010, and was signed by the Edmonton Eskimos on July 9, 2010, but later released. He then signed with the Winnipeg Blue Bombers on August 3, 2010, but was released in 2011 after playing one game for the Blue Bombers. On December 16, 2013, Green was drafted by the Ottawa Redblacks in the 2013 CFL Expansion Draft. Played 2014-2016. On February 13, 2016, Green signed with the Calgary Stampeders. On June 14, 2016, Green was released.
