= Harwinder Sandhu =

Canadian politician

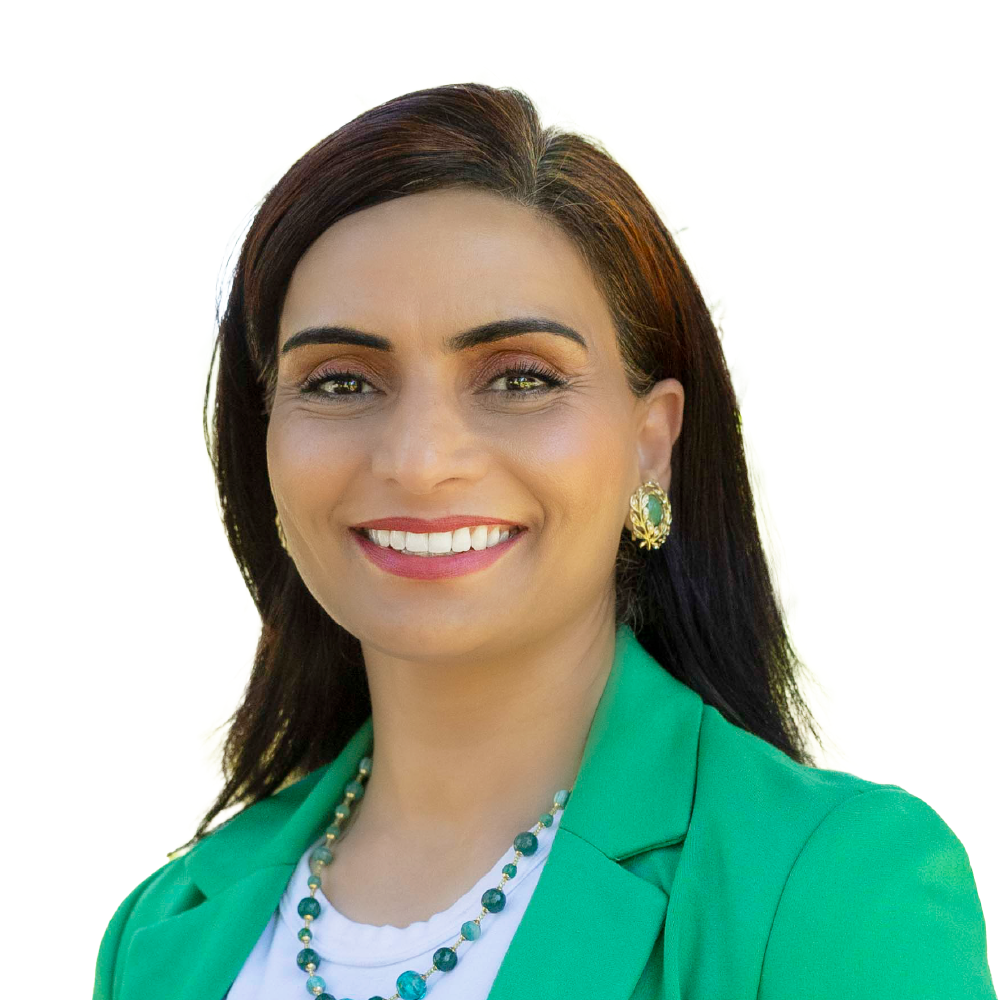
- Campaign portrait, 2024

Parliamentary Secretary for Agriculture of British Columbia
- In office November 18, 2024 – October 24, 2026
- Premier: David Eby
- Preceded by: Position established
- Succeeded by: Vacant

Parliamentary Secretary for Seniors' Services and Long-Term Care of British Columbia
- In office December 17, 2022 – November 18, 2024
- Premier: David Eby
- Preceded by: Mable Elmore
- Succeeded by: Susie Chant

Member of the British Columbia Legislative Assembly for Vernon-Lumby
- In office October 24, 2020 – November 20, 2026
- Preceded by: Eric Foster
- Succeeded by: Kevin Acton

Personal details
- Party: BC NDP
- Other political affiliations: New Democratic Party (federal)

Harwinder Kaur Sandhu is a Canadian politician who was the MLA for Vernon-Monashee in the Legislative Assembly of British Columbia from 2020 to 2026. She was first elected in the 2020 British Columbia general election, making history as the first person of colour to win the seat and the first BC NDP representative elected there. She was re-elected in the 2024 election and represented the electoral district of Vernon-Lumby as a member of the British Columbia New Democratic Party until 2026. MLA Sandhu was appointed as Parliamentary Secretary for Agriculture in November 2024. She previously served as Parliamentary Secretary for Seniors’ Services and Long-Term Care.

== Electoral record ==
=== Federal ===
2019 Canadian federal election: North Okanagan—Shuswap
Party	Candidate	Votes	%	±%	Expenditures
Conservative	Mel Arnold	36,154	48.76	+9.46	$68,251.58
Liberal	Cindy Derkaz	16,783	22.64	–7.31	$87,574.32
New Democratic	Harwinder Sandhu	11,353	15.31	–10.29	$13,852.59
Green	Marc Reinarz	7,828	10.56	+5.40	$9,953.69
People's	Kyle Delfing	2,027	2.73	–	$5,718.06
Total valid votes/expense limit		74,145	99.40	–	$135,980.25
Total rejected ballots		449	0.60	+0.39	
Turnout		74,594	69.25	–2.61	
Eligible voters		107,712			
Conservative hold		Swing		+8.39	
Source: Elections Canada

=== Provincial ===
2026 British Columbia general election: Vernon-Lumby
Party	Candidate	Votes	%	±%	Expenditures
Conservative	Kevin Acton	13,304	50.63		
New Democratic	Harwinder Sandhu	9,920	37.75		
Green	Blair Visscher	1,842	7.01	—	
OneBC	Chantel Gibbs	1,178	4.48	—	
Total valid votes		26,244	99.87		
Total rejected ballots		33	0.13		
Turnout		26,277			
Registered voters					
Conservative gain from New Democratic		Swing		+7.38	
Source: Elections BC

2024 British Columbia general election: Vernon-Lumby
Party	Candidate	Votes	%	±%	Expenditures
New Democratic	Harwinder Sandhu	11,837	42.7%	+6.0	
Conservative	Dennis Giesbrecht	11,361	41.0%	+28.0	
Unaffiliated	Kevin Acton	4,266	15.4%		
Libertarian	Robert Johnson	265	1.0%		
Total valid votes		27,729	–		
Total rejected ballots					
Turnout					
Registered voters					
Source: Elections BC

2020 British Columbia general election: Vernon-Monashee
Party	Candidate	Votes	%	±%	Expenditures
New Democratic	Harwinder Sandhu	10,222	36.56	+7.20	$4,746.98
Liberal	Eric Foster	9,798	35.05	−12.82	$30,325.57
Green	Keli Westgate	4,464	15.97	−5.60	$9,375.32
Conservative	Kyle Delfing	3,472	12.42	–	$0.00
Total valid votes		27,956	100.00	–	
Total rejected ballots		96	0.34	–0.03	
Turnout		28,052	52.76	–6.20	
Registered voters		53,169			
New Democratic gain from Liberal		Swing		+10.01	
Source: Elections BC

2017 British Columbia general election: Kelowna-Mission
Party	Candidate	Votes	%	±%	Expenditures
Liberal	Steve Thomson	15,041	57.18	+0.32	$53,316
New Democratic	Harwinder Sandhu	5,720	21.24	−4.6	$13,757
Green	Rainer Wilkins	3,836	14.24	–	$18
Conservative	Charles Hardy	1,976	7.34	−5.33	$8,095
Total valid votes		26,933	100.00	–	
Total rejected ballots		112	0.42	−0.24	
Turnout		27,045	57.67	+4.09	
Registered voters		46,898			
Source: Elections BC
