= BX Falls =

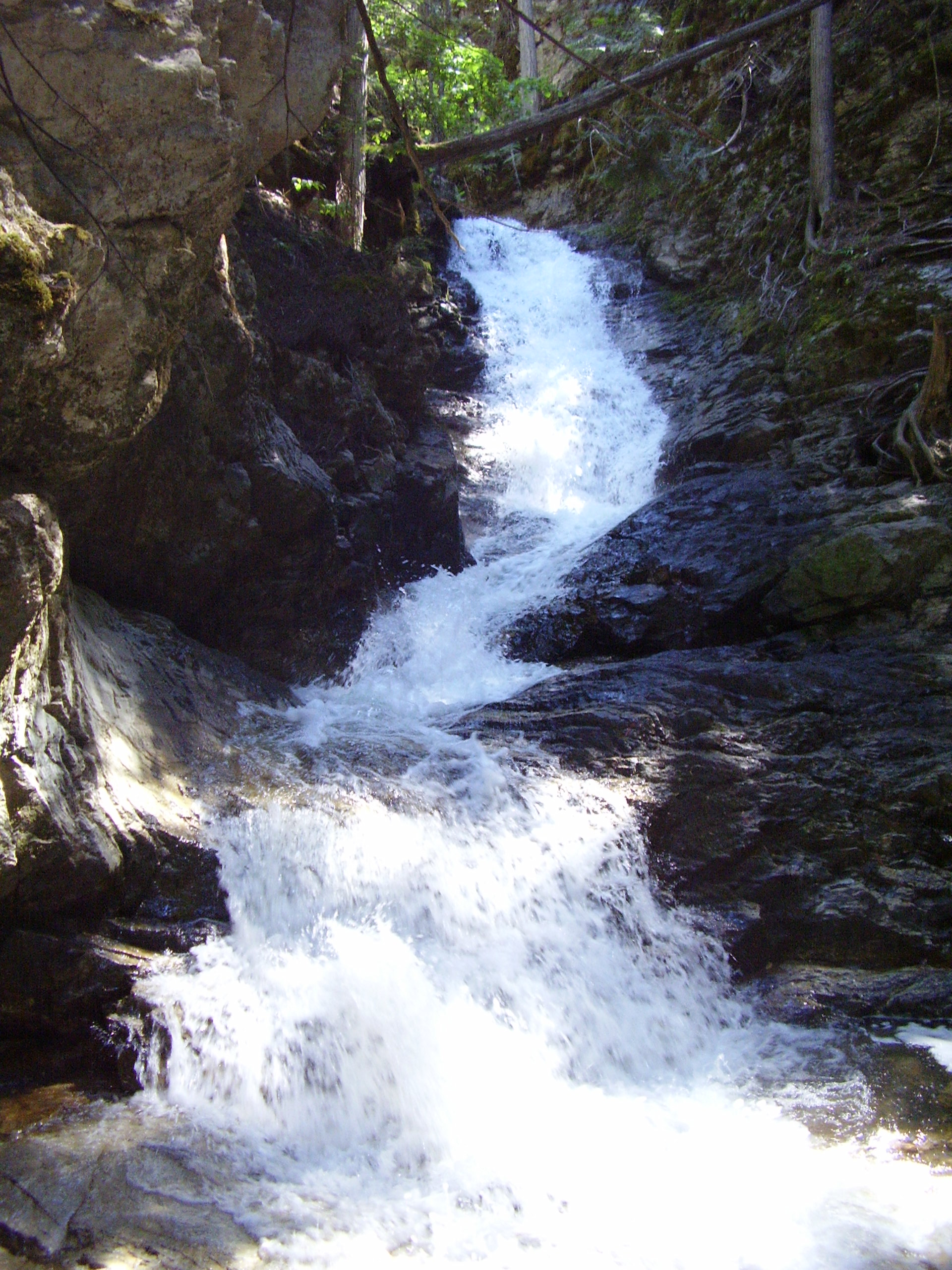
- Interactive map of BX Falls
- Location: Near Vernon, British Columbia, Canada
- Coordinates: 50°19′00″N 119°11′00″W
- Type: Cascade
- Total height: 9.1 metres (30 ft)
- Number of drops: 1
- Longest drop: 9.1 metres (30 ft)
- Total width: 1.5 metres (5 ft)
- Watercourse: BX Creek

BX Falls is a small waterfall just northeast of Vernon, British Columbia, Canada, in electoral area C in the Regional District of North Okanagan. It is located just downstream from Tillicum Road's crossing of BX Creek. The falls are located in between Tillicum Road and Star Road, both of which branch off Silverstar Road. A trail runs between the two roads and a short side trail descends into the canyon off the main trail and allows visitors to see the falls up close.

== Stature ==
The falls are within a short but steep canyon along BX Creek just below where the creek passes under Tillicum Road. The creek flows into the canyon, flows through a couple of small pools before cascading 9.1 metres (30 ft) into a small clearing in the canyon below. The falls, while legitimately considered a "waterfall", are not all that steep, so in the winter when the falls freeze over and there is enough snow that piles on top of the ice on the falls it is actually quite easy to climb up the falls without any special equipment.

== See also ==
- List of waterfalls
- List of waterfalls in British Columbia
