= Alice Barrett Parke =

Canadian pioneer and diarist

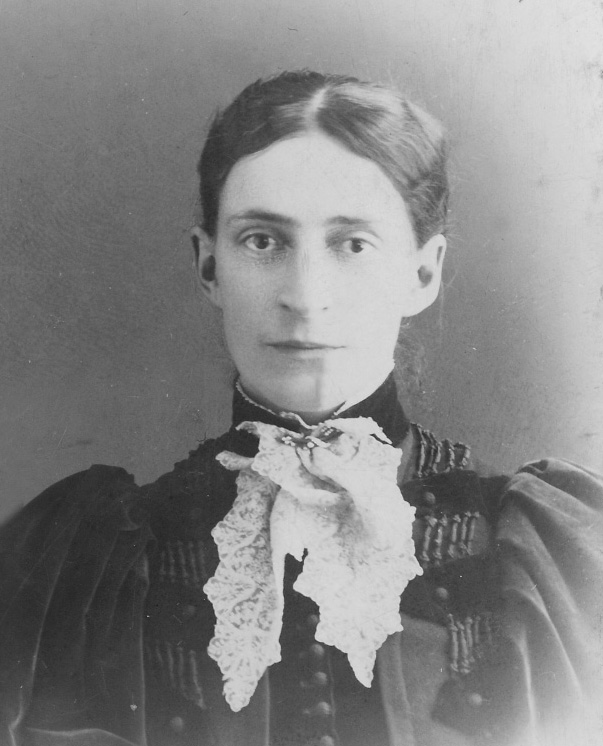
Alice Barrett Parke, c. 1897

Alice Barrett Parke (November 5, 1861 – December 8, 1952) was a Canadian woman pioneer and diarist who lived for many years in Vernon, British Columbia. After her death, her extensive diaries were donated to the Greater Vernon Museum and Archives in Vernon, where they became the basis of an academic book and related publications.

== Lineage and early life ==
Barrett Parke was descended from a long line of Irish warriors and aristocrats who settled in Ireland in 1170. Her branch of the Barrett family (motto: Omnia virtute no vi) came originally from Normandy, and is believed to have been among Crusaders who accompanied Richard the Lionheart.

Barrett Parke's father, Theobold (Toby) Butler Barrett, was born at Banagher, Ireland, in 1817 and was thirteen years old when the Barretts sailed to Canada and settled in Sorel, Quebec. Upon his marriage in 1850 to Emily Lands, of Pennsylvania Dutch stock, he moved with his new wife to Port Dover, Ontario, where he found a position in Her Majesty's Customs service.

Between 1851 and 1869 Toby and Emily Barrett had eight children, of whom Alice was the fourth and youngest daughter. Born in Port Dover on November 5, 1861, she received an education grounded in Latin and some French. In her diaries, she described her family as large, loving, devout, intellectually lively and close-knit.

== Early settler development of the Okanagan Valley and City of Vernon ==
During the summer of 1811, the North West Company sent their employee, David Stuart, to the Okanagan Valley in search of an overland route for the fur trade. He made his way to the interior of British Columbia, and followed a trail north along the west side of Okanagan Lake, later known as the Brigade Trail. In the 1850s, miners arrived from the south seeking gold, and soon outnumbered the fur trappers. Other early settlers pre-empted acreages from Sicamous and Enderby in the north to Summerland and Penticton in the south.

By 1892, the City of Vernon, with an area of 3.12 square miles, had been legally incorporated, and the men of the town elected their first council the following year. The population was approximately four hundred people, and included young men from England and other parts of Canada, retired civil servants, professional men, shopkeepers, loggers, builders, prostitutes, and farmers.

== Arrival in the Okanagan Valley ==
In March 1891, at age 29, Alice Butler Barrett made the long journey by train and ship from Port Dover, Ontario to the interior of British Columbia. Her younger brother, Harry, had preceded her by five years to assist their Uncle Henry in running the Mountain Meadow Ranch at Otter Lake in the Spallumcheen Valley, a few miles north of Vernon. The two bachelors needed her to take care of domestic duties, which she agreed to do for a year. Henceforth, her home would be the primitive three-roomed cabin on the ranch.

== Courtship, marriage, and domestic life ==
When Harold (Hal) Randolph Parke first met her, Alice Barrett considered herself a confirmed spinster. Within six months, she received the first of several proposals of marriage from Parke, and eventually they married in Port Dover. Her husband was also of Irish descent, born into a well-to-do London, Ontario family, and one of four lawyer sons of the Honorable Thomas Parke, an architect and builder who served as Surveyor-General in the Baldwin-LaFontaine administration. He attended Upper Canada College and ran away as a teenager to join Confederate forces during the US Civil War; he was wounded in action and eventually retrieved by an irate father who brought him home. After completing his Law studies, Parke worked for a time at his brother Ephraim's London law firm. But seeking adventure, he became the one-hundredth man to enlist in the North-West Mounted Police, remaining a member of the Force for two years and taking part in an encounter at Wood Mountain Fort with Sitting Bull.

When Parke met Alice Barrett, he was a 45-year-old widower operating a business hauling freight between Vernon and Enderby. He was also part-owner of a Vernon sawmill and brick kiln. Subsequently he held positions as Assessment Officer for the City of Vernon, Assistant Post Master, Constable for the City, Jailer, manager of the B.X. Ranch, Superintendent of Roads, and finally Post Master again. Marriage to Parke meant a substantial step up the social ladder for Alice Barrett.

== The diaries ==
Diaries written by pioneer women in British Columbia's southern interior are extremely rare, and Barrett Parke's writings are among the few that have survived. In all, Barrett Parke wrote nearly half a million words describing life in the interior of British Columbia during the final decade of the nineteenth century.

At her brother Harry's urging, Barrett Parke began writing a daily diary entry so that family in Port Dover could gain insights into life in the pioneer West. She wrote in 31 notebooks of many kinds, in ink and in a sloping, confident hand. Several gaps in the text coincide with lengthy visits to Port Dover.

The diaries are divided into five sections:

- March 1891 to June 1892: Barrett Parke's arrival in the Spallumcheen Valley, a visit to Vancouver and Victoria, and her return to Port Dover at the end of her promised year.
- January 27 to February 6, 1893: a brief account of a harrowing and blizzard-plagued trans-Canada journey that she and her husband undertook after their wedding in Port Dover, written on the blank pages of a Canadian Pacific Railway (CPR) timetable. Afterward, there is a pause of nine months.
- November 1893 to October 1896: her life after she moved to Vernon.
- October 1896 to May 1898: the sudden move to the B.X. Ranch, where her husband became manager.
- June 1898 to May 1900: resettlement in Vernon, assisting Harold Parke in running the Vernon Post Office.

Besides describing her own family life, the diaries contained detailed portraits of people whom Barrett Parke met and befriended. They included notables like Catherine Schubert (of Overlanders renown) and her family; Lord Aberdeen (Governor-General of Canada) and his wife, Ishbel); Francis Barnard, operator of the Barnard Express stagecoach line; Pauline Johnson, a Canadian poet; mayors, councilmen, provincial politicians, premiers, and parliamentarians. She also took time to know and describe shopkeepers, blacksmiths, builders, men looking for wives, women looking for husbands, gamblers, loggers, farmers, and children.

Alice Barrett Parke detailed many significant events that occurred during the final decade of the nineteenth century in the Okanagan Valley. Soon after she arrived, the stagecoach service between centers at the northern end of the Valley came to an end. The Shuswap & Okanagan Railway Company had pushed through a spur line from Sicamous to Okanagan Landing, which meant that Okanagan residents could travel by train all the way to Vancouver, or alternatively to points east. Kelowna and Penticton to the south were serviced from the Landing by CPR sternwheelers. She also wrote about periods of severe drought, devastating floods, earthquakes, deadly winters and widespread epidemics of diseases such as typhoid, scarlet fever and diphtheria, which were often fatal, especially to young children. She provided explicit details of the spousal and child abuse that were rampant at the time. While displaying early racist attitudes toward local First Nations people and the Chinese who helped to build the railroad, she moderated these attitudes over time, and became a strong opponent of the Chinese Head Tax.

== Closing entries and return to Ontario ==
Alice Barrett Parke's journals came to an abrupt end in May 1900. The final entry stopped suddenly in the middle of a sentence and the middle of a page, without explanation. Almost exactly forty weeks later, Barrett Parke gave birth to her only child – Emily Louisa Parke, born in February 1901. Barrett Parke was 39 at the time of the delivery. The Parkes' infant daughter survived only nine months and died that November after an illness lasting several weeks.

The Parkes remained in Vernon until Hal Parke's retirement in 1905 from his job as Post Master. He was suffering eye problems which required the attention of a specialist. After consulting with doctors in Ontario, they returned to Vernon for a short visit the following spring to sell their property. They then left for central Canada.

== Final years ==
At some point the Parkes again moved west, this time to Fort Saskatchewan in Alberta, where they operated a small market garden for a few years. With the exception of a single journal covering their daily life in Alberta from 1912 to 1915, no diaries emerged from the household. The entries for the first two years of this final volume were written by Harold Parke and are in note form only, giving abbreviated information on events, weather conditions, and so on. Deteriorating health prevented him from writing after November 24, 1913, and Alice Barrett Parke took over. Harold Parke's condition was in its final decline during the subsequent months, and they returned to her family in Port Dover in October 1914. On November 30, 1914, she wrote the entry: "Hal is gone." Harold Parke was 68 when he died from thrombosis and myocarditis. Alice Barrett Parke survived him by 38 years, and lived on in Port Dover. She died there in 1952 aged 91.

== The diaries: Discovery and publication ==
In summer 1996, 31 notebooks were delivered to the Vernon Archives by an Ontario donor. All that was known at the time was that they had been written by "a Vernon postmaster's wife"; that they covered the years from 1891 to 1900; and that they had lain undisturbed for more than a hundred years in an old rawhide box in the attic of the family home in Port Dover.

Transcription of the diaries began immediately. When the second volume had been transcribed, Museum volunteer and local historian Jo Fraser Jones was selected to complete transcription work and produce an edited version of the diaries for publication. Transcription took fourteen months, after which work on the book began. Hobnobbing with a Countess and Other Okanagan Adventures was published by the University of British Columbia Press in 2001, and has since been assigned as a textbook for several university-level courses on early British Columbia history and BC women.

== Bibliography ==
- Hobnobbing with a Countess and Other Okanagan Adventures, Jo Fraser Jones, ed. (Vancouver, UBC Press, 2001). ISBN 0-7735-2172-0
- Jo Fraser Jones, "A Hardier Stock of Womankind: Alice Barrett Parke in British Columbia," Sharon Anne Cook, Lorna R. McLean, Kate O'Rourke eds., Framing Our Past: Canadian Women's History in the 20th Century (Montreal & Kingston, McGill Queen's University Press, 2001) pp. 86–95. ISBN 0-7735-2172-0
- Mike Roberts, "Alice Barrett Parke," in Okanagan Pioneers and Places (CanWest Global TV, 2001), 30-minute TV program.
