= April Sanders =

Canadian politician

Doctor April Sanders

Member of the British Columbia Legislative Assembly for Okanagan-Vernon
- In office May 28, 1996 – May 16, 2001
- Preceded by: Lyall Hanson
- Succeeded by: Tom Christensen

Personal details
- Party: Liberal
- Profession: Educator, physician

April Sanders is a former educator, physician and former political figure in British Columbia, Canada. She represented Okanagan-Vernon in the Legislative Assembly of British Columbia from 1996 to 2001 as a Liberal.

Sanders taught elementary, secondary and post-secondary school students before studying medicine. She specialized in family practice and sports medicine. Sanders did not run for reelection in 2001.
