= Scott Anderson (Canadian politician) =

Canadian politician

Scott Anderson MP

Member of Parliament for Vernon—Lake Country—Monashee
- Incumbent
- Assumed office April 28, 2025
- Preceded by: Constituency established

Leader of the Conservative Party of British Columbia
- Interim; October 4, 2017 – April 8, 2019
- Preceded by: Dan Brooks (2016)
- Succeeded by: Trevor Bolin

Vernon City Councillor
- In office 2014–2022

Personal details
- Party: Conservative
- Other political affiliations: BC Conservative

Scott Anderson MP is a Canadian politician who has served as a member of Parliament (MP) representing the riding of Vernon—Lake Country—Monashee in the House of Commons since 2025. He is a member of the Conservative Party of Canada. Prior to federal politics, he served as interim leader of the Conservative Party of British Columbia from 2017 to 2019.

Anderson served as a Vernon city councillor from 2014 to 2022 before unsuccessfully running for mayor.

== Member of Parliament ==
Anderson was elected in the 2025 federal election.

In January 2026, Anderson stated that he was courted by the Liberal Party to cross the floor and join the party, yet no other Okanagan Conservative MP's corroborated that the Liberal Party had been asking local members to cross. Afterwards, he released a statement reaffirming his commitment to the party.

Anderson has focused his efforts in Ottawa to bring light to important local topics, including spending considerable time advocating for a local ostrich farm which had been found to have engaged in activity violating health and safety laws.

In a series of opinion pieces published online by a local news agency, Anderson makes it clear he is a climate change skeptic, equating the belief in climate change to the belief in the Great Horse Manure Crisis of 1894, and labeling scientists and those who study climate change as "extremists" who use "pseudo-scientific-sounding babble." Anderson frequently writes about issues of homelessness and addiction, and does not believe that panhandlers do so out of necessity due to poverty, but are either: alcoholics or drug addicts, people with mental issues, scammers, hobos, or young transients. The views of Anderson are well laid out in his bi-weekly column at https://infonews.ca/author/sanderson/where over 60 opinion pieces are published.

In September 2026, Anderson was involved in a controversial situation when retired long-term Conservative MP Darrel Stinson pulled his support for Anderson for a number of reasons. From his hospital bed Stinson said in a video posted to his Facebook page "I just want everybody to know I do not support Scott Anderson. It's all lies what he is saying" as well as "I can't stand this any longer - these lies." Anderson claimed "It's a fake."

One of the key planks of Anderson's election campaign in 2025 was to focus on issues important to the average Canadian, including "fighting to stop gender surgery," "Increasing our resource job," and fighting the "cull ordering threatening a local Ostrich farm in Edgewood."

== Electoral history ==
2025 Canadian federal election: Vernon—Lake Country—Monashee
| Party | Candidate | Votes | % | ±% | Expenditures |
|---|---|---|---|---|---|
| Conservative | Scott Anderson | 33,850 | 50.42 | +6.59 | $63,852.05 |
| Liberal | Anna Warwick Sears | 28,769 | 42.85 | +23.08 | $93,602.15 |
| New Democratic | Leah Ellen Main | 3,417 | 5.09 | –16.62 | $17,888.54 |
| Green | Blair Visscher | 1,105 | 1.65 | –3.53 | $5,197.12 |
| Total valid votes/expense limit | | 67,141 | 99.36 | – | $145,609.55 |
| Total rejected ballots | | 432 | 0.64 | – | |
| Turnout | | 67,573 | 72.72 | – | |
| Eligible voters | | 92,921 | | | |
| Conservative notional hold | | Swing | | –8.24 | |
Source: Elections Canada

2022 Vernon mayoral election
| Mayoral candidate | Vote | % |
|---|---|---|
| Victor Cumming (X) † | 4,346 | 50.84 |
| Scott Anderson | 3,673 | 42.96 |
| Erik Olesen | 530 | 6.20 |

2013 British Columbia general election: Vernon-Monashee
| Party | Candidate | Votes | % |
|---|---|---|---|
| Liberal | Eric Bailey Foster | 12,503 | 46.34 |
| New Democratic | Mark Steven Olsen | 9,233 | 34.22 |
| Conservative | Scott Anderson | 3,169 | 11.75 |
| Green | Rebecca Helps | 1,905 | 7.06 |
| Independent | Korry Zepik | 169 | 0.63 |
| Total valid votes | | 26,979 | 100.00 |
| Total rejected ballots | | 77 | 0.28 |
| Turnout | | 27,056 | 57.41 |
Source: Elections BC

https://www.civicinfo.bc.ca/election-results-v3/index.php?localgovernmentid=141&select-year=2018&select-view-by=municipality?select-year=2018&select-view-by=municipality&localgovernmentid=141

https://www.civicinfo.bc.ca/election-results-v3/index.php?localgovernmentid=141&select-year=2018&select-view-by=municipality?select-year=2018&select-view-by=municipality&localgovernmentid=141
