= Coldstream, British Columbia =

Coldstream
- District municipality
- The Corporation of the District of Coldstream
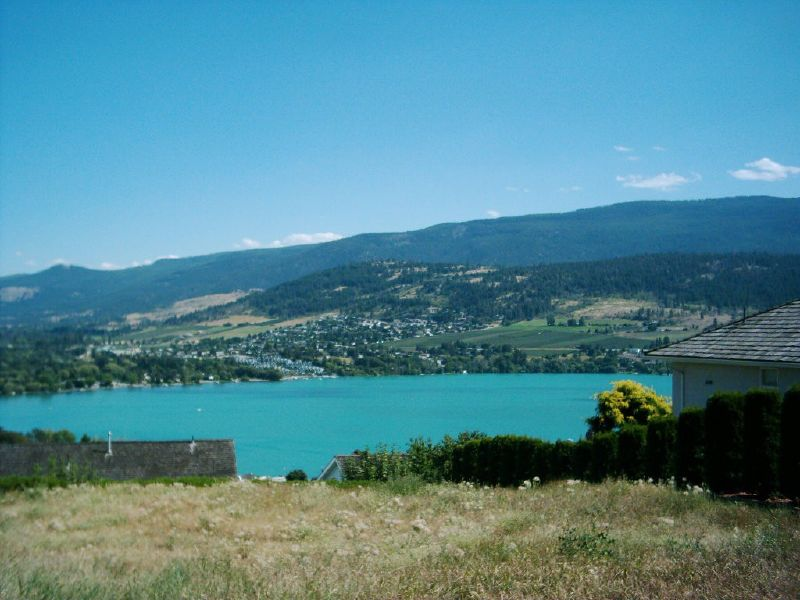
- Kalamalka Lake and Coldstream

- Location of Coldstream in British Columbia
- Coordinates: 50°13′12″N 119°14′53″W
- Country: Canada
- Province: British Columbia
- Regional district: North Okanagan
- Incorporated: 1906

Government
  - Mayor: Ruth Hoyte
  - Governing Body: Coldstream District council
  - MP: Scott Anderson (Conservative)
  - MLA: Tara Armstrong (Independent)

Area
  - Total: 66.57 km^{2} (25.70 sq mi)
- Elevation: 430 m (1,410 ft)

Population (2021)
  - Total: 11,171
  - Density: 167.8/km^{2} (435/sq mi)
- Time zone: UTC−07:00 (PT)
- Postal code span: V1B
- Area codes: 250, 778, 236
- Website: districtofcoldstream.ca

Coldstream is a district municipality in British Columbia, Canada, located at the northern end of Kalamalka Lake in the Okanagan Valley. Incorporated on December 21, 1906, Coldstream celebrated its centennial in 2006. The municipality is directly southeast of Vernon and is considered part of Greater Vernon. It is a member municipality of, and also the location of the head offices, of the Regional District of North Okanagan.

== Coldstream Ranch ==
Coldstream is known for the Coldstream Ranch, established in 1863 by Captain Charles Frederick Houghton. He transferred the ranch to Forbes G. and Charles Albert Vernon, who in 1891 sold it to The 7th Earl of Aberdeen (later created, in 1916, The 1st Marquess of Aberdeen and Temair), future Governor General of Canada (1893–1898). The ranch was purchased by its current owners in 1994 and continues to be a working cattle ranch.

== Government ==
Coldstream is governed by a seven-member council, led by Mayor Ruth Hoyte. The municipality is represented by member of Parliament Scott Anderson (Vernon—Lake Country—Monashee) and member of the Legislative Assembly Tara Armstrong (Kelowna-Lake Country-Coldstream).

== Economy ==
The Greater Vernon area was once based in forestry and agriculture. However, manufacturing, retail trade and services are now the primary industries. A suburban community known as Middleton Mountain is located in Coldsteam at the north end of Kalamalka Lake.

== Demographics ==
Historical population
Year	Pop.	±%
1921	711	—
1931	867	+21.9%
1941	867	+0.0%
1951	1,402	+61.7%
1956	1,613	+15.0%
1961	2,161	+34.0%
1966	2,660	+23.1%
1971	3,602	+35.4%
1976	4,995	+38.7%
1981	6,450	+29.1%
1986	6,872	+6.5%
1991	7,999	+16.4%
1996	8,975	+12.2%
2001	9,106	+1.5%
2006	9,471	+4.0%
2011	10,314	+8.9%
2016	10,648	+3.2%
2021	11,171	+4.9%
Sources: Statistics Canada

In the 2021 Canadian census conducted by Statistics Canada, Coldstream had a population of 11,171 living in 4,100 of its 4,341 total private dwellings, a change of 4.9% from its 2016 population of 10,648. With a land area of 66.57 km^{2} (25.70 sq mi), it had a population density of 167.8/km^{2} (434.6/sq mi) in 2021.

=== Ethnicity ===
Panethnic groups in the District of Coldstream (2001−2021)
Panethnic group	2021		2016		2011		2006		2001	
Panethnic group	Pop.	%	Pop.	%	Pop.	%	Pop.	%	Pop.	%
European (Note: Statistic includes all persons that did not make up part of a visible minority or an indigenous identity.)	9,910	90.17%	9,615	91.7%	9,265	90.92%	8,900	95.29%	8,555	95.27%
Indigenous	540	4.91%	420	4.01%	555	5.45%	250	2.68%	200	2.23%
East Asian (Note: Statistic includes total responses of "Chinese", "Korean", and "Japanese" under visible minority section on census.)	270	2.46%	245	2.34%	115	1.13%	135	1.45%	110	1.22%
South Asian	125	1.14%	105	1%	120	1.18%	10	0.11%	115	1.28%
Southeast Asian (Note: Statistic includes total responses of "Filipino" and "Southeast Asian" under visible minority section on census.)	70	0.64%	55	0.52%	60	0.59%	20	0.21%	10	0.11%
African	40	0.36%	35	0.33%	0	0%	0	0%	0	0%
Latin American	25	0.23%	0	0%	0	0%	0	0%	0	0%
Middle Eastern (Note: Statistic includes total responses of "West Asian" and "Arab" under visible minority section on census.)	0	0%	0	0%	0	0%	0	0%	0	0%
Other/multiracial (Note: Statistic includes total responses of "Visible minority, n.i.e." and "Multiple visible minorities" under visible minority section on census.)	10	0.09%	10	0.1%	35	0.34%	15	0.16%	0	0%
Total responses	10,990	98.38%	10,485	98.47%	10,190	98.8%	9,340	98.62%	8,980	98.62%
Total population	11,171	100%	10,648	100%	10,314	100%	9,471	100%	9,106	100%
Note: Totals greater than 100% due to multiple origin responses.

=== Religion ===
According to the 2021 census, religious groups in Coldstream included:

- Irreligion (6,245 persons or 56.8%)
- Christianity (4,540 persons or 41.3%)
- Sikhism (95 persons or 0.9%)
- Buddhism (25 persons or 0.2%)
- Judaism (20 persons or 0.2%)
- Hinduism (10 persons or 0.1%)
- Islam (10 persons or 0.1%)
- Other (55 persons or 0.5%)

== Education ==
Covered by School District 22 Vernon, Coldstream is home to Coldstream Elementary School, Kidston Elementary School, and Kalamalka Secondary School. The municipality is served by the Vernon campus of Okanagan College.

== Climate ==
Coldstream has a dry – almost semi-arid climate – with hot sunny summers and cool cloudy winters.

Weather facts:

- Driest year (1952) = 242 mm (10 in)
- Wettest year (1996) = 633 mm (25 in)
- Warmest year (1987) = 9.2 °C (49 °F)
- Coldest year (1916) = 5.0 °C (41 °F)

Climate data for Coldstream
Month	Jan	Feb	Mar	Apr	May	Jun	Jul	Aug	Sep	Oct	Nov	Dec	Year
Record high °C (°F)	14.5 (58.1)	13.9 (57.0)	21.0 (69.8)	29.4 (84.9)	34.5 (94.1)	37.0 (98.6)	40.0 (104.0)	37.8 (100.0)	33.9 (93.0)	26.7 (80.1)	18.9 (66.0)	15.0 (59.0)	40.0 (104.0)
Mean daily maximum °C (°F)	−1.9 (28.6)	1.6 (34.9)	8.4 (47.1)	14.7 (58.5)	19.4 (66.9)	23.1 (73.6)	26.6 (79.9)	26.2 (79.2)	20.2 (68.4)	12.1 (53.8)	3.7 (38.7)	−1.3 (29.7)	12.7 (54.9)
Mean daily minimum °C (°F)	−8.1 (17.4)	−5.5 (22.1)	−1.8 (28.8)	2.0 (35.6)	6.1 (43.0)	9.6 (49.3)	11.6 (52.9)	11.3 (52.3)	7.2 (45.0)	2.5 (36.5)	−2.5 (27.5)	−6.9 (19.6)	2.1 (35.8)
Record low °C (°F)	−35.6 (−32.1)	−36.1 (−33.0)	−28.9 (−20.0)	−10.6 (12.9)	−5.0 (23.0)	0.0 (32.0)	3.3 (37.9)	−1.7 (28.9)	−5.0 (23.0)	−20.5 (−4.9)	−32.0 (−25.6)	−38.9 (−38.0)	−38.9 (−38.0)
Average precipitation mm (inches)	40.2 (1.58)	34.3 (1.35)	25.8 (1.02)	29.0 (1.14)	46.5 (1.83)	53.9 (2.12)	40.7 (1.60)	42.8 (1.69)	37.3 (1.47)	33.3 (1.31)	48.1 (1.89)	52.4 (2.06)	484.4 (19.07)
Average rainfall mm (inches)	7.3 (0.29)	12.1 (0.48)	19.7 (0.78)	28.7 (1.13)	46.5 (1.83)	53.9 (2.12)	40.7 (1.60)	42.8 (1.69)	37.3 (1.47)	32.1 (1.26)	25.3 (1.00)	10.0 (0.39)	356.5 (14.04)
Average snowfall cm (inches)	32.9 (13.0)	22.2 (8.7)	6.1 (2.4)	0.4 (0.2)	0 (0)	0 (0)	0 (0)	0 (0)	0 (0)	1.2 (0.5)	22.8 (9.0)	42.4 (16.7)	127.9 (50.4)
Source: Environment Canada

== Recreation ==
Coldstream is home to Kal Beach, which is located on the shore of Kalamalka Lake. Smaller beaches in the area include Kirkland Beach, Juniper Beach, Tamarack Beach, Long Lake Beach, Jade Bay Beach, Cosens Beach, Pebble Beach, and Cliff Beach. Coldstream borders on Kalamalka Provincial Park, which features numerous groomed hiking trails, scenic views, and natural areas. Wildlife in the park includes black bear, whitetailed deer, rattlesnake, marmot, and other creatures. The Silver Star Mountain Resort, 29 km (18 mi) northeast of Coldstream, offers various options for winter sports.
