= School District 22 Vernon =

School district in British Columbia, Canada

- School District 22 Vernon Logo

Location
- Vernon Vernon, Lumby, Coldstream, Cherryville in Okanagan/Mainline Canada

District information
- Superintendent: Dr. Christine Perkins
- Schools: 27
- Budget: CA$90 million

Students and staff
- Students: 8,200
- Teachers: 700

Other information
- Website: www.sd22.bc.ca

School District 22 Vernon is a school district in Okanagan region of British Columbia. It includes schools in Vernon, Lumby and Coldstream.

== Schools ==
School	Location	Grades	School Website
Alexis Park Elementary School	Vernon	K-7	Website
BX Elementary School	Vernon	K-7	Website
Beairsto Elementary School	Vernon	K-7	Website
Charles Bloom Secondary School	Lumby	7-12	Website
Cherryville Elementary School	Cherryville	K-6	Website
Clarence Fulton Secondary School	Vernon	8-12	Website
Coldstream Elementary School	Coldstream	K-7	Website
Crossroads Alternate School	Lumby	10-12	Website
Ellison Elementary School	Vernon	K-7	Website
Harwood Elementary School	Vernon	K-7	Website
Hillview Elementary School	Vernon	K-7	Website
J W Inglis Elementary School	Lumby	K-6	Website
Kalamalka Secondary School	Coldstream	8-12	Website
Kidston Elementary School	Coldstream	K-7	Website
Lavington Elementary School	Coldstream	K-7	Website
Mission Hill Elementary School	Vernon	K-7	Website
Okanagan Landing Elementary School	Vernon	K-7	Website
Open Door School	Vernon	9-12	Website
Silver Star Elementary School	Vernon	K-7	Website
Vernon Alternate	Vernon	8-10	Website
vLearn	Vernon	K-12	Website
Vernon Secondary School	Vernon	8-12	Website
W L Seaton Secondary School	Vernon	8-12	Website

== See also ==
- List of school districts in British Columbia
