= Lumby, British Columbia =

Lumby
- Village
- The Corporation Of Lumby
- Motto: De porta usque ad Monashee (The Gateway to the Monashee)
- Location of Lumby Lumby (Canada)
- Coordinates: 50°14′58″N 118°57′56″W
- Country: Canada
- Province: British Columbia
- Regional district: North Okanagan
- Incorporated (Village): 1956

Government
  - Mayor: Various Acting
  - Councillor: Geoff Bevan
  - Councillor: Sherry Kineshanko
  - Councillor: Lori Mindnich
  - Councillor: Randal Ostafichuk

Area
  - Village: 5.27 km^{2} (2.03 sq mi)
- Elevation: 500 m (1,600 ft)

Population (2019)
  - Village: 2,000
  - Urban: 3,500
- Time zone: UTC−07:00 (PT)
- Postal code span: V0E
- Area code: 250 / 778 / 236
- Highways: Highway 6
- Website: Official website

Lumby is a village located near the edge of the Monashee Mountains in the North Okanagan of British Columbia, Canada.

The area is home to approximately 2,000 people, and its economy revolves around the agriculture and manufacturing sectors. Major employers in Lumby include forestry companies such as Tolko Industries and many organizations providing social services such as the local government, school district, and healthcare facilities.

== History ==
Lumby was originally known as White Valley, however it was renamed to honour Moses Lumby (1842–93) following his death in 1893. He had a varied career throughout his life, including serving as a government agent in Vernon, British Columbia and Vice-President of the Shuswap and Okanagan Railway.

The community was previously home to the Lumby Fighting Saints of the now defunct WHA Junior West Hockey League. The league was founded in 2006, but disbanded shortly after in 2008.

On October 8, 2014, a WWII-era Japanese balloon bomb was discovered by forestry workers in the mountains near Lumby, nearly 70 years after it was launched. The bomb was reported to the RCMP, who disposed of the device on site using explosives due to risks of relocation.

== Features and amenities ==
The village is home to a network of trails along the nearby creek beds, known collectively as the Salmon Trail.

Hang gliding and paragliding are popular in Lumby. The village has hosted many national and international events, usually taking place at Cooper Mountain.

The village also hosts a winter outhouse race for charity, featuring creative entries of outhouses mounted on skis.

The "Lumby Days" family fair takes place annually in the beginning of summer, attracting attendees from across the Okanagan Valley.

== Education ==
Education in Lumby is administered by School District 22 Vernon, which operates 3 schools in the village: Charles Bloom Secondary School, Crossroads Alternate School, and J.W. Inglis Elementary School.

== Demographics ==
In the 2021 Census of Population conducted by Statistics Canada, Lumby had a population of 2,063 living in 836 of its 861 total private dwellings, a change of 12.5% from its 2016 population of 1,833. With a land area of 5.93 km^{2} (2.29 sq mi), it had a population density of 347.9/km^{2} (901.0/sq mi) in 2021.

=== Religion ===
According to the 2021 census, religious groups in Lumby included:

- Irreligion (1,325 persons or 65.8%)
- Christianity (670 persons or 33.3%)
- Buddhism (10 persons or 0.5%)
- Other (20 persons or 1.0%)

=== Government ===
1st/3rd Mayor: Neville Ross Duke (1956-1960) 1st term
2nd Mayor: James Wilson Inglis (1961-1963)
1st/3rd Mayor: Neville Ross Duke (1964-1985) 2nd term
4th Mayor: Dave Simpson (1986-1992)
5th Mayor: Joanne Kineshanko (1992-2002)
6th Mayor: Eric Foster (2002-2009)
7th Mayor: Kevin Acton (2009-2026)
8th Mayor: To Be Determined; 2027 by-election

== Climate ==
Lumby has a humid continental climate with hot summers days and cool nights. Spring and fall are the driest seasons, and summer and winter are the wettest seasons. Fog often sets in during the winter, and can last for days at a time. Lumby is wetter and cooler than Vernon, but is still dry enough to contain natural grasslands, especially on south facing slopes.

During the summer months, Lumby has one of the highest diurnal temperature variations in Canada. The daily temperature swing of 20.1 °C (36.2 °F) in August is only exceeded by Beaverdell.

Lumby is at a transition point between the semi-arid dry belt to the west and the interior rainforest to the east. Thus, both wet and dry vegetation are common in Lumby.

Weather facts:

- Driest Year (1967) = 318 mm (13 in)
- Wettest Year (1982) = 788 mm (31 in)
- Warmest Year (1998) = 8.2 °C (47 °F)
- Coldest Year (1996) = 4.8 °C (41 °F)

Climate data for Lumby
Month	Jan	Feb	Mar	Apr	May	Jun	Jul	Aug	Sep	Oct	Nov	Dec	Year
Record high °C (°F)	11.7 (53.1)	12.2 (54.0)	22.2 (72.0)	27.5 (81.5)	33.0 (91.4)	37.0 (98.6)	39.0 (102.2)	39.0 (102.2)	35.5 (95.9)	25.0 (77.0)	16.5 (61.7)	10.0 (50.0)	39.0 (102.2)
Mean daily maximum °C (°F)	−1.2 (29.8)	2.8 (37.0)	8.3 (46.9)	15.3 (59.5)	19.4 (66.9)	23.4 (74.1)	28.0 (82.4)	27.5 (81.5)	21.7 (71.1)	12.4 (54.3)	4.2 (39.6)	−0.6 (30.9)	13.4 (56.1)
Daily mean °C (°F)	−4.8 (23.4)	−2.6 (27.3)	2.7 (36.9)	7.7 (45.9)	11.6 (52.9)	15.4 (59.7)	18.4 (65.1)	17.5 (63.5)	12.9 (55.2)	6.2 (43.2)	0.5 (32.9)	−4.4 (24.1)	6.8 (44.2)
Mean daily minimum °C (°F)	−8.4 (16.9)	−7.9 (17.8)	−3.0 (26.6)	0.1 (32.2)	3.8 (38.8)	7.3 (45.1)	8.7 (47.7)	7.4 (45.3)	4.1 (39.4)	−0.1 (31.8)	−3.2 (26.2)	−8.1 (17.4)	0.1 (32.2)
Record low °C (°F)	−38.5 (−37.3)	−34.0 (−29.2)	−25.6 (−14.1)	−11.1 (12.0)	−5.0 (23.0)	−1.7 (28.9)	0.0 (32.0)	−1.5 (29.3)	−6.0 (21.2)	−12.5 (9.5)	−28.5 (−19.3)	−32.8 (−27.0)	−38.5 (−37.3)
Average precipitation mm (inches)	52.7 (2.07)	22.1 (0.87)	28.5 (1.12)	27.9 (1.10)	56.0 (2.20)	59.3 (2.33)	35.9 (1.41)	34.5 (1.36)	44.2 (1.74)	47.0 (1.85)	54.3 (2.14)	46.3 (1.82)	508.7 (20.03)
Average rainfall mm (inches)	9.2 (0.36)	8.8 (0.35)	17.5 (0.69)	25.8 (1.02)	55.9 (2.20)	59.3 (2.33)	35.9 (1.41)	34.5 (1.36)	44.2 (1.74)	46.2 (1.82)	29.5 (1.16)	6.9 (0.27)	373.7 (14.71)
Average snowfall cm (inches)	43.5 (17.1)	13.3 (5.2)	11.0 (4.3)	2.1 (0.8)	0.2 (0.1)	0.0 (0.0)	0.0 (0.0)	0.0 (0.0)	0.0 (0.0)	0.8 (0.3)	24.7 (9.7)	39.4 (15.5)	135.0 (53.1)
Average precipitation days (≥ 0.2 mm)	16.9	10.0	14.3	12.2	15.8	14.9	9.0	9.1	10.9	15.1	15.9	14.8	158.8
Average rainy days (≥ 0.2 mm)	5.4	4.8	10.3	11.7	15.8	14.9	9.0	9.1	10.9	14.9	10.8	3.8	121.4
Average snowy days (≥ 0.2 cm)	12.8	6.4	5.1	0.7	0.3	0.0	0.0	0.0	0.0	0.3	6.8	11.7	44.1
