= Vernon, British Columbia =

Vernon
- City
- City of Vernon
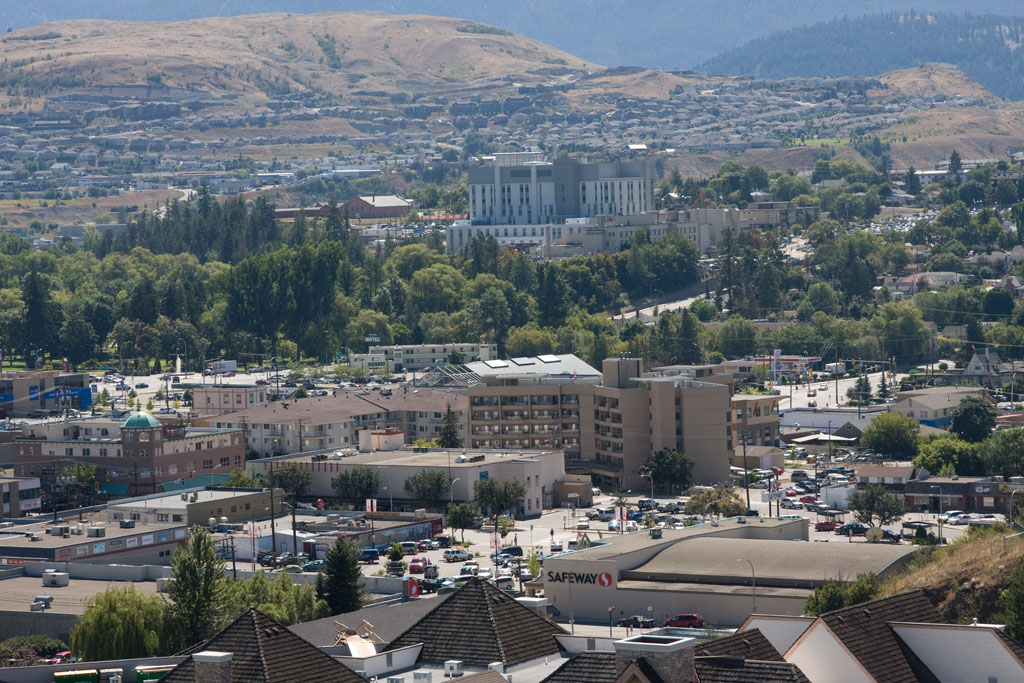
- Downtown Vernon in 2011

- Flag Logo

- Location of Vernon Vernon (Canada)
- Coordinates: 50°16′00″N 119°16′18″W
- Country: Canada
- Province: British Columbia
- Regional District: North Okanagan
- Incorporated: 30 December 1892

Government
  - Type: Elected city council
  - Mayor: Kari Gares
  - Governing Body: Vernon City Council
  - MP: Scott Anderson (CPC)
  - MLA: Kevin Acton (CPBC)

Area
  - City: 95.76 km^{2} (36.97 sq mi)
  - Metro: 1,040.82 km^{2} (401.86 sq mi)
- Elevation: 380 m (1,250 ft)

Population (2021)
  - City: 44,519
  - Density: 461.7/km^{2} (1,196/sq mi)
  - Urban: 51,896
  - Metro: 67,086
  - Metro density: 64.4/km^{2} (167/sq mi)
- Population counts are taken from the 2021 Canadian census.
- Time zone: UTC−07:00 (PT)
- Forward sortation area: V1B, V1H, V1T
- Area codes: 250, 778, 236, 672
- Highways: Highway 97; Highway 97A; Highway 6
- Website: vernon.ca

Vernon is a city in British Columbia, Canada. It is 440 km (270 mi) northeast of Vancouver. Named after Forbes George Vernon, a former MLA of British Columbia who helped establish the Coldstream Ranch in nearby Coldstream, Vernon was incorporated in 1892. Vernon has a population of 44,519 (2021), while its metropolitan region, Greater Vernon, has a population of 67,086 as of the 2021 Canadian census. With this population, Vernon is the largest city in the North Okanagan Regional District. A resident of Vernon is called a "Vernonite."

== History ==
The site of the city was discovered by the Okanagan people, a tribe of the Interior Salish people, who initially named the community Nintle Moos Chin, meaning "jumping over place where the creek narrows." This name refers to a section of the Swan Lake that passes through Downtown Vernon, the community's central business district. Some of these were part of the Okanagan Indian Band, a First Nations government part of the Okanagan Nation Alliance. This was followed by Priest's Valley, which serves as an Indigenous reserve, and its present name, in honour of Forbes George Vernon, a pioneer member part of the Legislative Assembly of British Columbia for Yale. The Okanagan people settled around the city's two lakes, Okanagan Lake and Swan Lake, obtaining seasonal sources of food. In that same decade, a section of a road near Fort Kamloops became its first road. Pleasant Valley Road, north of that street, was also historically developed.

In 1811, fur traders began travelling around the area. After one of these, David Stuart, began working with the Pacific Fur Company, which was bought out by the North West Company; Luc Girouard became the first white settler. However, the North West Company was forced to merge with the Hudson's Bay Company in 1821. Fur traders decided to camp in Vernon, which started to develop in 1863, following a gold discovery at the Cherry Creek, Monashee Mountains, Mission Creek and the east side of Okanagan Lake. After the development began, numerous ranches were constructed. Centreville, the community's original central business district, was formed in 1885. That same year, a post office, hotel, general store, and school house was constructed. A Hudson's Bay Company store was established in 1887, in a rough wooden structure. Historically a major economic hub destination in the Okanagan, Vernon was home to many cattle ranches and fruit orchard areas, attracting British families.

Vernon's growth accelerated beginning in 1891, after the Canadian Pacific Railway was opened in the Okanagan and Shuswap regions of the British Columbia Interior, connecting in Sicamous, a town in the Shuswap area; services by this railway were offered to Vernon by 1891, in addition to its neighbourhood of Okanagan Landing. Shortly after, the sternwheeler S.S. Aberdeen was launched by the Canadian Pacific Railway for use on Okanagan Lake in 1893 connecting Vernon to Penticton at the south end of Okanagan Lake, and points between. Fruit trees were planted in Vernon, which first grew by the early 1890s, while water supplies were shipped to the community by canal in 1906 for use at local orchard or farm areas. In 1908, the Okanagan Mounted Rifles military program was formed in it, thus bringing a number of people to the area during World War I and World War II for lessons.

Vernon was incorporated as a city on 30 December 1892, with a city hall formed in 1903 for the governing body, which included a fire hall and a public reading space. The following year, it was declared the largest municipality in the Okanagan and first of which to contain a bank and telephone. As population expanded, more services were made available at Vernon, while its city centre switched from Coldstream Road to 30th Avenue. A school and Vernon Jubilee Hospital were public services made available in 1909. Despite a growth drop during World War I, citizens voted to open a new high school, sports stadium, and, later, a shopping mall, Village Green Centre, and library, in the city.

== Transportation ==
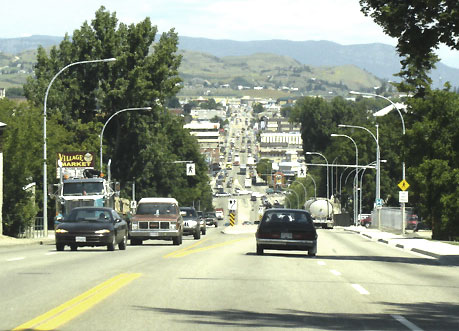
View of downtown Vernon from the Hospital Hill

Three provincial highways connect Vernon: Highway 97 which connects north–south (south to Kelowna, north to Kamloops); Highway 97A which begins in Vernon, and goes north to Armstrong and Enderby; and Highway 6 which ends in Vernon running east–west to Lumby. In recent years, each of these highways has undergone major renovations, including a new $22-million interchange system and four lane expansion at the Highway 97 and Highway 6 junction.

The City of Vernon, in conjunction with the District of Coldstream and the North Okanagan Regional District, operates Vernon Regional Transit through BC Transit. This transit system is responsible for all local full-service and handyDART public bus transportation. Ebus, a sister brand for the luxury transportation company Red Arrow, also serves Vernon for out-of-town destinations from their downtown bus terminal.

Vernon is served by the Vernon Regional Airport (IATA: YVE, ICAO: CYVK) in the Okanagan Landing area. The airport has no scheduled air service, and is primarily used by civilian aircraft. The Greater Vernon area is also served by Kelowna International Airport, located approximately 40 kilometres (about a 30 to 40 minute drive) south on Hwy 97. Numerous airlines provide scheduled passenger and cargo services to points throughout British Columbia and Alberta, and areas beyond such as Toronto and Seattle.

== Climate ==
Vernon has a humid continental climate (Koppen: Dfb) with warm, sometimes hot summers and cold winters with highs around freezing, though mild by Canadian standards. Precipitation is well-distributed year-round.

Climate data for Vernon (1991–2020, Extremes 1900–2020)
| Month | Jan | Feb | Mar | Apr | May | Jun | Jul | Aug | Sep | Oct | Nov | Dec | Year |
|---|---|---|---|---|---|---|---|---|---|---|---|---|---|
| Record high humidex | 10.0 | 13.2 | 20.6 | 28.5 | 33.8 | 41.9 | 42.0 | 40.8 | 37.6 | 26.9 | 16.4 | 13.3 | 42.0 |
| Record high °C (°F) | 14.5 (58.1) | 13.9 (57.0) | 21.0 (69.8) | 29.4 (84.9) | 34.5 (94.1) | 39.3 (102.7) | 40.0 (104.0) | 38.8 (101.8) | 35.4 (95.7) | 26.7 (80.1) | 18.9 (66.0) | 15.0 (59.0) | 40.0 (104.0) |
| Mean daily maximum °C (°F) | −0.5 (31.1) | 2.8 (37.0) | 9.0 (48.2) | 15.1 (59.2) | 20.9 (69.6) | 23.8 (74.8) | 28.4 (83.1) | 27.9 (82.2) | 21.7 (71.1) | 12.4 (54.3) | 4.5 (40.1) | −0.2 (31.6) | 13.8 (56.8) |
| Daily mean °C (°F) | −3.5 (25.7) | −1.1 (30.0) | 3.9 (39.0) | 8.7 (47.7) | 13.9 (57.0) | 17.0 (62.6) | 20.6 (69.1) | 20.0 (68.0) | 15.0 (59.0) | 7.6 (45.7) | 1.4 (34.5) | −3.0 (26.6) | 8.4 (47.1) |
| Mean daily minimum °C (°F) | −6.4 (20.5) | −5.0 (23.0) | −1.2 (29.8) | 2.3 (36.1) | 6.8 (44.2) | 10.2 (50.4) | 12.7 (54.9) | 12.1 (53.8) | 8.2 (46.8) | 2.9 (37.2) | −1.8 (28.8) | −5.8 (21.6) | 2.9 (37.2) |
| Record low °C (°F) | −35.6 (−32.1) | −36.1 (−33.0) | −28.9 (−20.0) | −10.6 (12.9) | −5.0 (23.0) | 0.0 (32.0) | 3.3 (37.9) | −1.7 (28.9) | −5.0 (23.0) | −20.5 (−4.9) | −32.0 (−25.6) | −38.9 (−38.0) | −38.9 (−38.0) |
| Record low wind chill | −35.4 | −29.0 | −26.5 | −10.9 | −5.2 | 0.0 | 0.0 | 0.0 | −3.9 | −12.1 | −32.7 | −36.9 | −36.9 |
| Average precipitation mm (inches) | 37.1 (1.46) | 25.0 (0.98) | 24.6 (0.97) | 25.7 (1.01) | 44.7 (1.76) | 54.7 (2.15) | 36.8 (1.45) | 30.3 (1.19) | 33.5 (1.32) | 40.8 (1.61) | 49.3 (1.94) | 44.1 (1.74) | 446.5 (17.58) |
| Average rainfall mm (inches) | 14.6 (0.57) | 14.8 (0.58) | 16.9 (0.67) | 27.0 (1.06) | 39.9 (1.57) | 45.8 (1.80) | 34.4 (1.35) | 29.2 (1.15) | 33.0 (1.30) | 37.0 (1.46) | 34.1 (1.34) | 14.1 (0.56) | 340.8 (13.42) |
| Average snowfall cm (inches) | 28.2 (11.1) | 9.0 (3.5) | 6.2 (2.4) | 0.4 (0.2) | 0.0 (0.0) | 0.0 (0.0) | 0.0 (0.0) | 0.0 (0.0) | 0.0 (0.0) | 0.0 (0.0) | 18.2 (7.2) | 30.8 (12.1) | 92.8 (36.5) |
| Average precipitation days (≥ 0.2 mm) | 13.9 | 11.0 | 11.0 | 10.9 | 12.4 | 13.2 | 9.6 | 9.3 | 10.0 | 14.7 | 16.8 | 15.4 | 148.1 |
| Average rainy days (≥ 0.2 mm) | 5.2 | 5.1 | 6.6 | 8.7 | 10.2 | 10.9 | 6.8 | 6.6 | 7.2 | 10.3 | 9.9 | 4.7 | 92.3 |
| Average snowy days (≥ 0.2 cm) | 8.1 | 3.5 | 2.0 | 0.19 | 0.0 | 0.0 | 0.0 | 0.0 | 0.0 | 0.0 | 3.7 | 8.3 | 25.8 |
| Average relative humidity (%) | 84.8 | 71.1 | 53.7 | 41.7 | 43.0 | 45.0 | 36.1 | 35.6 | 46.2 | 62.8 | 78.3 | 84.0 | 56.9 |
Source: Environment Canada

== Demographics ==
Historical population
| Year | Pop. | ±% |
|---|---|---|
| 1891 | 600 | — |
| 1901 | 802 | +33.7% |
| 1911 | 2,371 | +195.6% |
| 1921 | 3,685 | +55.4% |
| 1931 | 3,937 | +6.8% |
| 1941 | 5,209 | +32.3% |
| 1951 | 7,822 | +50.2% |
| 1956 | 8,998 | +15.0% |
| 1961 | 10,250 | +13.9% |
| 1966 | 11,423 | +11.4% |
| 1971 | 13,283 | +16.3% |
| 1976 | 17,546 | +32.1% |
| 1981 | 19,987 | +13.9% |
| 1986 | 20,241 | +1.3% |
| 1991 | 23,514 | +16.2% |
| 1996 | 31,817 | +35.3% |
| 2001 | 33,494 | +5.3% |
| 2006 | 35,944 | +7.3% |
| 2011 | 38,180 | +6.2% |
| 2016 | 40,116 | +5.1% |
| 2021 | 44,519 | +11.0% |
Sources: Statistics Canada

In the 2021 Census of Population conducted by Statistics Canada, Vernon had a population of 44,519 living in 19,776 of its 21,287 total private dwellings, a change of 11% from its 2016 population of 40,116. With a land area of 96.43 km^{2} (37.23 sq mi), it had a population density of 461.7/km^{2} (1,195.7/sq mi) in 2021.

In 2016, the median age was 48.4, higher than the national median age of 41.2. 25.5% of residents were age 65 or older. The median income before tax was $31,455. The median value of a dwelling was $349,932.

=== Ethnicity ===
According to the 2021 census, 84.7% of Vernon residents are white, 8.0% are visible minorities, and 7.3% are Indigenous. The largest visible minority groups are South Asian (2.4%), Filipino (1.1%), Chinese (1.0%), and Japanese (0.8%).

Panethnic groups in the City of Vernon (2001−2021)
| Panethnic group | 2021 | | 2016 | | 2011 | | 2006 | | 2001 | |
| Panethnic group | Pop. | % | Pop. | % | Pop. | % | Pop. | % | Pop. | % |
|---|---|---|---|---|---|---|---|---|---|---|
| European (Note: Statistic includes all persons that did not make up part of a visible minority or an indigenous identity.) | 36,495 | 84.66% | 33,625 | 86.61% | 32,570 | 89.27% | 31,620 | 89.97% | 29,815 | 90.57% |
| Indigenous | 3,150 | 7.31% | 2,795 | 7.2% | 2,415 | 6.62% | 1,920 | 5.46% | 1,295 | 3.93% |
| South Asian | 1,040 | 2.41% | 730 | 1.88% | 340 | 0.93% | 710 | 2.02% | 980 | 2.98% |
| East Asian (Note: Statistic includes total responses of "Chinese," "Korean," and "Japanese" under visible minority section on census.) | 845 | 1.96% | 730 | 1.88% | 565 | 1.55% | 515 | 1.47% | 540 | 1.64% |
| Southeast Asian (Note: Statistic includes total responses of "Filipino" and "Southeast Asian" under visible minority section on census.) | 725 | 1.68% | 520 | 1.34% | 225 | 0.62% | 115 | 0.33% | 130 | 0.39% |
| African | 305 | 0.71% | 105 | 0.27% | 120 | 0.33% | 125 | 0.36% | 55 | 0.17% |
| Latin American | 205 | 0.48% | 155 | 0.4% | 125 | 0.34% | 60 | 0.17% | 40 | 0.12% |
| Middle Eastern (Note: Statistic includes total responses of "West Asian" and "Arab" under visible minority section on census.) | 190 | 0.44% | 120 | 0.31% | 40 | 0.11% | 60 | 0.17% | 45 | 0.14% |
| Other/multiracial (Note: Statistic includes total responses of "Visible minority, n.i.e." and "Multiple visible minorities" under visible minority section on census.) | 155 | 0.36% | 55 | 0.14% | 60 | 0.16% | 10 | 0.03% | 35 | 0.11% |
| Total responses | 43,110 | 96.84% | 38,825 | 96.78% | 36,485 | 95.64% | 35,145 | 97.78% | 32,920 | 98.29% |
| Total population | 44,519 | 100% | 40,116 | 100% | 38,150 | 100% | 35,944 | 100% | 33,494 | 100% |
Note: Totals greater than 100% due to multiple origin responses.

=== Language ===
The 2021 census reported that 87.2% of residents claim English as their first language. Other common first languages are German (2.1%), French (1.2%), Punjabi (1.2%), and Russian and Tagalog (0.7% each).

=== Religion ===
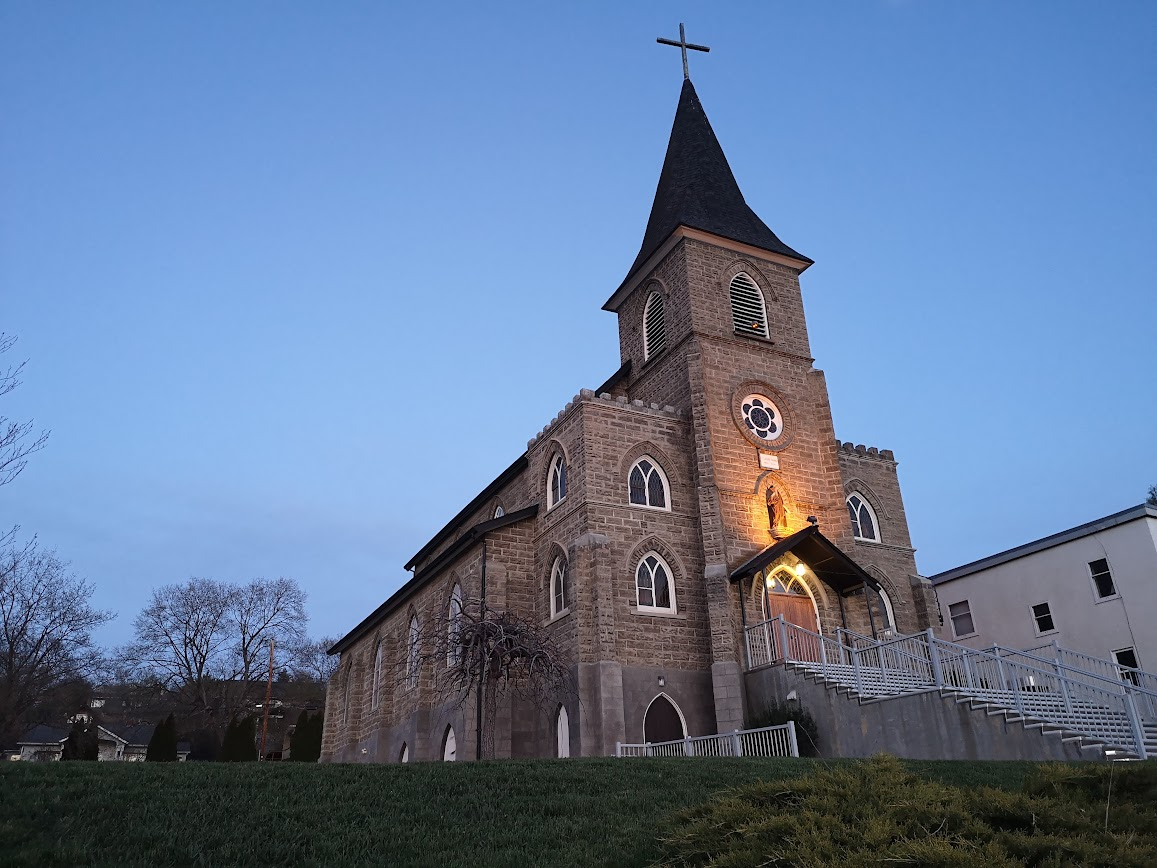
St. James Catholic Church. Built between 1908 and 1910.

According to the 2021 census, religious groups in Vernon included:

- Irreligion (23,755 persons or 55.1%)
- Christianity (17,585 persons or 40.8%)
- Islam (395 persons or 0.9%)
- Sikhism (335 persons or 0.8%)
- Hinduism (230 persons or 0.5%)
- Buddhism (210 persons or 0.5%)
- Judaism (90 persons or 0.2%)
- Indigenous Spirituality (25 persons or 0.1%)

Religious groups in Vernon (1991–2021)
| Religious group | 2021 | | 2011 | | 2001 | | 1991 | |
| Religious group | Pop. | % | Pop. | % | Pop. | % | Pop. | % |
|---|---|---|---|---|---|---|---|---|
| Christian | 17,585 | 40.79% | 18,675 | 51.18% | 20,225 | 61.44% | 16,525 | 71.97% |
| Muslim | 395 | 0.92% | 145 | 0.4% | 180 | 0.55% | 0 | 0% |
| Sikh | 335 | 0.78% | 175 | 0.48% | 425 | 1.29% | 290 | 1.26% |
| Hindu | 230 | 0.53% | 60 | 0.16% | 240 | 0.73% | 15 | 0.07% |
| Buddhist | 210 | 0.49% | 335 | 0.92% | 175 | 0.53% | 115 | 0.5% |
| Jewish | 90 | 0.21% | 35 | 0.1% | 95 | 0.29% | 0 | 0% |
| Indigenous spirituality | 25 | 0.06% | 35 | 0.1% | N/A | N/A | N/A | N/A |
| Other religion | 490 | 1.14% | 410 | 1.12% | 155 | 0.47% | 60 | 0.26% |
| Irreligious | 23,755 | 55.1% | 16,610 | 45.52% | 11,425 | 34.71% | 5,950 | 25.91% |
| Total responses | 43,110 | 96.84% | 36,490 | 95.65% | 32,920 | 98.29% | 22,960 | 97.64% |

== Education ==
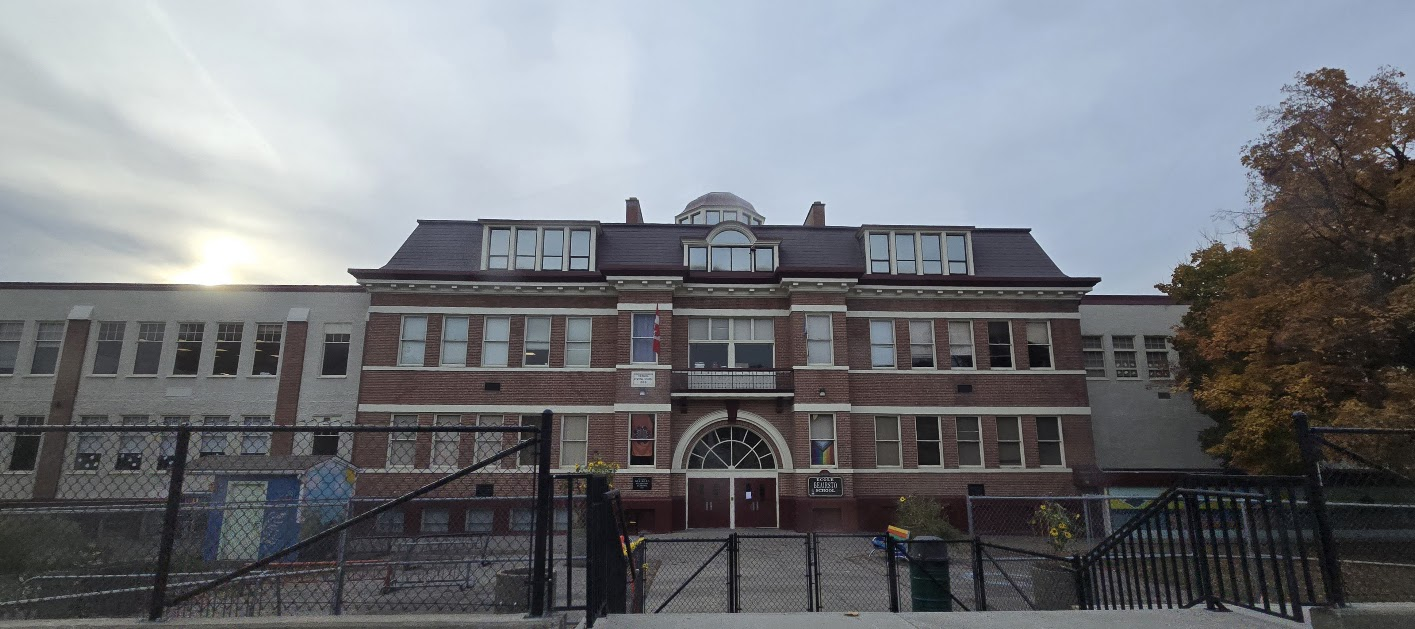
Beairsto Elementary (originally called Central) in Vernon BC. Built in 1909

Vernon is served by School District 22 Vernon, a school district that includes 14 elementary schools and five high schools. The high schools are: Vernon Secondary School, Kalamalka High School, Clarence Fulton High School, W.L. Seaton Secondary, and Charles Bloom Secondary. Vernon Secondary School (VSS) is in the neighbourhood of East Hill. This building was renovated in the early 21st century to give the students a new and better learning environment. Kalamalka Secondary School, otherwise known as Kal, is in the neighbouring municipality of Coldstream which is near Kalamalka Lake. It is also below Middleton Mountain, a prominent landmark in Coldstream. Fulton Secondary School is near the airport in South Vernon. Seaton High School, also known as Seaton, is located directly off 27th Street which merges into Highway 97. Charles Bloom Secondary is in the town of Lumby, which is about 20 minutes East of Vernon on Highway 6. Competitions are common among the schools, with all of them taking part in annual grad pranks as well as healthy sports competitions. Vernon is home to few independent schools such as the Vernon Christian School, which has both an elementary (preschool-grade 6) and secondary campus with a middle school (grades 7–9) and high school (grades 10–12). For post-secondary education, Vernon is home to Okanagan College, a multi-campus full degree granting college. Many summer courses and yearly courses are offered there. Other smaller community and specialty colleges exist within Vernon.

== Arts and culture ==
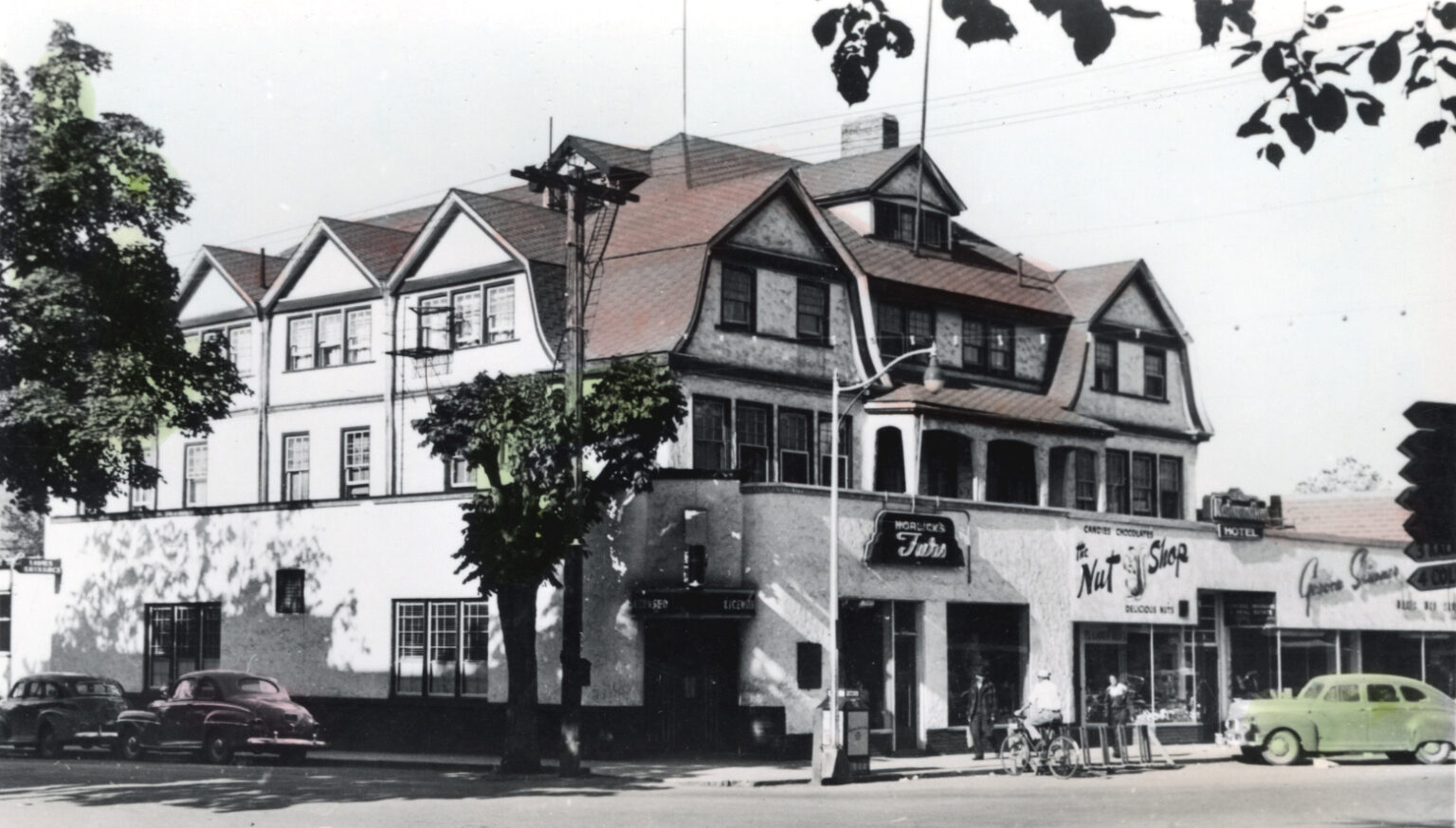
The long-lost Pine Tree Nut Shop, a chocolatier, renowned locally in 1947.

Each winter, Vernon plays host to the Vernon Winter Carnival. First held in 1961, it is now Western Canada's largest and North America's second largest Winter Carnival.

Sunshine festival is an annual event held in the Downtown core of Vernon. This event features live music, artisan booths, community program booths, food trucks, and children's entertainment.

Vernon is also home to the Vernon and District Performing Arts Centre. The society presents three series of entertainment including dance, theatre, and child oriented. The performing arts centre also hosts hundreds of touring musical acts, local talent and community based events.

The Powerhouse Theatre is housed in a former power station in the city. The Powerhouse Theatre's theatrical society operates seasonally and relies on volunteers.

Vernon's Towne Cinema is the home of The Vernon Film Society and is a classic example of a 1930s Art Deco style theatre. Built in 1929–30, the Towne Cinema began its life as The National Ball Room, presenting live entertainment on stage, hosting banquets and stage plays. It was the main venue in Vernon for entertaining the troops during the Second World War and was heavily involved in selling war bonds and the collection of aluminum from its customers for the war effort. Children could bring an old aluminum pot or pan and receive a ticket for a free movie, the aluminum going towards the construction of war planes and other military materials so necessary for the achievement of victory over the Nazi regime of Adolf Hitler.

The Vernon Community Arts Centre (VCAC) is located in Polson Park. This community centre is a studio-based facility and is operated by the Arts Council of the North Okanagan. The VCAC offers year-round programming for youth and adults such as art classes and workshops, an artist in residence program and independent study sessions.

Every Summer in June, Vernon hosts the largest craft show in western Canada, called Creative Chaos. Artisans from across western Canada gather to sell their original handmade goods and services: jewellery, chocolates and candies, unique clothing, and other household items and/or decorations. A food fair and entertainment are also a feature of this craft fair. The fair usually lasts three days and many of the citizens of Vernon partake.

Vernon displays a variety of public art from murals to sculptures and mosaics. A collection of 28 heritage murals was created under the direction of lead artist Michelle Loughery. The mural project is in a continual state of growth, with new pieces of art being added at regular intervals. One of the most notable murals is a depiction of Sveva Caetani, daughter of Italian noble Leone Caetani. She was an Italian immigrant who survived captivity by her mother to become a famed artist and local art instructor.

In 2016, Canada's first inclusive memorial sculpture was installed on the grounds of Vernon Secondary School.

== Sports and recreation ==
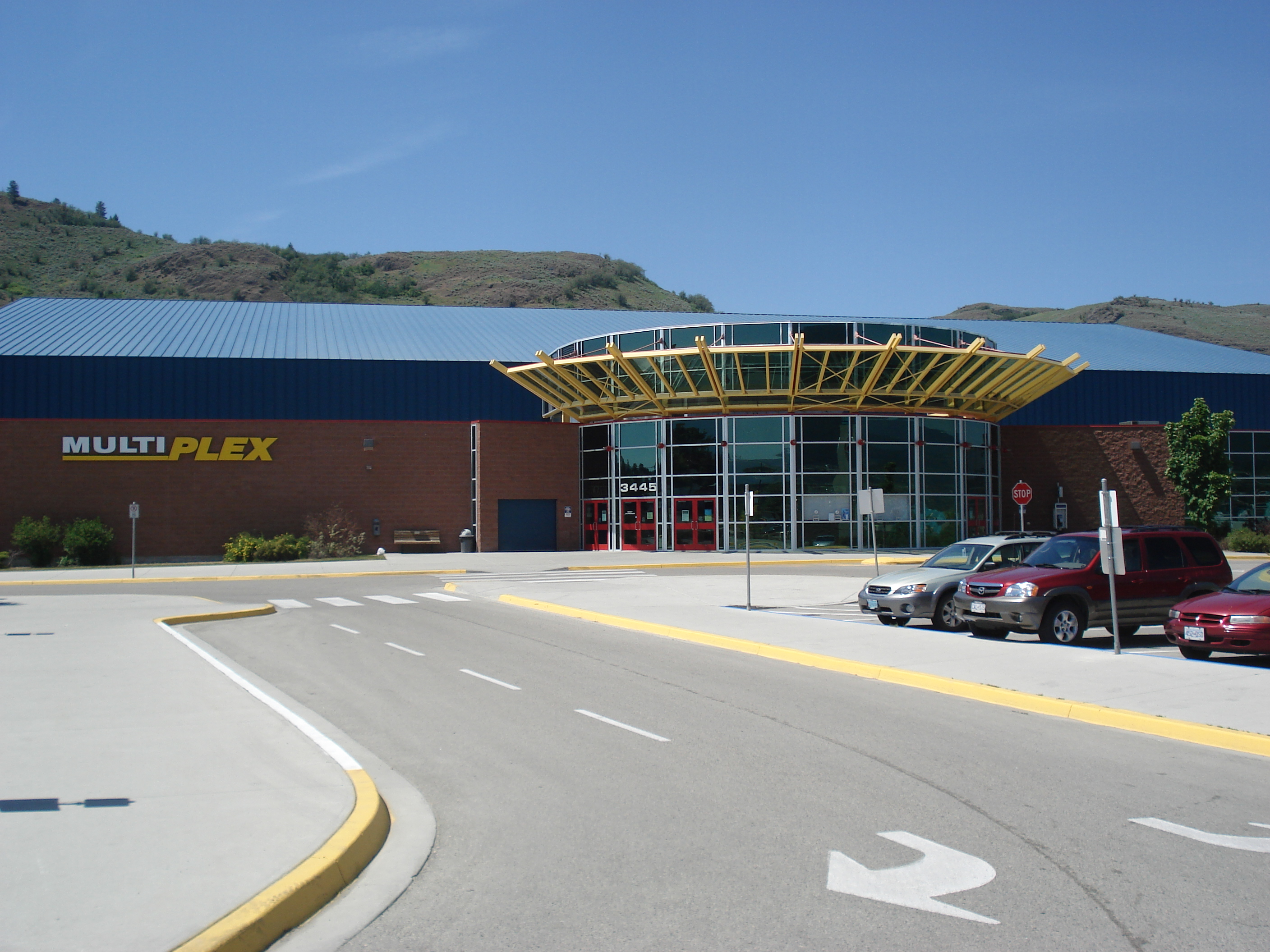
The Kal Tire Place (formerly the Vernon Multiplex), completed in 2001, is home to the Vernon Vipers. A second arena has been built in 2018, named the Kal Tire Place North

Vernon is known for its lakes and beaches in the summer, and skiing and hockey in the winter. It is therefore a year-round tourist destination and weekend getaway for people from Vancouver and Calgary. During the summer Vernon hosts a large slo-pitch tournament (Funtastic).

The Vernon area is home to several golf courses. Among these is the prestigious Predator Ridge Resort, a 36-hole golf resort and community. This resort is one of only two public golf courses in Western Canada to have been ranked by Score Magazine as one of the country's top 25 golf courses over the last 8 years. Predator Ridge Resort also hosted the Skins Game twice – first in 2000 featuring Fred Couples, Sergio García, Phil Mickelson, and Mike Weir, then in 2008 featuring Mike Weir, Fred Couples, Greg Norman, Colin Montgomerie and Camilo Villegas.

One of the most popular winter sports in Vernon is skiing. With two major ski locations nearby located in Regional District of North Okanagan Electoral Area C, each winter locals and tourists alike flock to Silver Star Mountain Resort and Sovereign Lake Nordic Club. Known as one of the top ski resorts in North America, Silver Star also has a large cross-country skiing area which hosted a 1991 FIS Cross-Country World Cup event. As another world-class ski area, Sovereign Lake is the region's premier cross-country skiing location with over 50 kilometers of skiing terrain. This Nordic Club gained worldwide exposure as the host of a 2005 FIS Cross-Country World Cup event.

Curling also has a strong following in Vernon, with local curlers being found at the Vernon Curling Club. In past years, the city has hosted several major national curling events, including the 1979 Canadian Senior Women's Curling Championship, the 1992 Canadian Junior Curling Championships, and the 2004 Canadian Senior Curling Championships. Its first international event, the 2008 Ford World Women's Curling Championship was held at the Vernon Multiplex.

Another popular sport in Vernon is tennis, with many courts in picturesque locations. The Vernon Tennis Association (VTA) was started in October 2008 to bring together tennis players of all skill levels within the Vernon area and to offer both competitive and social programs that are not being offered currently to players. Presently the VTA operates programs 15 hours per week in "partnership" with Greater Vernon Parks, Recreation and Culture.

A more recent sport with growing popularity is pickleball. The Vernon Pickleball Association was incorporated in 2014, and currently has more than 500 members. It recently spearheaded a campaign to construct a roof over its pickleball complex of 12 courts, which will facilitate year-round playing when it opens early 2021.

Kalamalka Beach (Kal Beach) is the most popular of many unique beaches in and around Vernon. A large pier built by a local service club is used for sunbathing and jumping. On summer evenings the beach is used extensively for beach volleyball. Kin Beach and Paddle Wheel Park Beach on Okanagan Lake are also among the twenty or so larger beaches in Vernon.

Vernon has several areas for mountain biking including Ellison Provincial Park, Kalamalka Lake Park, Sovereign Lake Provincial Park, Predator Ridge, and Silver Star Mountain.

Cougar Canyon is near Vernon, with both a popular rock climbing site and an ecological preserve. Another place for cliff jumpers and campers is Ellison Provincial Park, located about 15–20 minutes out of South Vernon.

The city is home to Splashdown Vernon.

Vernon has also seen success in junior hockey. The Vernon Vipers (formerly the Vernon Lakers) are one of the most decorated junior teams in Canadian history having won the Royal Bank Cup (formerly the Centennial Cup) six times, with four of those wins in the 1990s. They won while hosting the tournament in 1990, repeated in 1991, again in 1996, in 1999 and most recently won back-to-back championships in 2009 and 2010; giving arguably the most dominant performance of any franchise in a single decade since the introduction of the Centennial Cup in 1971. To date, the Vernon Vipers have won 4 Royal Bank Cups, 2 Centennial Cups, 4 Abbott Cups, 5 Doyle Cups, 8 Mowat Cups and 9 League Titles.

| Club | League | Sport | Established | Venue |
|---|---|---|---|---|
| Vernon Vipers | BCHL | Ice hockey | 1961 | Kal Tire Place |

The Vernon Tigers Junior B Lacrosse Club was established in 2000, coinciding with the inception of the Thompson Okanagan Junior Lacrosse League. Since that time, they have won three league titles and two provincial silver medals.

| Club | League | Sport | Established | Venue |
|---|---|---|---|---|
| Vernon Tigers | TOJLL | Lacrosse | 2000 | Kal Tire Place |

== Governance ==
Vernon is in the Vernon-Lumby provincial electoral district and the Vernon—Lake Country—Monashee national electoral district.

In 2019 Vernon city council decided to install free-standing toilets, which can be "used by all community members," with specific design features to prevent it being used inappropriately.

Council had originally considered purchasing a pair of "Portland loos," for $275,000. That design that had been installed in dozens of cities, but, due to the long waiting list, Vernon decided to commission a similar facility from local suppliers.

The local design was installed on time, and at a lower cost than that projected for the Portland Loo. However, it needed a bit of work, as it did not function on opening day. Like the Portland Loo, the toilet designed for Vernon is built from stainless steel and is painted with special paint designed to counter graffiti. Like the Portland Loo there is no washbasin inside, only a toilet, and a dispenser for waterless hand cleanser. Slats allow police enough visual access to confirm there is only one occupant.

Requests for new toilets were first brought to council by the Activate Safety Task Force, in 2018. Initially Vernon planned to leave the facility open 24 hours a day, as is done with almost every city that has installed a Portland Loo, but, in the end, Council decided the facility will only be open from 7am to 9pm.

If the new facility proves satisfactory, toilets like it will replace the public toilets near the city's bus station.

== Flag ==
The flag of Vernon was adopted in November 2010 after it had been flown in Afghanistan by Canadian Forces members, including Gareth Eley, a seaman from the city, who returned the flag when it was adopted. It was presented to the mayor at a service member flag program, Home Flags Project, by Eley, in addition to a number of other municipal flags, in Vernon at the Wesbild Centre sports stadium during Remembrance Day ceremonies. The mayor stated it displays the "rich" history of this city to the public.

Vernon City Council declared they would frame and display the flag at Vernon City Hall at this time. There is a crest and shield version of the flag of Vernon that is used occasionally; it was adopted shortly after the city was incorporated. The flag of Vernon represents the city itself and its region, the Okanagan, containing a "V" to note Vernon, an elk to represent the wildlife of the area, sheaves to suggest the importance of agriculture in the city, while its horn of plenty notes its fruit industry.

== Notable people ==
- Andrew Allen, singer-songwriter
- Alice Barrett Parke, diarist and pioneer
- Ed Bickert, jazz guitarist
- Eric Brewer, former ice hockey player NHL
- Leone Caetani, scholar of Islam, father of Sveva Caetani, spent the last years of his life in Vernon.
- Raquel Cole, country music singer, musician, and songwriter
- John Denison, ice road engineer who operated in the Northwest Territories in the 1950s-1970s.
- Josh Dueck, won both silver and gold medals at the Paralympic Games in Sochi, Russia, as well as a silver medal at the 2010 games in Vancouver.
- Andrew Ebbett, former professional ice hockey player for the Pittsburgh Penguins
- Lykele Faber, Dutch secret agent during World War II
- Tracy Garneau, Ultramarathon runner
- Sonja Gaudet Paralympic Curler, three-time gold medalist, Sonja Gaudet is the world's most decorated wheelchair curler.
- Eric Godard, professional hockey player for the Pittsburgh Penguins
- Leah Goldstein (born 1969), Canadian-Israeli professional road racing cyclist winner of the Race Across America, World Bantamweight Kickboxing Champion, and Israel Duathlon national champion
- James Green, professional football player for the Toronto Argonauts
- Kevin Hill, snowboarder.
- Aaron Hoffman (stage name SonReal), hip hop and alternative artist.
- Krista and Tatiana Hogan, craniopagus conjoined twins
- Ken Holland, former NHL player and general manager of the Edmonton Oilers and Detroit Red Wings
- Ryan Holmes, CEO of HootSuite
- Larry Kwong, first Chinese Canadian ice hockey player in the NHL
- Leonard Marchand, first Indigenous Member of Parliament and first Indigenous federal cabinet minister in Canada.
- Frederick McCall, WW1 Air Ace. McCall Field was the original name of the Calgary International Airport
- Zach McPhee, country music singer and songwriter, former junior hockey player
- Vasek Pospisil, tennis player, Wimbledon 2014 men's doubles champion
- Daniel Powter, singer-songwriter of US Billboard #1 hit song from 2005 Bad Day
- Laisha Rosnau, novelist and poet
- TJ Schiller, professional skier
- Jerred Smithson, professional hockey player for the Florida Panthers
- Raymond Wladichuk, professional football player for the Hamilton Tiger-Cats

== Sister cities ==
Vernon has "sister city" agreements with the following cities:

- Anandpur Sahib, India
- Frankenburg am Hausruck, Austria
- Modesto, United States
- Saint-Lambert, Canada
- Tavullia, Italy
- Tome, Japan

== Freedom of the City ==
The following people and military units have received the Freedom of the City award from Vernon.

=== Individuals ===
- Kenneth Mark Holland: 26 October 2021

=== Military units ===
- Vernon Army Cadet Summer Training Centre: 4 August 1979
- British Columbia Dragoons: 10 May 2008

== See also ==
- BX Falls
