= List of 1997 Seattle Mariners draft picks =

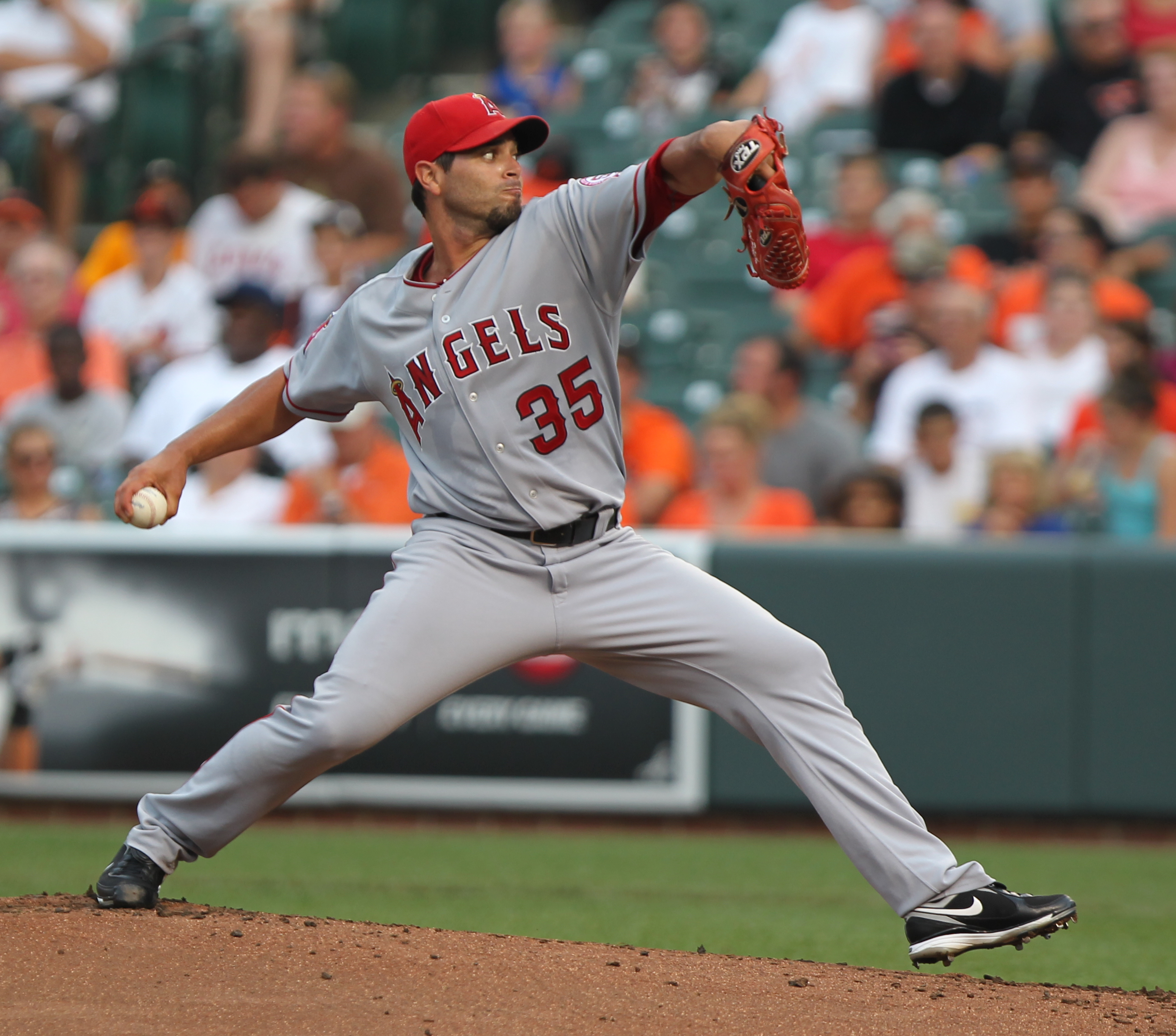
1997 Seattle Mariners draft picks
Joel Piñeiro (pictured) was the Mariners 12th round pick in 1997.
Information
Owner	Nintendo of America
General Manager(s)	Woody Woodward
Manager(s)	Lou Piniella
First pick	Ryan Anderson
Draft position	19th
Number of selections	62
Links
Results	Baseball-Reference
Official Site	The Official Site of the Seattle Mariners
Years	1996 • 1997 • 1998

The following is a list of 1997 Seattle Mariners draft picks. The Mariners took part in both the Rule 4 draft (June amateur draft) and the Rule 5 draft. The Mariners made 62 selections in the 1997 draft, the first being pitcher Ryan Anderson in the first round. In all, the Mariners selected 33 pitchers, 13 outfielders, 5 third basemen, 4 catchers, 4 shortstops, 2 second basemen, and 1 first baseman.

== Draft ==
=== Key ===
Round (Pick)	Indicates the round and pick the player was drafted
Position	Indicates the secondary/collegiate position at which the player was drafted, rather than the professional position the player may have gone on to play
**Bold**	Indicates the player signed with the Mariners
Italics	Indicates the player did not sign with the Mariners
*	Indicates the player made an appearance in Major League Baseball

=== Table ===
Round (Pick)	Name	Position	School	Source
1 (19)	**Ryan Anderson**	Left-handed pitcher	Divine Child High School	
2 (55)	**Brandon Parker**	Right-handed pitcher	University of Southern Mississippi	
2 (71)	Patrick Boyd	Outfielder	Clearwater Central Catholic High School	
3 (103)	**Pat Dunham**	Right-handed pitcher	Auburn University	
4 (133)	**Scott Prouty**	Right-handed pitcher	Pekin High School	
5 (163)	**Jermaine Clark**	Second baseman	University of San Francisco	
6 (193)	**Harvey Hargrove**	Second baseman	California State University, Sacramento	
7 (223)	**Sam Walton**	Left-handed pitcher	W. W. Samuell High School	
8 (253)	**Allan Simpson**	Right-handed pitcher	Taft College	
9 (283)	Frank Corr	Catcher	Father Lopez Catholic High School	
10 (313)	**Pete Duprey**	Left-handed pitcher	Forest High School	
11 (343)	**Cip Garcia**	Catcher	La Cueva High School	
12 (373)	**Joel Piñeiro**	Right-handed pitcher	Edison State College	
13 (403)	**Bret Soverel**	Right-handed pitcher	Florida International University	
14 (433)	Peter Bauer	Right-handed pitcher	Paint Branch High School	
15 (463)	**Richard Sundstrom**	Right-handed pitcher	Cypress College	
16 (493)	**Danny Delgado**	Right-handed pitcher	Monsignor Edward Pace High School	
17 (523)	**Clint Chrysler**	Left-handed pitcher	Stetson University	
18 (553)	**Ryan Oase**	Right-handed pitcher	Edmonds Community College	
19 (583)	**Jamie Clark**	Outfielder	Brandon High School	
20 (613)	**Mike Marchiano**	Outfielder	Fordham University	
21 (643)	**Emmanuel Ulloa**	Right-handed pitcher	George Washington High School	
22 (673)	**Hubert Parker**	Shortstop	Eisenhower High School	
23 (703)	Jim Abbott	Right-handed pitcher	Caledonia High School	
24 (733)	Jason Farren	Right-handed pitcher	Karns City High School	
25 (763)	**Ryan Reynolds**	Third baseman	The Woodlands High School	
26 (793)	**Glenn Murphy**	Left-handed pitcher	Madison County High School	
27 (823)	**John Gabaldon**	Right-handed pitcher	La Cueva High School	
28 (853)	Kirk Bolling	Right-handed pitcher	Saddleback College	
29 (883)	Matt Huntingford	Outfielder	West Vancouver Secondary School	
30 (913)	**Aaron Looper**	Right-handed pitcher	University of Arkansas – Fort Smith	
31 (943)	Matt Woodward	First baseman	Florida State University	
32 (973)	**Dave Garley**	Right-handed pitcher	Glendale Community College	
33 (1003)	**Dell Lindsey**	Third baseman	Blinn College	
34 (1033)	**Eric Mitchell**	Catcher	DuBois Area High School	
35 (1063)	**Israel Torres**	Left-handed pitcher	Dominguez High School	
36 (1093)	Brian Ferreira	Outfielder	Barron G. Collier High School	
37 (1123)	**Mario Jackson**	Outfielder	Pasadena City College	
38 (1153)	**Ryan Webb**	Third baseman	Citrus College	
39 (1183)	**Brian Spottsville**	Shortstop	Compton High School	
40 (1213)	**Joseph Reyes**	Shortstop	Farmington High School	
41 (1240)	Kaazim Summerville	Outfielder	Burlingame High School	
42 (1267)	**Andrew Padilla**	Shortstop	Highland High School	
43 (1291)	**Bryan Krill**	Right-handed pitcher	Rancho Santiago College	
44 (1313)	Peter Graham	Right-handed pitcher	Brookdale Community College	
45 (1334)	Shaun Stokes	Right-handed pitcher	Jefferson Township High School	
46 (1353)	**Barry Hawkins**	Third baseman	Saddleback College	
47 (1372)	**Thomas Cunningham**	Catcher	Leesburg High School	
48 (1389)	Nick Padilla	Right-handed pitcher	St. Paul High School	
49 (1406)	**Joe Barnes**	Outfielder	Indian River State College	
50 (1422)	Jon Brandt	Right-handed pitcher	Palo Alto High School	
51 (1437)	**Chris Silva**	Left-handed pitcher	Queensborough Community College	
52 (1451)	**Shah Bobonis**	Right-handed pitcher	Miami Southridge High School	
53 (1464)	**Scott Starkey**	Left-handed pitcher	Palomar College	
54 (1475)	**Kie Polard**	Outfielder	Crenshaw High School	
55 (1486)	D. J. Houlton	Right-handed pitcher	Servite High School	
56 (1497)	**Kevin Bice**	Right-handed pitcher	Rancho Santiago College	
57 (1508)	**Kyle Albright**	Outfielder	Palomar College	
58 (1519)	**Chris Mayberry**	Third baseman	Saugus High School	
59 (1528)	**Jamel White**	Outfielder	Antelope Valley College	
60 (1536)	Desmond Dailey	Outfielder	Eastern Arizona College	

== Rule 5 draft ==
=== Key ===
Pick	Indicates the pick the player was drafted
Previous team	Indicates the previous organization, not Minor league team

=== Table ===
Phase (Pick)	Name	Position	Previous team	Notes	Ref
Majors (1)	Jeff Huson	Outfielder	Colorado Rockies		
