= List of 1996 Seattle Mariners draft picks =

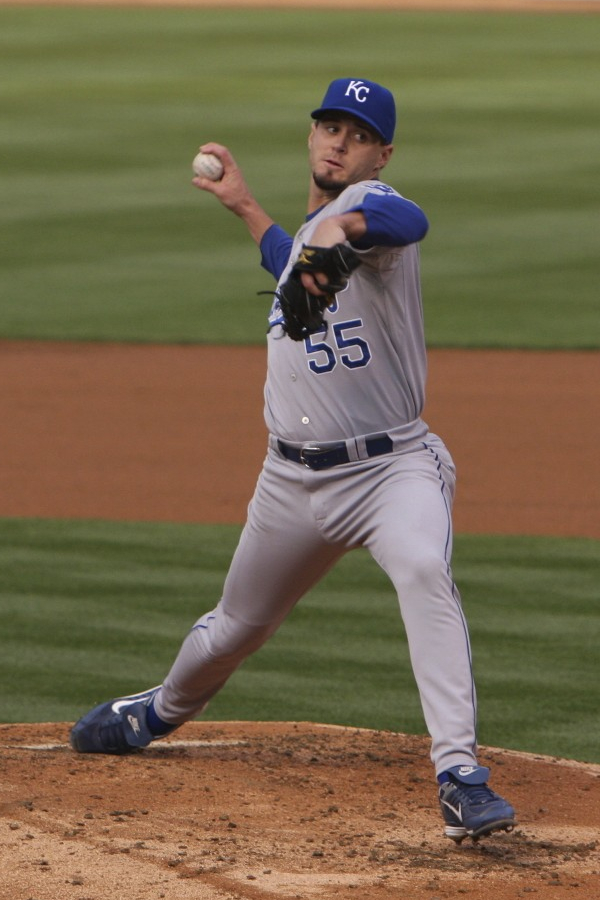
1996 Seattle Mariners draft picks
Gil Meche (pictured) was the Mariners first-round pick in 1996.
Information
Owner	Nintendo of America
General Manager(s)	Woody Woodward
Manager(s)	Lou Piniella
First pick	Gil Meche
Draft position	22nd
Number of selections	60
Links
Results	Baseball-Reference
Official Site	The Official Site of the Seattle Mariners
Years	1995 • 1996 • 1997

The following is a list of 1996 Seattle Mariners draft picks. The Mariners took part in the June regular draft, also known as the Rule 4 draft. The Mariners made 60 selections in the 1996 draft, the first being pitcher Gil Meche in the first round. In all, the Mariners selected 35 pitchers, 11 outfielders, 5 catchers, 4 shortstops, 4 third basemen, and 1 second baseman.

== Draft ==
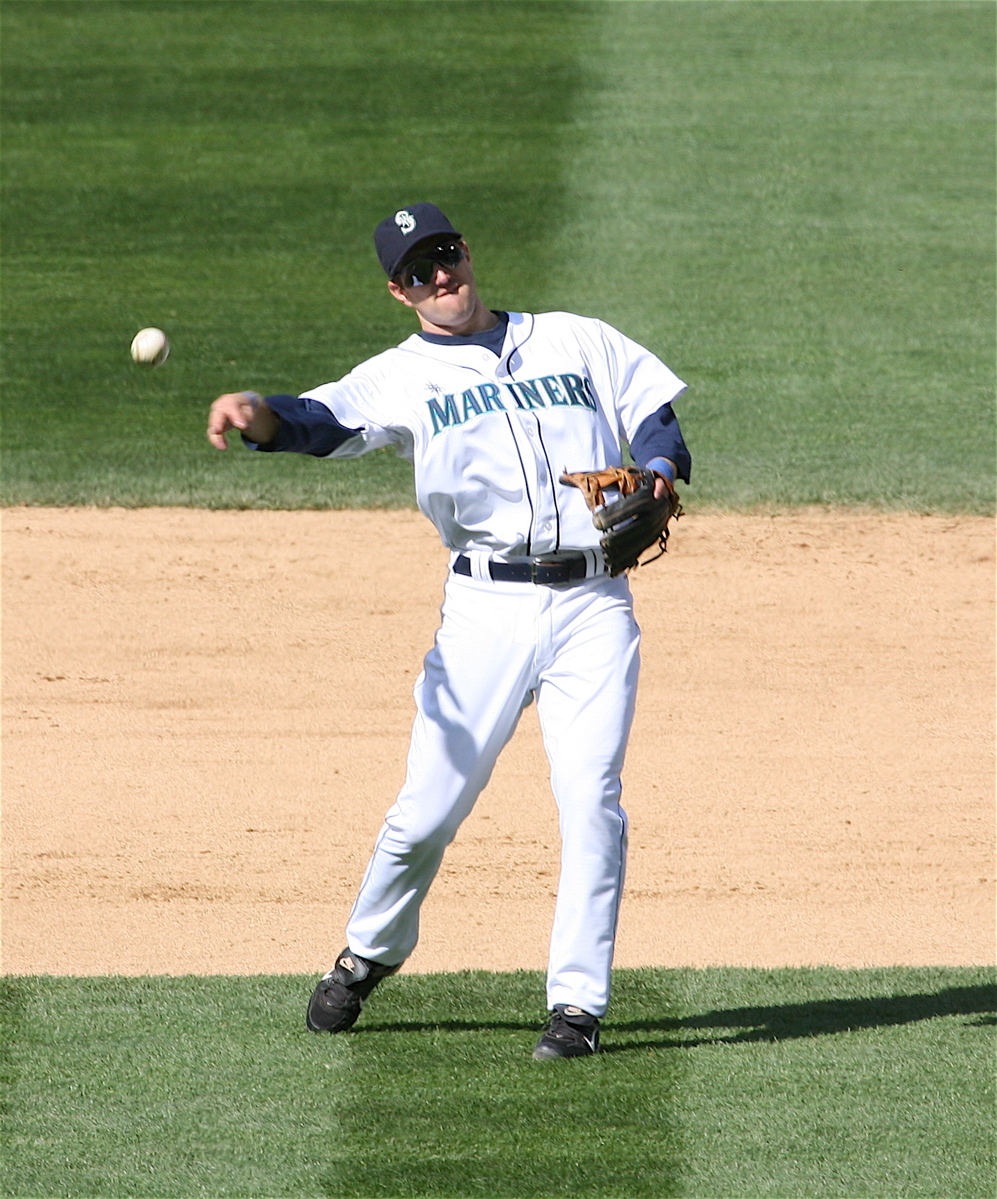
Willie Bloomquist was selected in the eighth round of the 1996 draft by the Mariners

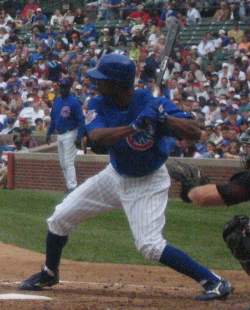
The Mariners selected Juan Pierre in the 48th round.

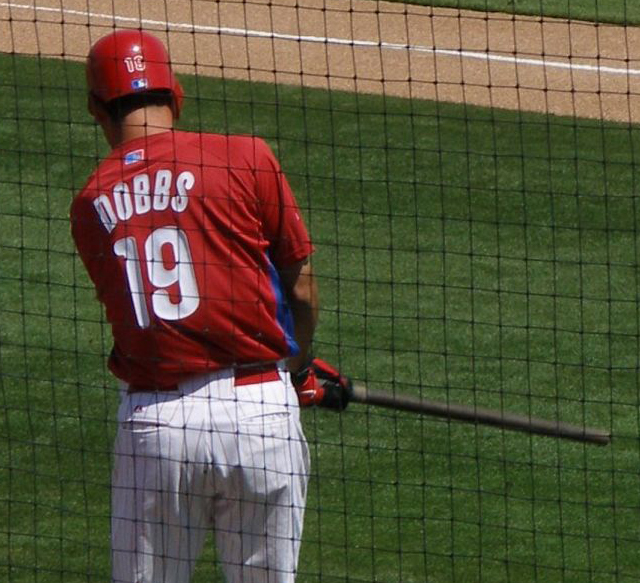
With the 1509th pick of the 1996 draft the Mariners selected Greg Dobbs.

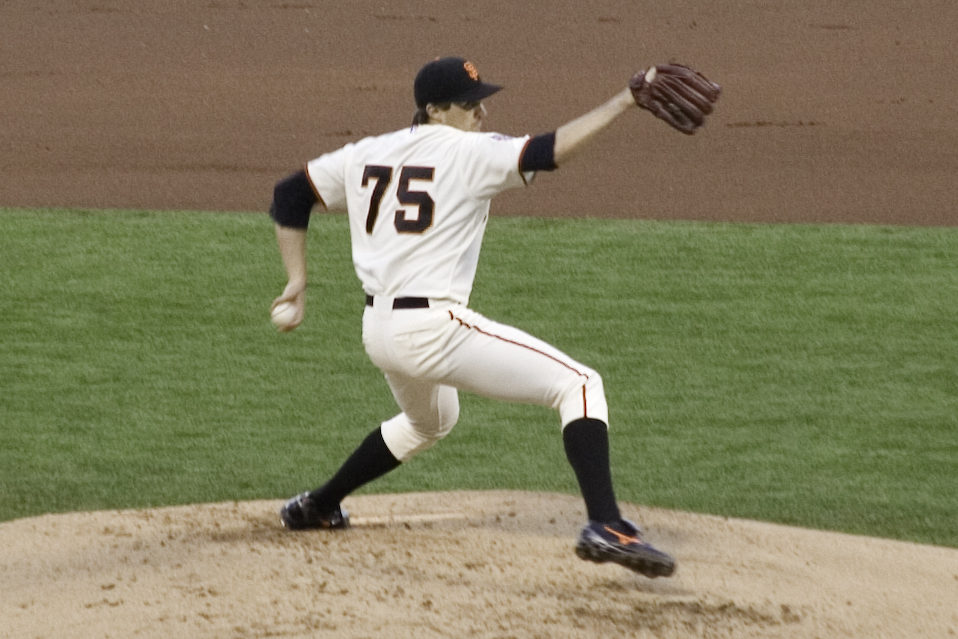
The Mariners' 59th-round pick was Barry Zito.

=== Key ===
Round (Pick)	Indicates the round and pick the player was drafted
Position	Indicates the secondary/collegiate position at which the player was drafted, rather than the professional position the player may have gone on to play
**Bold**	Indicates the player signed with the Mariners
Italics	Indicates the player did not sign with the Mariners
*	Indicates the player made an appearance in Major League Baseball

=== Table ===
Round (Pick)	Name	Position	School	Source
1 (22)	**Gil Meche**	Right-handed pitcher	Acadiana High School	
2 (57)	**Jeff Farnsworth**	Right-handed pitcher	Okaloosa-Walton Community College	
3 (87)	**Tony DeJesus**	Left-handed pitcher	Havelock High School	
4 (117)	**Denny Stark**	Right-handed pitcher	University of Toledo	
5 (147)	**Chris Mears**	Right-handed pitcher	Lord Byng Secondary School	
6 (177)	**Peanut Williams**	Catcher	Nacogdoches High School	
7 (207)	**Dan Garey**	Right-handed pitcher	St. Joseph High School	
8 (237)	Willie Bloomquist	Shortstop	South Kitsap High School	
9 (267)	**Robert Luce**	Right-handed pitcher	University of Nevada, Las Vegas	
10 (297)	**Matt Noe**	Left-handed pitcher	Riverside City College	
11 (327)	**Julio Ayala**	Left-handed pitcher	Georgia Southern University	
12 (357)	**Joe Victery**	Right-handed pitcher	University of Oklahoma	
13 (387)	**Orin Kawahara**	Right-handed pitcher	Rancho Santiago College	
14 (417)	Dwayne Dobson	Right-handed pitcher	State College of Florida, Manatee–Sarasota	
15 (447)	**Greg Beaver**	Right-handed pitcher	East Rowan High School	
16 (477)	**Mark Carroll**	Catcher	Coxsackie-Athens High School	
17 (507)	**Jason Bond**	Left-handed pitcher	Arizona State University	
18 (537)	**Allen Westfall**	Right-handed pitcher	University of Miami	
19 (567)	**Larry Haynes**	Outfielder	Nogales High School	
20 (597)	**Brian Fitzgerald**	Left-handed pitcher	Virginia Polytechnic Institute and State University	
21 (627)	**Kyle Kennison**	Right-handed pitcher	University of Southern Maine	
22 (657)	**Brian Lindner**	Shortstop	William Paterson University	
23 (687)	**Devlon Davis**	Catcher	Pittsburg High School	
24 (717)	**Jeremy Pierce**	Right-handed pitcher	Ventura College	
25 (747)	Matt Vincent	Left-handed pitcher	Floyd Central High School	
26 (777)	**Jake Underwood**	Catcher	Hillsboro High School	
27 (807)	**Josué Matos**	Right-handed pitcher	Eugenio María De Hostos School	
28 (837)	Don Ross	Third baseman	Columbia State Community College	
29 (867)	**Karmen Randolph**	Shortstop	University of Nebraska–Lincoln	
30 (897)	**Jason Wilson**	Right-handed pitcher	Broward College	
31 (927)	**Duncan McAdoo**	Right-handed pitcher	Winnsboro High School	
32 (957)	**Kevin Stewart**	Third baseman	Corona del Mar High School	
33 (987)	P. J. Williams	Outfielder	Blinn College	
34 (1017)	Joe Barnes	Outfielder	Old Mill High School	
35 (1047)	**Dallas Mahan**	Left-handed pitcher	Greeley West High School	
36 (1077)	**Scott Harrison**	Left-handed pitcher	Dixie State College	
37 (1107)	**Steven Rivera**	Left-handed pitcher	Community College of Baltimore County	
38 (1137)	**Laron McGee**	Shortstop	Samuel F. B. Morse High School	
39 (1167)	James McCoy	Outfielder	South Dade High School	
40 (1197)	**Sean Spencer**	Left-handed pitcher	University of Washington	
41 (1226)	**William Allison**	Right-handed pitcher	College of Central Florida	
42 (1255)	**Brett Anderson**	Right-handed pitcher	University of San Diego High School	
43 (1282)	Scott Starkey	Left-handed pitcher	Vista High School	
44 (1308)	**Noel Pelekoudas**	Second baseman	Eastlake High School	
45 (1334)	Adam Walker	Left-handed pitcher	Yavapai College	
46 (1359)	**Michael Campbell**	Outfielder	Mesa Community College	
47 (1383)	**Bret Nielsen**	Outfielder	Grossmont High School	
48 (1406)	Juan Pierre	Outfielder	Galveston College	
49 (1429)	Richard Sundstrom	Right-handed pitcher	Cypress College	
50 (1452)	**Jason Sutherland**	Catcher	Chuckey-Doak High School	
51 (1473)	**Jason Regan**	Third baseman	Blinn College	
52 (1492)	Michael Albert	Outfielder	Carlsbad High School	
53 (1509)	Greg Dobbs	Third baseman	Canyon Springs High School	
54 (1525)	**Rich Snider**	Right-handed pitcher	Byng High School	
55 (1541)	Chad Schmidt	Outfielder	Skidmore Tynan High School	
56 (1556)	**Brandon Barnaby**	Right-handed pitcher	Citrus College	
57 (1567)	**Tamar Turner**	Outfielder	Liberty High School	
58 (1577)	**Brian Beinfest**	Left-handed pitcher	Clayton Valley High School	
59 (1587)	Barry Zito	Left-handed pitcher	University of San Diego High School	
60 (1596)	Ryan Grimmett	Outfielder	University of Miami	
