= List of 1998 Seattle Mariners draft picks =

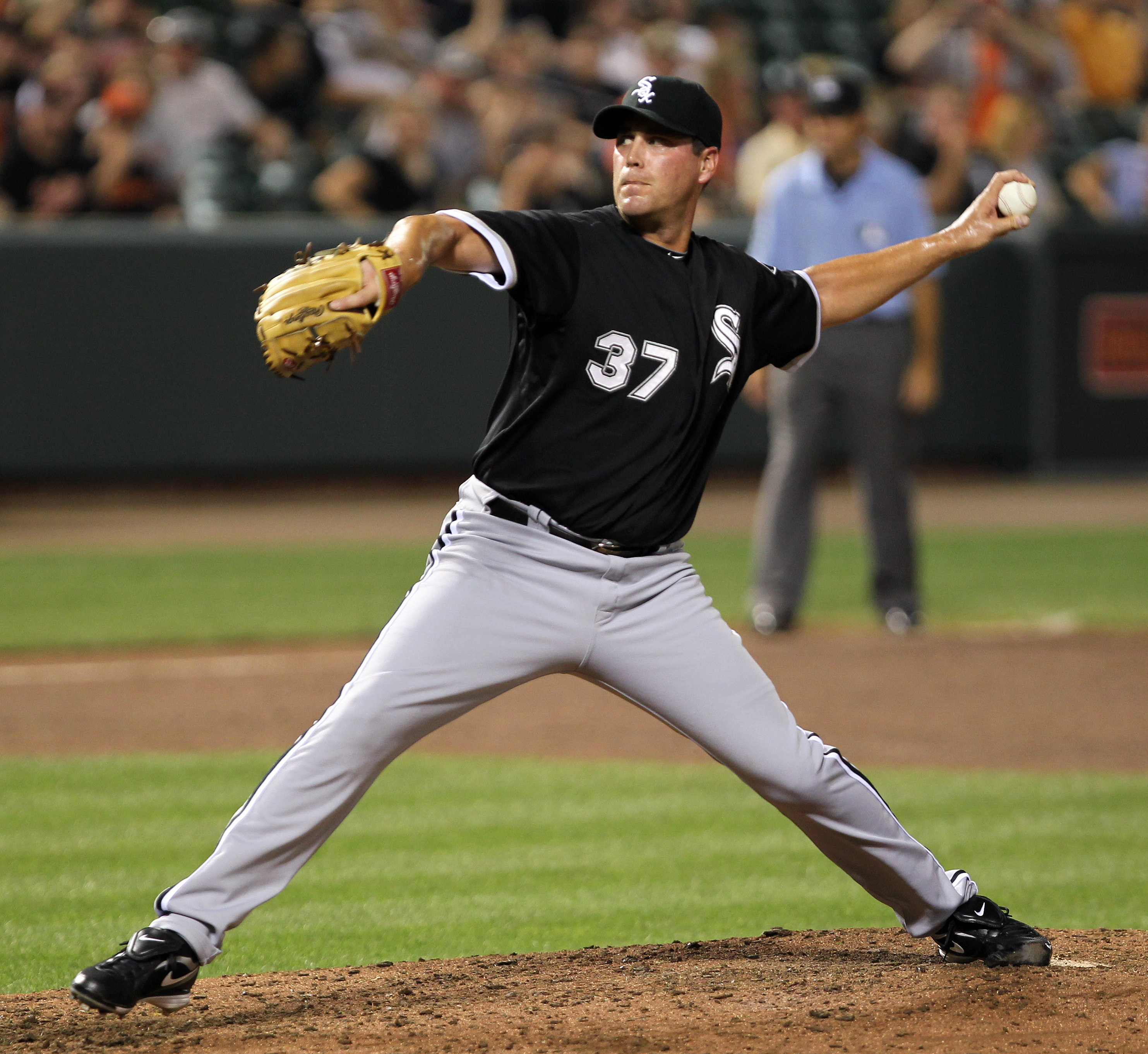
1998 Seattle Mariners draft picks
Matt Thornton (pictured) was the Mariners first round pick in 1998.
Information
Owner	Nintendo of America
General Manager(s)	Woody Woodward
Manager(s)	Lou Piniella
First pick	Matt Thornton
Draft position	22nd
Number of selections	50
Links
Results	Baseball-Reference
Official Site	The Official Site of the Seattle Mariners
Years	1997 • 1998 • 1999

The following is a list of 1998 Seattle Mariners draft picks. The Mariners took part in the June regular draft, also known as the Rule 4 draft. The Mariners made 50 selections in the 1998 draft, the first being pitcher Matt Thornton in the first round. In all, the Mariners selected 23 pitchers, 9 outfielders, 7 catchers, 5 shortstops, 3 first basemen, 2 third basemen, and 1 second baseman.

== Draft ==
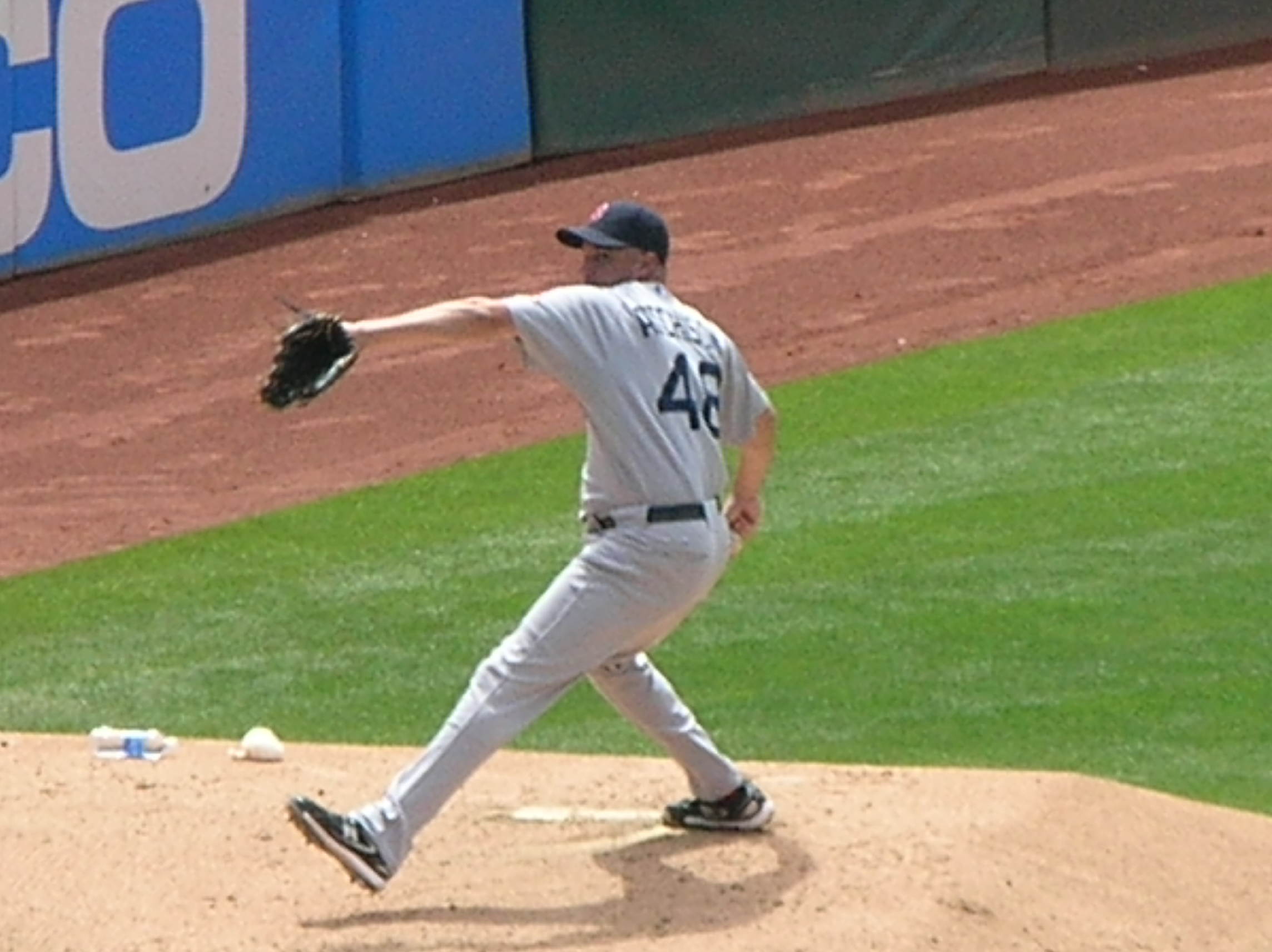
Scott Atchison was the 49th round pick of the Mariners in 1998.

=== Key ===
Round (Pick)	Indicates the round and pick the player was drafted
Position	Indicates the secondary/collegiate position at which the player was drafted, rather than the professional position the player may have gone on to play
**Bold**	Indicates the player signed with the Mariners
Italics	Indicates the player did not sign with the Mariners
*	Indicates the player made an appearance in Major League Baseball

=== Table ===
Round (Pick)	Name	Position	School	Source
1 (22)	**Matt Thornton**	Left-handed pitcher	Grand Valley State University	
2 (65)	Jeff Verplancke	Right-handed pitcher	California State University, Los Angeles	
3 (95)	**Andy Van Hekken**	Left-handed pitcher	Holland High School	
4 (125)	**Jerry Amador**	Outfielder	Luis Felipe Crespo High School	
5 (155)	**Corey Freeman**	Shortstop	C. Leon King High School	
6 (185)	**Jake Weber**	Outfielder	University of North Carolina at Chapel Hill	
7 (215)	**Shawn McCorkle**	First baseman	Montclair State University	
8 (245)	**Craig Kuzmic**	Catcher	Texas A&M University	
9 (275)	**Neil Longo**	Right-handed pitcher	Manhattan College	
10 (305)	Jason Pomar	Right-handed pitcher	University of South Carolina	
11 (335)	Jarrett Shearin	Outfielder	University of North Carolina at Chapel Hill	
12 (365)	**Justin Dunning**	Right-handed pitcher	Stanford University	
13 (395)	**Israel Cruz**	Shortstop	Dr. José M. Lázaro School	
14 (425)	**Schuyler Doakes**	Shortstop	Jackson State University	
15 (455)	**Wilfredo Quintana**	Outfielder	Indian Hills Community College	
16 (485)	**Pat Barnes**	Left-handed pitcher	Englewood High School	
17 (515)	**Steve Wright**	Outfielder	Liberty University	
18 (545)	**Craig Willis**	Right-handed pitcher	Pacific Lutheran University	
19 (575)	**Rick Southall**	First baseman	Portland State University	
20 (605)	Jon Nelson	Shortstop	Timpanogos High School	
21 (635)	**Brandon DeJaynes**	Right-handed pitcher	Quincy Senior High School	
22 (665)	**Mike Myers**	Shortstop	Bishop Verot High School	
23 (695)	**Bryan Hartung**	Right-handed pitcher	Sinton High School	
24 (725)	**Matt Woodward**	First baseman	Florida State University	
25 (755)	Craig Helmandollar	Left-handed pitcher	North Stafford High School	
26 (785)	**Caleb Balbuena**	Right-handed pitcher	California State University, Long Beach	
27 (815)	**Jason Crist**	Left-handed pitcher	Missouri State University	
28 (845)	**Bo Robinson**	Third baseman	University of North Carolina at Chapel Hill	
29 (875)	**Derald Deason**	Outfielder	Orange High School	
30 (905)	John Rheinecker	Left-handed pitcher	Belleville High School	
31 (935)	**Roy Wells**	Right-handed pitcher	Volunteer State Community College	
32 (965)	**Clayton Bried**	Outfielder	Apache Junction High School	
33 (995)	Branden Pack	Catcher	Cypress College	
34 (1025)	**Nick Padilla**	Right-handed pitcher	Cerritos College	
35 (1055)	Guarionez Rodriguez	Second baseman	Medardo Carazo School	
36 (1085)	**Tim Dierkes**	Catcher	Mehlville High School	
37 (1115)	**Michael Kashuba**	Right-handed pitcher	Clarence Fulton Secondary School	
38 (1145)	**Clint Patton**	Catcher	Sonora High School	
39 (1175)	**Aaron Kirkland**	Right-handed pitcher	Lurleen B. Wallace Community College	
40 (1205)	Adam Thomas	Right-handed pitcher	North Miami High School	
41 (1235)	**Nicholas Hobbs**	Outfielder	Chaparral High School	
42 (1264)	Geoff Comfort	Outfielder	Serra High School	
43 (1292)	**James Farris**	Catcher	Hattiesburg High School	
44 (1318)	Israel Torres	Left-handed pitcher	Cerritos College	
45 (1343)	**Drew Parkin**	Right-handed pitcher	Aliso Niguel High School	
46 (1366)	Ernie Durazo	Third baseman	Pima Community College	
47 (1387)	Clayton McCullough	Catcher	Junius H. Rose High School	
48 (1407)	**Greg Pines**	Catcher	Saddleback High School	
49 (1424)	**Scott Atchison**	Right-handed pitcher	Texas Christian University	
50 (1440)	**David Holliday**	Left-handed pitcher	Anderson Shiro High School	
