= List of 1992 Seattle Mariners draft picks =

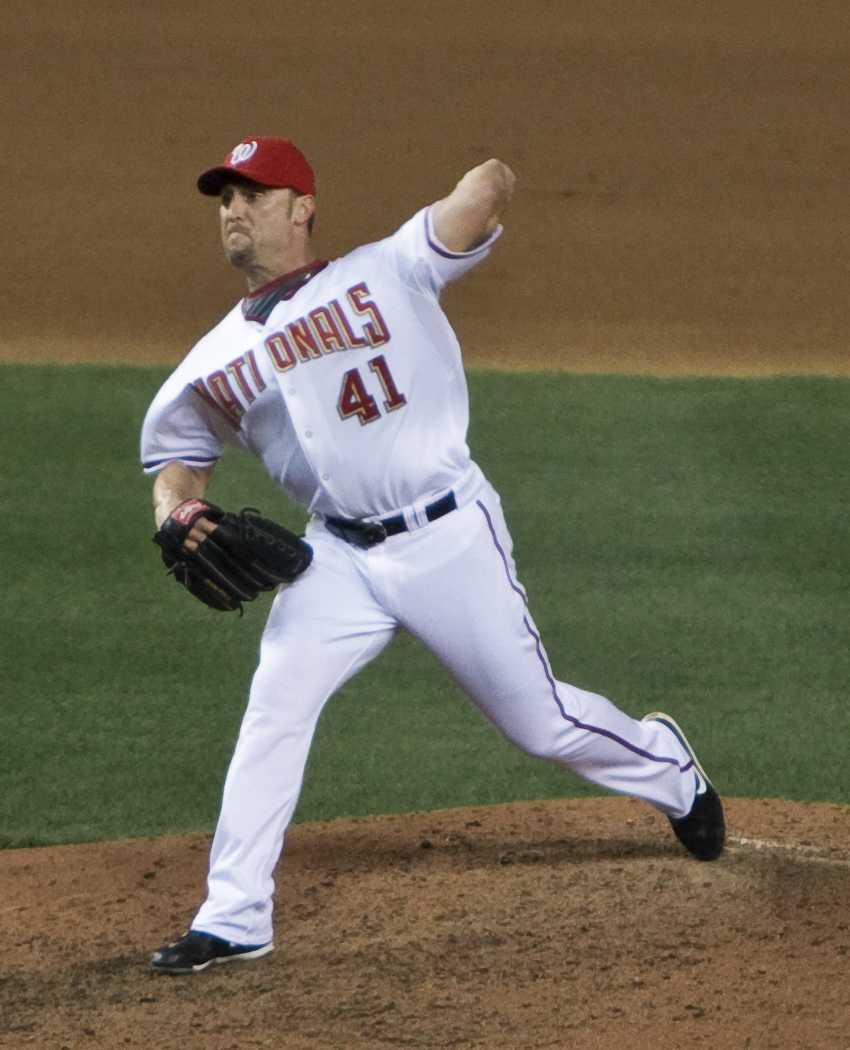
1992 Seattle Mariners draft picks
Ron Villone (pictured) was the Mariners first round pick in 1992.
Information
Owners	Jeff Smulyan Nintendo of America
General Manager(s)	Woody Woodward
Manager(s)	Bill Plummer
First pick	Ron Villone
Draft positions	14
Number of selections	50
Links
Results	Baseball-Reference
Official Site	The Official Site of the Seattle Mariners
Years	1991 • 1992 • 1993

The following is a list of 1992 Seattle Mariners draft picks. The list includes the June regular draft (Rule 4 draft). The Mariners made 50 selections in the June regular draft, and of those picks 31 were pitchers, 6 were outfielders, 4 were catchers, 4 were third basemen, 2 were first basemen, 2 were shortstops, and 1 was a second baseman.

== Draft ==
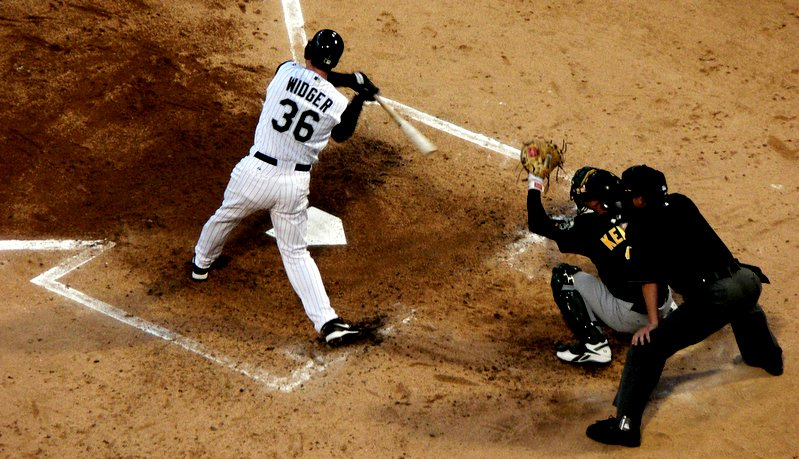
Chris Widger (batting) was selected by the Mariners in the third round.

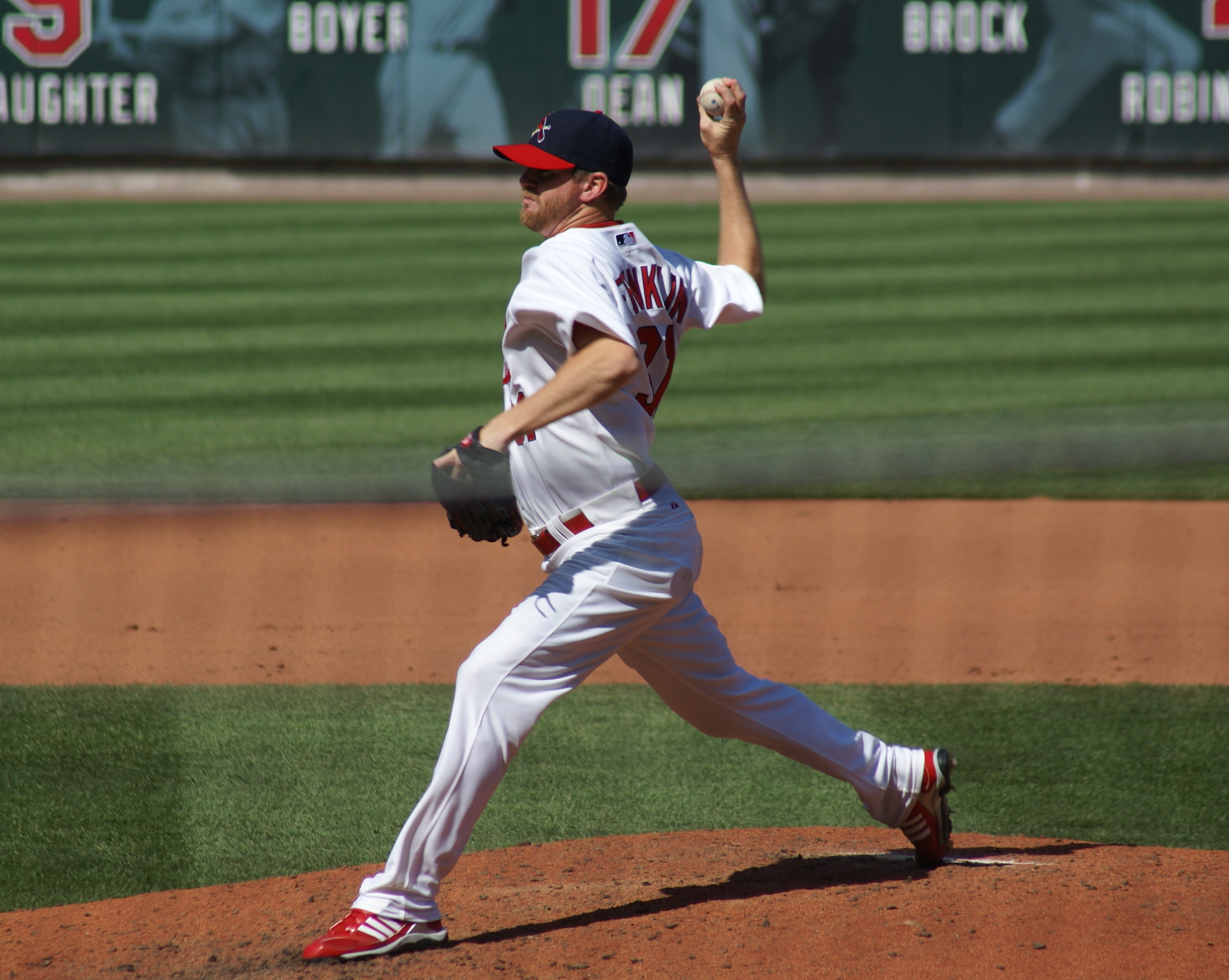
In the 23rd round of the 1992 draft the Mariners selected Ryan Franklin.

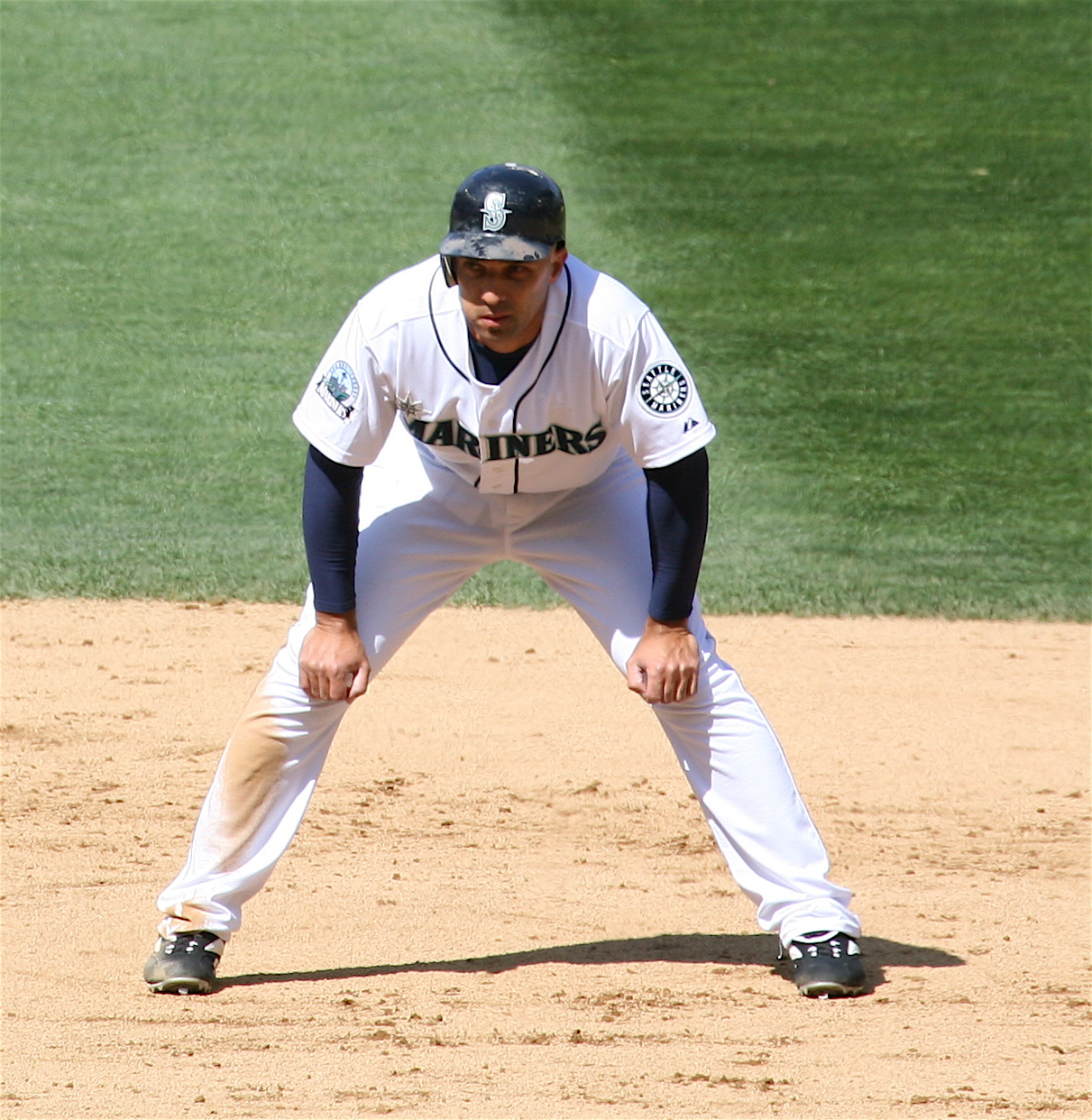
The Mariners selected Raúl Ibañez in the 36th round of the 1992 draft.

=== Key ===
Round (Pick)	Indicates the round and pick the player was drafted
Position	Indicates the secondary/collegiate position at which the player was drafted, rather than the professional position the player may have gone on to play
**Bold**	Indicates the player signed with the Mariners
Italics	Indicates the player did not sign with the Mariners
*	Indicates the player made an appearance in Major League Baseball

=== Table ===
Round (Pick)	Name	Position	School	Source
1 (14)	**Ron Villone**	Left-handed pitcher	University of Massachusetts Amherst	
2 (52)	**Bob Wolcott**	Right-handed pitcher	North Medford High School	
3 (82)	**Chris Widger**	Catcher	George Mason University	
4 (110)	**Andy Sheets**	Shortstop	Louisiana State University	
5 (138)	**Dave Vanhof**	Left-handed pitcher	Southgate Anderson High School	
6 (166)	**Tim Davis**	Left-handed pitcher	Florida State University	
7 (194)	**Chris Desseliler**	Right-handed pitcher	Ypsilanti High School	
8 (222)	**Brian Doughty**	Right-handed pitcher	Juanita High School	
9 (250)	Ivan Montane	Right-handed pitcher	Miami Dade College	
10 (278)	**Joe Pomierski**	Third baseman	Biloxi High School	
11 (306)	Chris Dean	Outfielder	Hayward High School	
12 (334)	**Mike Hickey**	Second baseman	Texas A&M University	
13 (362)	**Oscar Rivera**	Right-handed pitcher	San Jose City College	
14 (390)	**Brian Wallace**	Third baseman	University of Delaware	
15 (418)	Todd Johnson	Catcher	Fresno State University	
16 (446)	**Brett Hinchliffe**	Right-handed pitcher	Bishop Gallagher High School	
17 (478)	Jack Stanczak	Third baseman	Villanova University	
18 (502)	**Jackie Nickell**	Right-handed pitcher	University of Southern California	
19 (530)	Brent Smith	Right-handed pitcher	Arizona State University	
20 (558)	**Bobby Worley**	Right-handed pitcher	Ohio State University	
21 (586)	Ray Farmer	Outfielder	Robert B. Glenn High School	
22 (614)	Ryan Nye	Right-handed pitcher	University of Arkansas – Fort Smith	
23 (642)	**Ryan Franklin**	Right-handed pitcher	Seminole State College of Florida	
24 (670)	**James Clifford**	First baseman	University of Washington	
25 (698)	**Derek Bieniasz**	Right-handed pitcher	West Toronto Collegiate	
26 (726)	**Chris Sturgeon**	Right-handed pitcher	Grant High School	
27 (757)	**Josh Potter**	Pitcher	Junius H. Rose High School	
28 (782)	**Marcus Sturdivant**	Outfielder	West Stanly High School	
29 (810)	**Stacey Davis**	First baseman	Southwest DeKalb High School	
30 (338)	**Eric Pouliard**	Outfielder	Sacred Heart High School	
31 (866)	**Richard Graham**	Pitcher	University of Massachusetts Amherst	
32 (894)	Jason Haynie	Left-handed pitcher	Lakewood High School	
33 (922)	**Raymond Miller**	Third baseman	Dobson High School	
34 (950)	**Tim Harikkala**	Right-handed pitcher	Florida Atlantic University	
35 (978)	**Ron Cody**	Right-handed pitcher	University of California, Riverside	
36 (1006)	**Raúl Ibañez**	Outfielder	Miami Dade College	
37 (1034)	**Christian Shewey**	Catcher	Redmond High School	
38 (1062)	**Jamon Deal**	Right-handed pitcher	University of North Carolina at Asheville	
39 (1090)	**Jerry Aschoff**	Left-handed pitcher	Pepperdine University	
40 (1118)	**Michael Brady**	Outfielder	Glasgow High School	
41 (1146)	Phil Olson	Right-handed pitcher	Riverview High School	
42 (1174)	**Brian Williams**	Right-handed pitcher	Phoenix College	
43 (1202)	**Dennis Regan**	Catcher	Loomis Chaffee	
44 (1230)	**Jeff Martin**	Left-handed pitcher	Mahomet-Seymour High School	
45 (1258)	**Charles Golden**	Right-handed pitcher	Opelika High School	
46 (1286)	**Randall Wilson**	Right-handed pitcher	Esperanza High School	
47 (1314)	Chad Soden	Left-handed pitcher	University of Arkansas – Fort Smith	
48 (1342)	Dax Winslett	Right-handed pitcher	McLennan Community College	
49 (1370)	**Kevin Stock**	Left-handed pitcher	University of Virginia	
50 (1398)	**Mike Martin**	Shortstop	State College of Florida, Manatee–Sarasota	
