= List of 1995 Seattle Mariners draft picks =

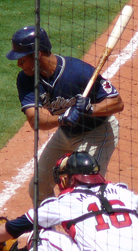
1995 Seattle Mariners draft picks
José Cruz Jr. (pictured) was the Mariners first round pick in 1995.
Information
Owner	Nintendo of America
General Manager(s)	Woody Woodward
Manager(s)	Lou Piniella
First pick	José Cruz Jr.
Draft position	3rd
Number of selections	77
Links
Results	Baseball-Reference
Official Site	The Official Site of the Seattle Mariners
Years	1994 • 1995 • 1996

The following is a list of 1995 Seattle Mariners draft picks. The Mariners took part in the June regular draft, also known as the Rule 4 draft. The Mariners made 77 selections in the 1995 draft, the first being outfielder José Cruz Jr. in the first round. In all, the Mariners selected 37 pitchers, 20 outfielders, 8 catchers, 6 shortstops, 3 first basemen, 2 third basemen, and 1 second baseman.

== Draft ==
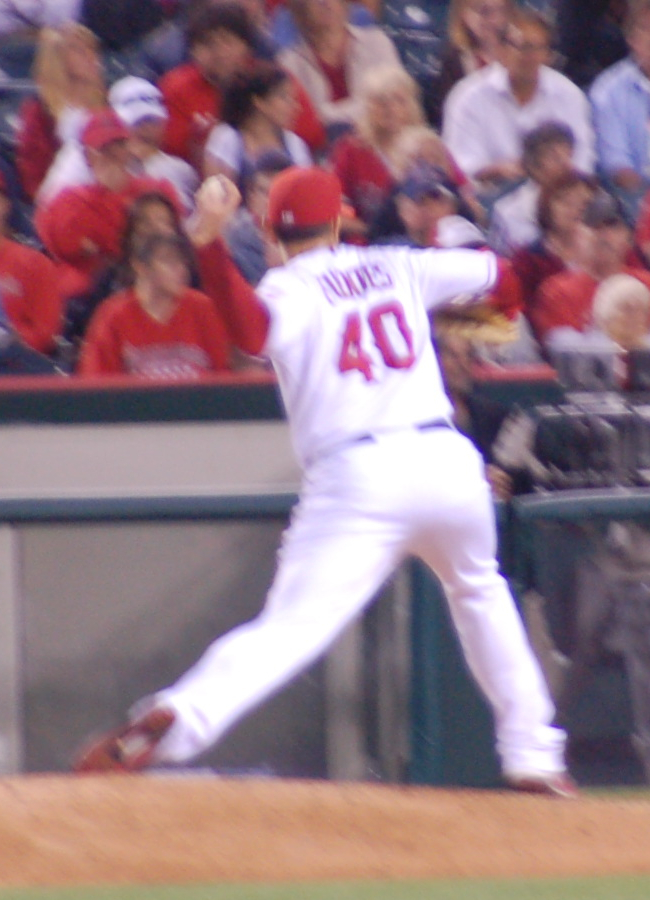
Brian Fuentes was the Mariners' 25th round pick in 1995.

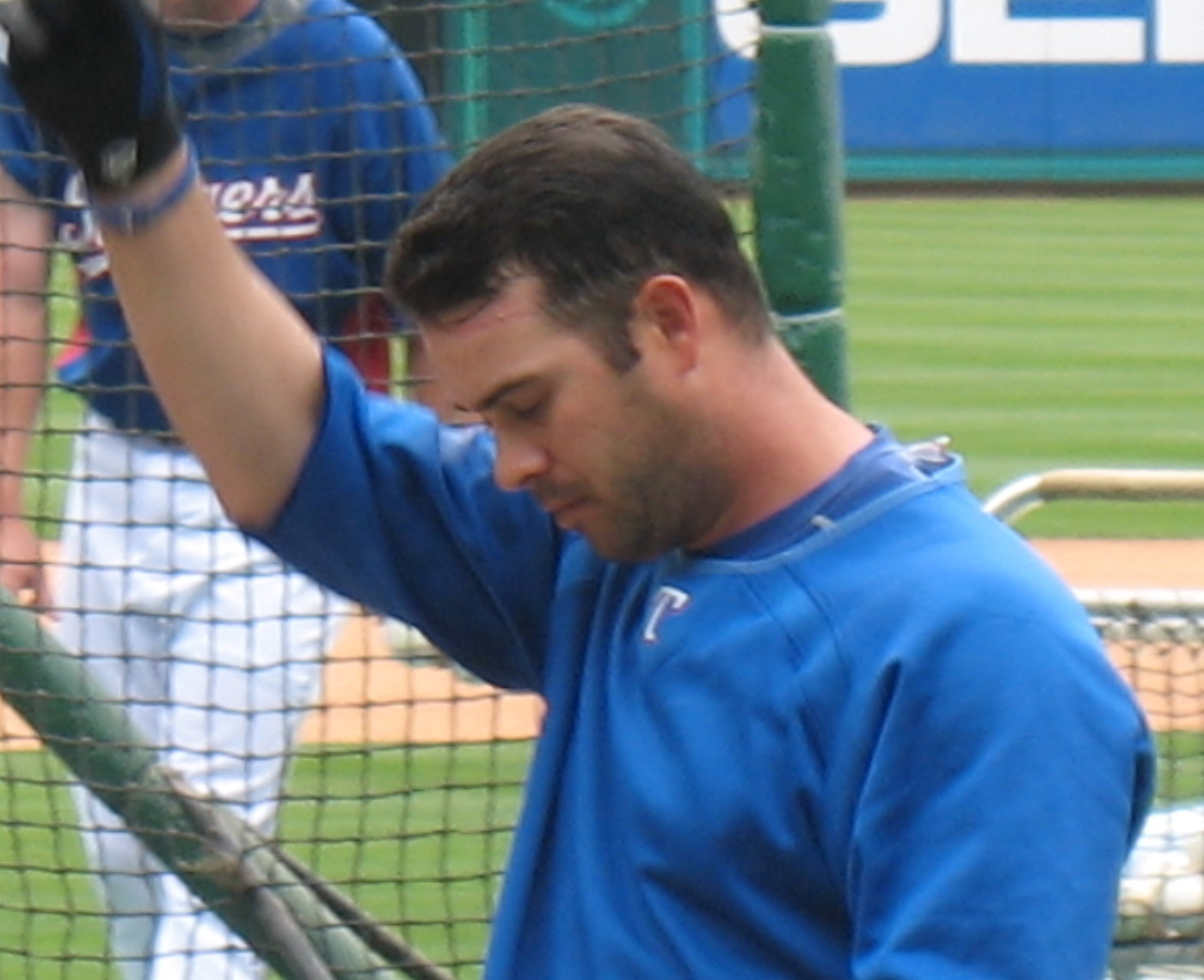
The Mariners selected Ramón Vázquez in the 27th round of the 1995 draft.

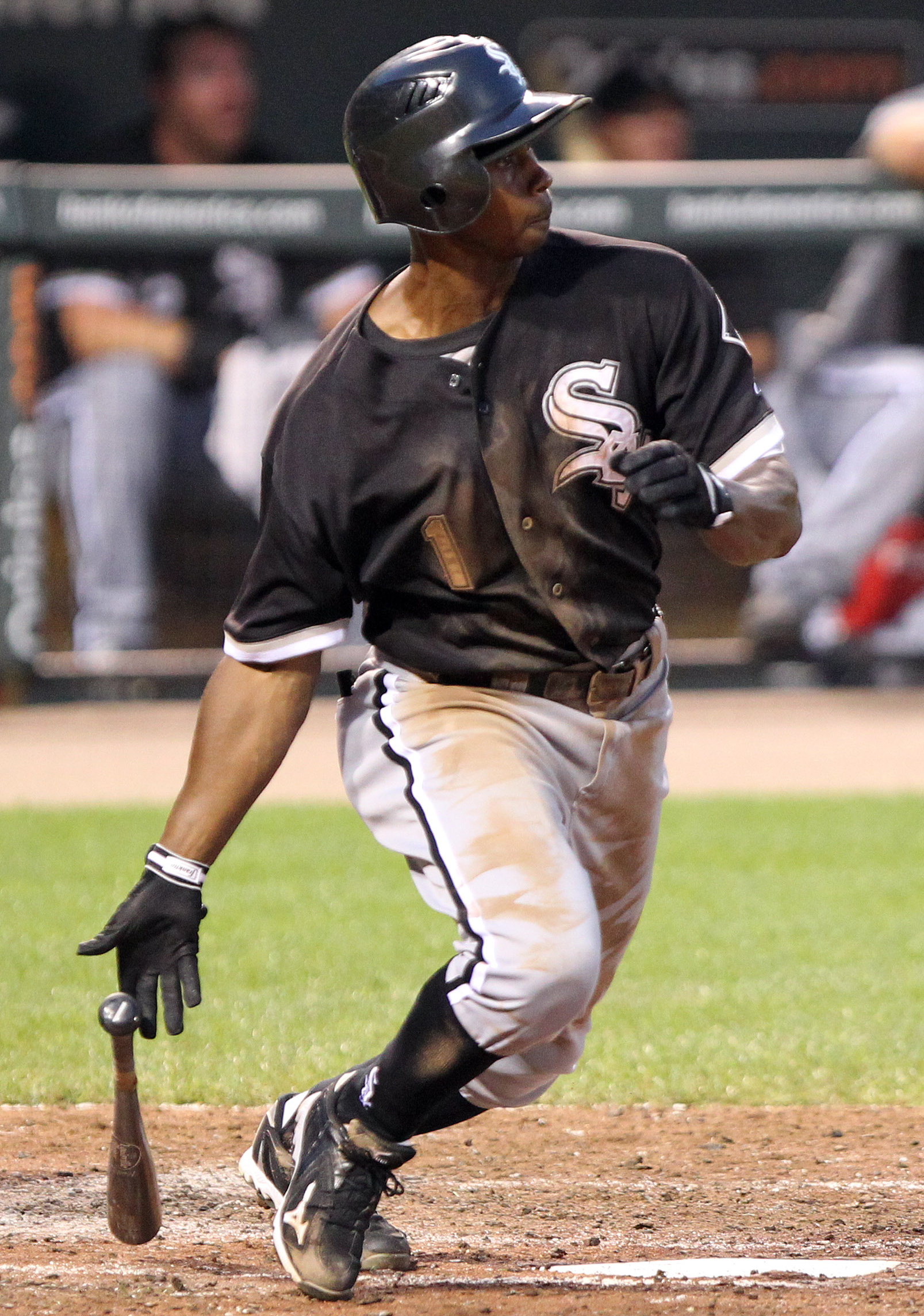
The 818th pick of the 1995 draft was Juan Pierre.

=== Key ===
Round (Pick)	Indicates the round and pick the player was drafted
Position	Indicates the secondary/collegiate position at which the player was drafted, rather than the professional position the player may have gone on to play
**Bold**	Indicates the player signed with the Mariners
Italics	Indicates the player did not sign with the Mariners
*	Indicates the player made an appearance in Major League Baseball

=== Table ===
Round (Pick)	Name	Position	School	Source
1 (3)	**José Cruz Jr.**	Outfielder	Rice University	
2 (33)	**Shane Monahan**	Outfielder	Clemson University	
3 (62)	**Greg Wooten**	Right-handed pitcher	Portland State University	
4 (90)	**Duan Johnson**	Shortstop	St. Pauls High School	
5 (118)	**Gary Kinnie**	Right-handed pitcher	Chippewa Valley High School	
6 (146)	**Karl Thompson**	Catcher	Santa Clara University	
7 (174)	**Brandon Nogowski**	Left-handed pitcher	Hood River Valley High School	
8 (202)	**Seth Brizek**	Shortstop	Clemson University	
9 (230)	**Marty Weymouth**	Right-handed pitcher	Brother Rice High School	
10 (258)	**Ernest Tolbert**	Outfielder	Abraham Lincoln High School	
11 (286)	**Russ Koehler**	Right-handed pitcher	Chemeketa Community College	
12 (314)	**Dan Kurtz**	Right-handed pitcher	Le Moyne College	
13 (342)	**Andy Collett**	Right-handed pitcher	Loyola Marymount University	
14 (370)	**Chad Sheffer**	Shortstop	University of Central Florida	
15 (398)	Lawrence Severence	Catcher	Bryan High School	
16 (426)	**Kevin Gryboski**	Right-handed pitcher	Wilkes University	
17 (454)	Aaron Myette	Right-handed pitcher	Johnston Heights Secondary School	
18 (482)	Wynter Phoenix	Outfielder	University of California, Santa Barbara	
19 (510)	**Justin Kaye**	Right-handed pitcher	Bishop Gorman High School	
20 (538)	**Greg Scheer**	Left-handed pitcher	Jacksonville University	
21 (566)	**Chad Soden**	Left-handed pitcher	Arkansas State University	
22 (594)	**Scott Maynard**	Catcher	Dana Hills High School	
23 (622)	**Rob Morrison**	Right-handed pitcher	Wellington High School	
24 (650)	Brett Laxton	Right-handed pitcher	Louisiana State University	
25 (678)	**Brian Fuentes**	Left-handed pitcher	Merced College	
26 (706)	Keith Law	Shortstop	East Paulding High School	
27 (734)	**Ramón Vázquez**	Shortstop	Indian Hills Community College	
28 (762)	**Greg Donahue**	Catcher	Rockland Community College	
29 (790)	**Charles Christianson**	Right-handed pitcher	Chaffey College	
30 (818)	Juan Pierre	Outfielder	Alexandria Senior High School	
31 (846)	Adam Walker	Left-handed pitcher	Yavapai College	
32 (874)	Harold Frazier	Right-handed pitcher	Oral Roberts University	
33 (902)	**Yusef Hamilton**	Outfielder	Saint Martin de Porres High School	
34 (930)	Richard Sundstrom	Right-handed pitcher	Kennedy High School	
35 (958)	Nathan Burnett	Right-handed pitcher	Rutherford High School	
36 (986)	**Todd Niemeier**	Left-handed pitcher	University of Southern Indiana	
37 (1014)	**Anthony Rice**	Third baseman	City College of San Francisco	
38 (1042)	Joseph Hunt	Outfielder	Santa Fe College	
39 (1070)	**Brian Nelson**	Catcher	Edison State College	
40 (1098)	Michael Campbell	Outfielder	Coronado High School	
41 (1126)	Shaylar Hatch	Right-handed pitcher	Gilbert High School	
42 (1154)	**Brian Grubbs**	Left-handed pitcher	Cooper High School	
43 (1182)	**Travis Ray**	Right-handed pitcher	Cairo High School	
44 (1210)	**Leron Cook**	Outfielder	Fresno City College	
45 (1238)	**Joe DeVisser**	Shortstop	Mattawan High School	
46 (1263)	Tim Burton	Right-handed pitcher	St. Thomas Aquinas High School	
47 (1287)	**Jeromy Palki**	Right-handed pitcher	Clackamas Community College	
48 (1310)	**James Pietraszko**	Catcher	Forest Heights Collegiate Institute	
49 (1332)	**Brian Smith**	Outfielder	Granite Hills High School	
50 (1354)	**Zachary Tharp**	First baseman	William R. Boone High School	
51 (1375)	**Jacob Hermann**	Left-handed pitcher	Eagle Point High School	
52 (1395)	**Joel Greene**	Left-handed pitcher	Linn–Benton Community College	
53 (1414)	**Brandon McNab**	First baseman	Boerne High School	
54 (1433)	**Jeffrey Hammond**	Outfielder	Flomaton High School	
55 (1451)	**Jason Balcom**	Outfielder	Mount de Sales Academy	
56 (1468)	**Brian Cawaring**	Outfielder	Alhambra High School	
57 (1483)	**Roy Roundy**	Catcher	Coronado High School	
58 (1497)	Todd Ozias	Right-handed pitcher	Miami Dade College	
59 (1511)	Jason Marr	Right-handed pitcher	Cerritos College	
60 (1524)	**Rafael Rivera**	Right-handed pitcher	Miami Dade College	
61 (1534)	**Ray Farmer**	Outfielder	Duke University	
62 (1544)	**Eric Moten**	Outfielder	Grant High School	
63 (1553)	**Joseph Seymour**	Catcher	Southside High School	
64 (1562)	**Damon Warren**	Right-handed pitcher	Lower Columbia College	
65 (1570)	**Sean Hansen**	First baseman	Norco High School	
66 (1578)	**Isaac Burton**	Right-handed pitcher	Arizona State University	
67 (1585)	**Sean Kelley**	Right-handed pitcher	Miramar High School	
68 (1592)	**Steve Kokinda**	Third baseman	Palm Beach State College	
69 (1599)	**Gerald Eady**	Outfielder	Seminole State College of Florida	
70 (1605)	**Sean Hamilton**	Right-handed pitcher	Dunedin High School	
71 (1611)	**Eric Lloyd**	Right-handed pitcher	Charlton County High School	
72 (1616)	**Brian Shultz**	Outfielder	Blinn College	
73 (1620)	**Travis Knight**	Second baseman	Kent-Meridian High School	
74 (1624)	**Tim Hentey**	Outfielder	Eastside High School	
75 (1628)	**Wendell Simmons**	Right-handed pitcher	Southwest Magnet High School	
76 (1632)	**Michael Anderson**	Outfielder	Jones County High School	
77 (1636)	**Shane Roland**	Outfielder	Cook County High School	
