= List of 1999 Seattle Mariners draft picks =

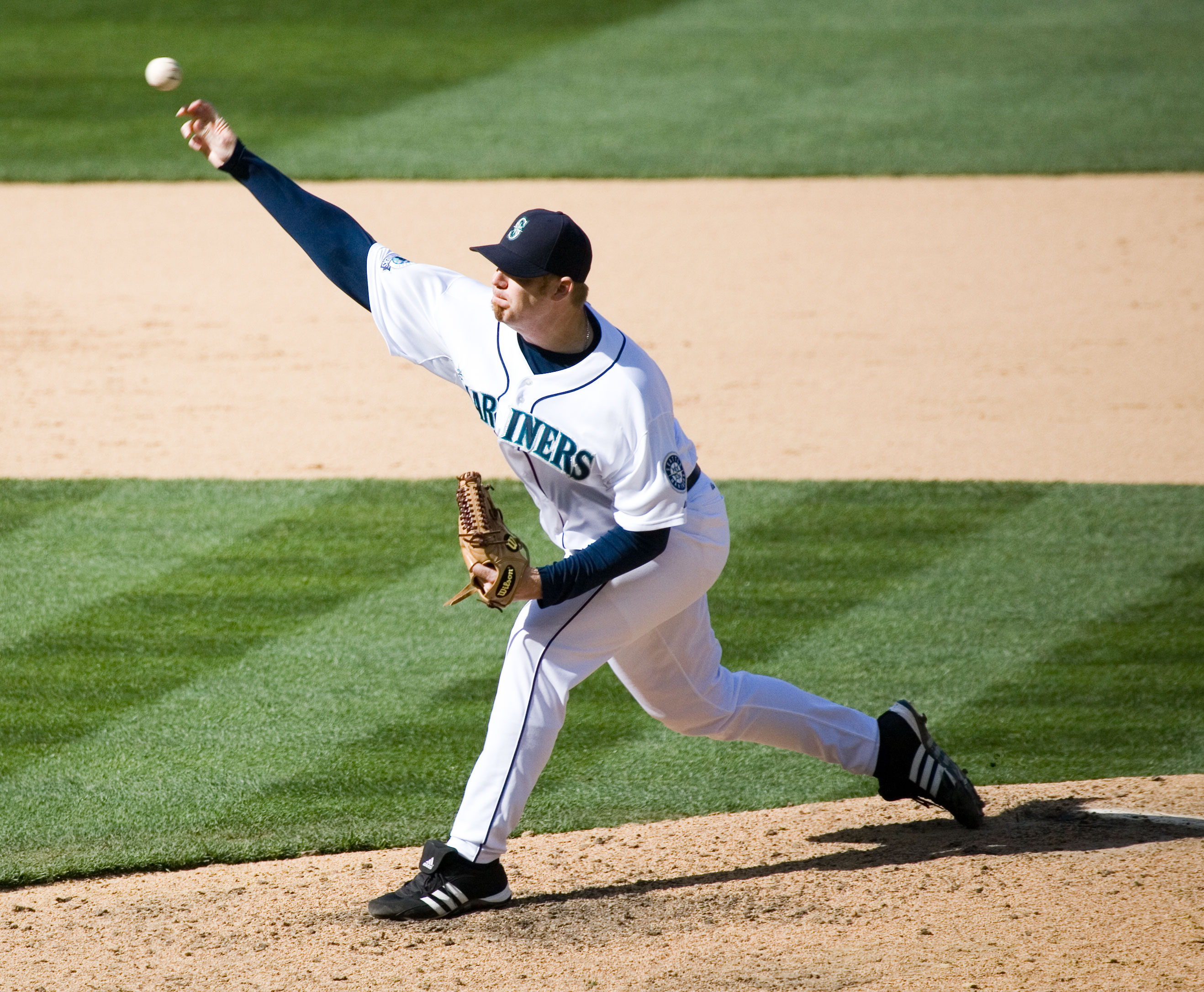
1999 Seattle Mariners draft picks
J. J. Putz (pictured) was the Mariners 6th round pick in 1999.
Information
Owner	Nintendo of America
General Manager(s)	Woody Woodward
Manager(s)	Lou Piniella
First pick	Ryan Christianson
Draft position	11th
Number of selections	52
Links
Results	Baseball-Reference
Official Site	The Official Site of the Seattle Mariners
Years	1998 • 1999 • 2000

The following is a list of 1999 Seattle Mariners draft picks. The Mariners took part in both the Rule 4 draft (June amateur draft) and the Rule 5 draft. The Mariners made 52 selections in the 1999 draft, the first being catcher Ryan Christianson in the first round. In all, the Mariners selected 29 pitchers, 8 outfielders, 6 shortstops, 3 catchers, 3 first basemen, 2 third basemen, and 1 second baseman.

== Draft ==
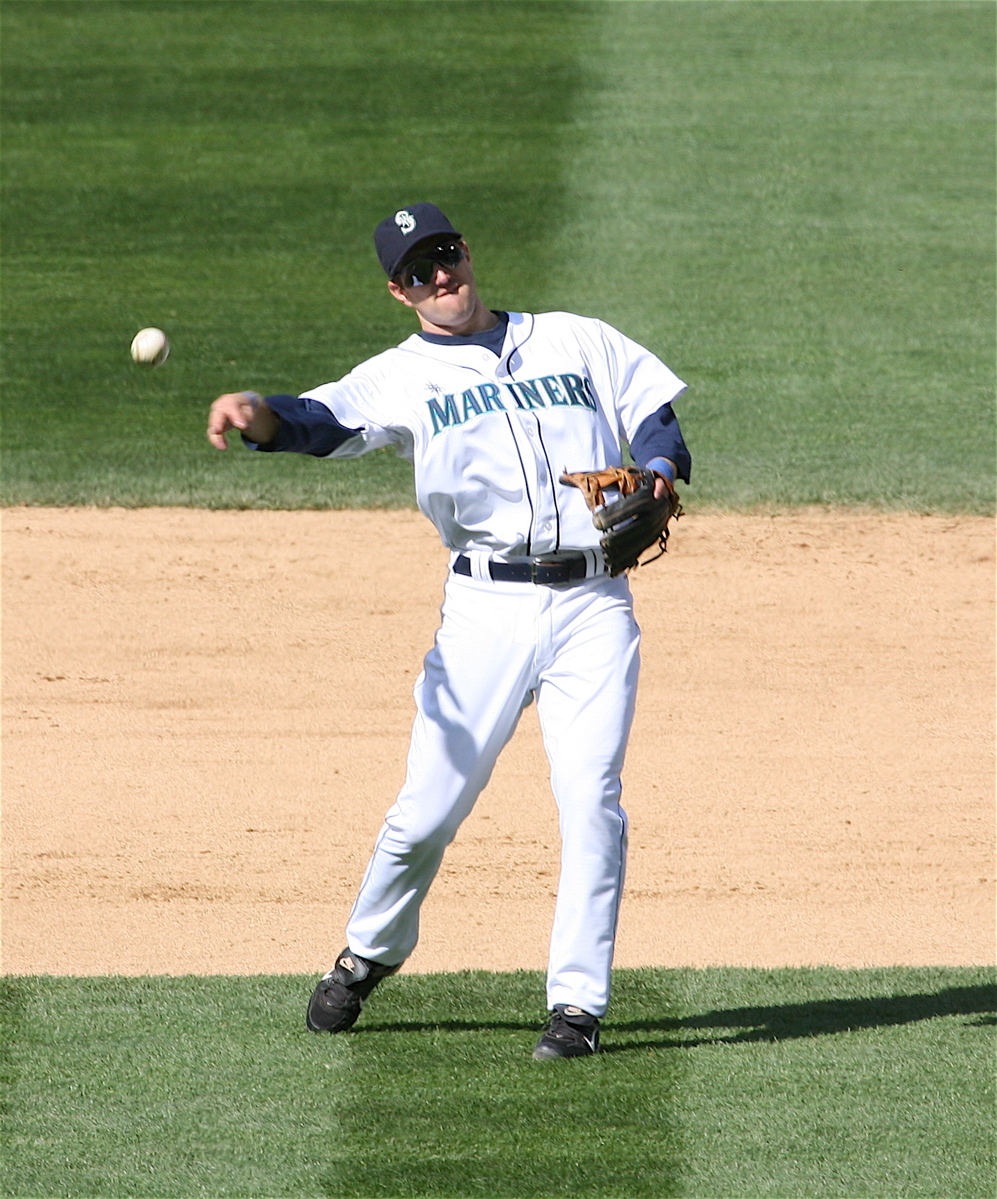
Willie Bloomquist was selected in the third round of the 1999 draft.

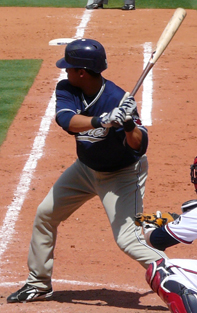
The Mariners selected Terrmel Sledge in the eighth round.

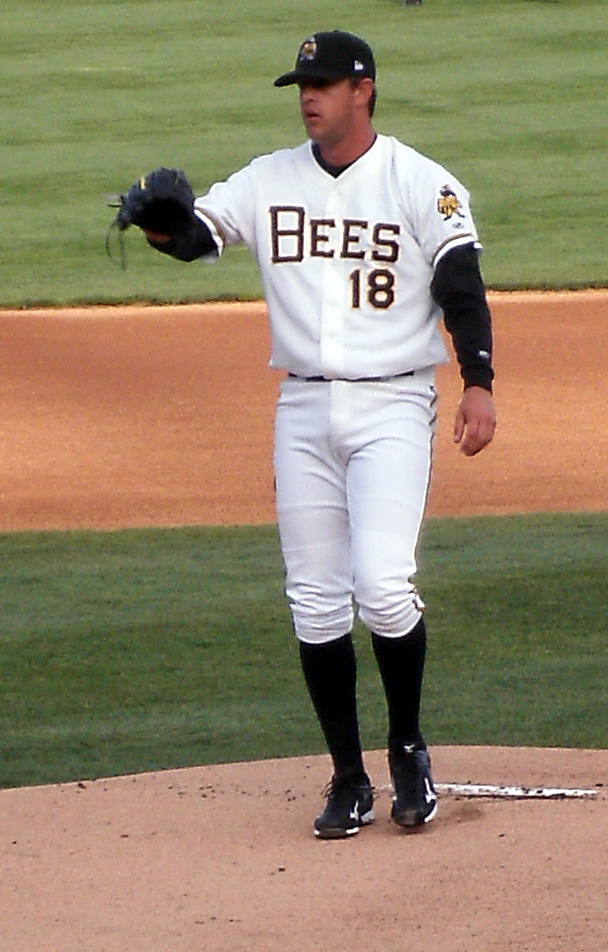
With the 755th pick in the 1999 draft the Mariners selected Daniel Davidson.

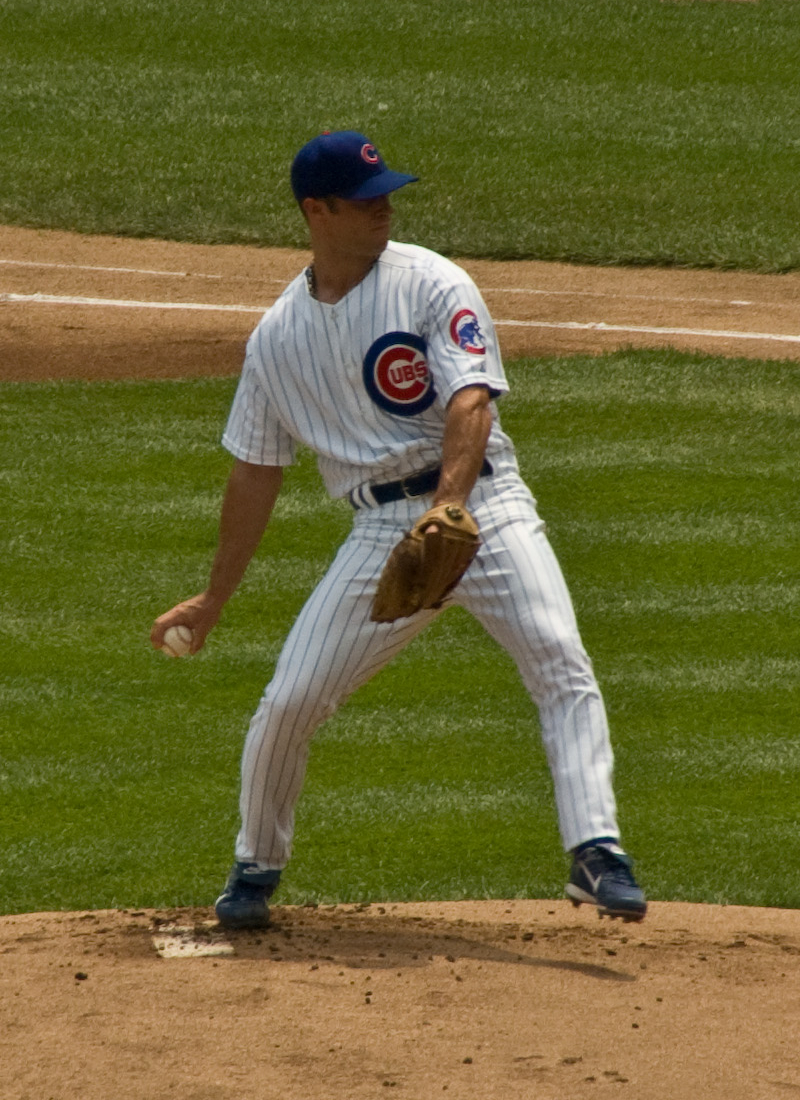
Rich Harden was the Mariners' 38th round pick.

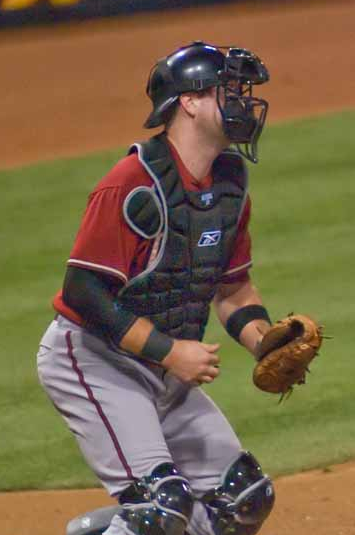
In the 43rd round the Mariners selected Chris Snyder.

=== Key ===
Round (Pick)	Indicates the round and pick the player was drafted
Position	Indicates the secondary/collegiate position at which the player was drafted, rather than the professional position the player may have gone on to play
**Bold**	Indicates the player signed with the Mariners
Italics	Indicates the player did not sign with the Mariners
*	Indicates the player made an appearance in Major League Baseball

=== Table ===
Round (Pick)	Name	Position	School	Source
1 (11)	**Ryan Christianson**	Catcher	Arlington High School	
1s (33)	**Jeff Heaverlo**	Right-handed pitcher	University of Washington	
3 (95)	**Willie Bloomquist**	Shortstop	Arizona State University	
3 (97)	**Sheldon Fulse**	Shortstop	George W. Jenkins High School	
4 (125)	**Vaughn Schill**	Shortstop	Duke University	
5 (155)	**Clint Nageotte**	Right-handed pitcher	Brooklyn High School	
6 (185)	**J. J. Putz**	Right-handed pitcher	University of Michigan	
7 (215)	Mike Davies	Left-handed pitcher	Westview High School	
8 (245)	**Terrmel Sledge**	Outfielder	California State University, Long Beach	
9 (275)	**Steven Kent**	Left-handed pitcher	Florida International University	
10 (305)	**Justin Smith**	Left-handed pitcher	University of Alabama	
11 (335)	**Hawkeye Wayne**	Right-handed pitcher	Columbia University	
12 (365)	Larry Brown	Outfielder	San Fernando High School	
13 (395)	**Justin Leone**	Shortstop	Saint Martin's University	
14 (425)	**Oscar Ramirez**	Shortstop	St. Petersburg College	
15 (455)	**O. J. Burton**	Right-handed pitcher	Florida Atlantic University	
16 (485)	**Sean Parnell**	Outfielder	University of Wisconsin–Madison	
17 (515)	**Brian Hertel**	First baseman	University of Nevada, Las Vegas	
18 (545)	**Kris Gundrum**	Outfielder	Western Michigan University	
19 (575)	**Brandon Roberson**	Right-handed pitcher	Texas Tech University	
20 (605)	**Kevin Olore**	Right-handed pitcher	Marist College	
21 (635)	**Craig Helmandollar**	Left-handed pitcher	Potomac State College	
22 (665)	**Jason Edmonds**	Right-handed pitcher	De Anza High School	
23 (695)	Zeph Zinsman	First baseman	Mission College	
24 (725)	**Ryan Simon**	Right-handed pitcher	George D. Chamberlain High School	
25 (755)	Daniel Davidson	Left-handed pitcher	A. Crawford Mosley High School	
26 (785)	**Matt Walter**	Right-handed pitcher	Brandon High School	
27 (815)	Andrew Rempel	Outfielder	W. J. Mouat Secondary School	
28 (845)	**Jonathan Kuelz**	Right-handed pitcher	Odessa College	
29 (875)	Lee Gwaltney	Right-handed pitcher	McLennan Community College	
30 (905)	**Michael Squibb**	Left-handed pitcher	South Hagerstown High School	
31 (935)	**Travis Allen**	Right-handed pitcher	Quartz Hill High School	
32 (965)	Andrew Wells	Right-handed pitcher	Mounds High School	
33 (995)	**Chuck Lopez**	Outfielder	California State University, Long Beach	
34 (1025)	**Christopher Bono**	Catcher	Brevard Community College	
35 (1055)	**Brian McDevitt**	Right-handed pitcher	Waubonsie Valley High School	
36 (1085)	**Eddy Menchaca**	Right-handed pitcher	Westwood High School	
37 (1115)	Glenn Tucker	Right-handed pitcher	Coral Shores High School	
38 (1145)	Rich Harden	Right-handed pitcher	Claremont Secondary School	
39 (1175)	**Derrik Dedge**	Shortstop	Suwannee High School	
40 (1205)	**Jeff Thompson**	Third baseman	Torrance High School	
41 (1235)	**Guarionez Rodriguez**	Second baseman	Miami Dade College	
42 (1263)	**Tyson Munn**	Outfielder	Earl Marriott Secondary School	
43 (1290)	Chris Snyder	Catcher	Spring Woods High School	
44 (1317)	**Steven Hassett**	Left-handed pitcher	Sarasota High School	
45 (1343)	Jon Nelson	Third baseman	Dixie State College	
46 (1367)	Benjamin Ashworth	Right-handed pitcher	Battle Ground Academy	
47 (1391)	**Jared Cudd**	Right-handed pitcher	Sentinel High School	
48 (1415)	**Shawn Brooks**	Right-handed pitcher	Lamar University	
49 (1438)	**Mark Leith**	Right-handed pitcher	David Thompson Secondary School	
50 (1460)	**Nate Doorlag**	First baseman	Plainwell High School	

== Rule 5 draft ==
=== Key ===
Pick	Indicates the pick the player was drafted
Previous team	Indicates the previous organization, not Minor league team

=== Table ===
Phase (Pick)	Name	Position	Previous team	Notes	Ref
Majors (10)	Chad Alexander	Outfielder	Houston Astros		
