= List of 1994 Seattle Mariners draft picks =

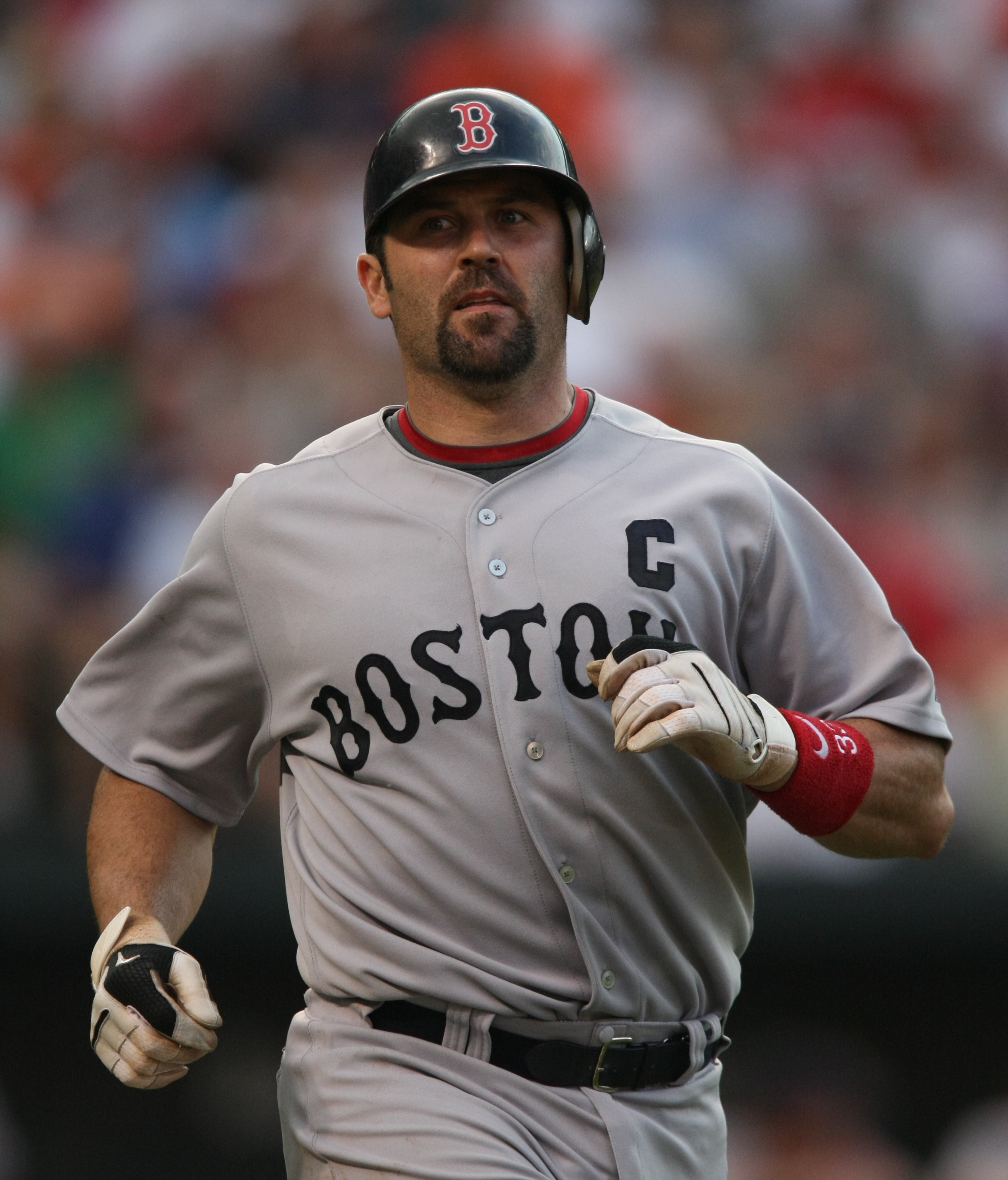
1994 Seattle Mariners draft picks
Jason Varitek (pictured) was the Mariners first round pick in 1994.
Information
Owner	Nintendo of America
General Manager(s)	Woody Woodward
Manager(s)	Lou Piniella
First pick	Jason Varitek
Draft position	14th
Number of selections	75
Links
Results	Baseball-Reference
Official Site	The Official Site of the Seattle Mariners
Years	1993 • 1994 • 1995

The following is a list of 1994 Seattle Mariners draft picks. The Mariners took part in the June regular draft, also known as the Rule 4 draft. The Mariners made 75 selections in the 1994 draft, the first being catcher Jason Varitek in the first round. In all, the Mariners selected 29 pitchers, 24 outfielders, 10 catchers, 5 shortstops, 4 third basemen, and 3 first basemen.

== Draft ==
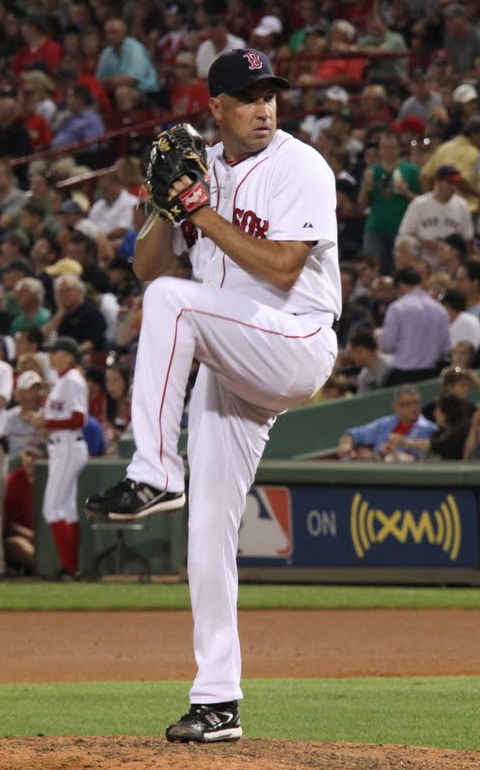
Scott Atchison was the Mariners' 36th round pick of the 1994 draft.

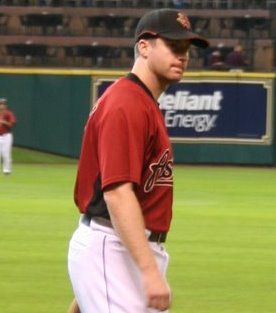
The Mariners 61st round pick in 1994 was Morgan Ensberg.

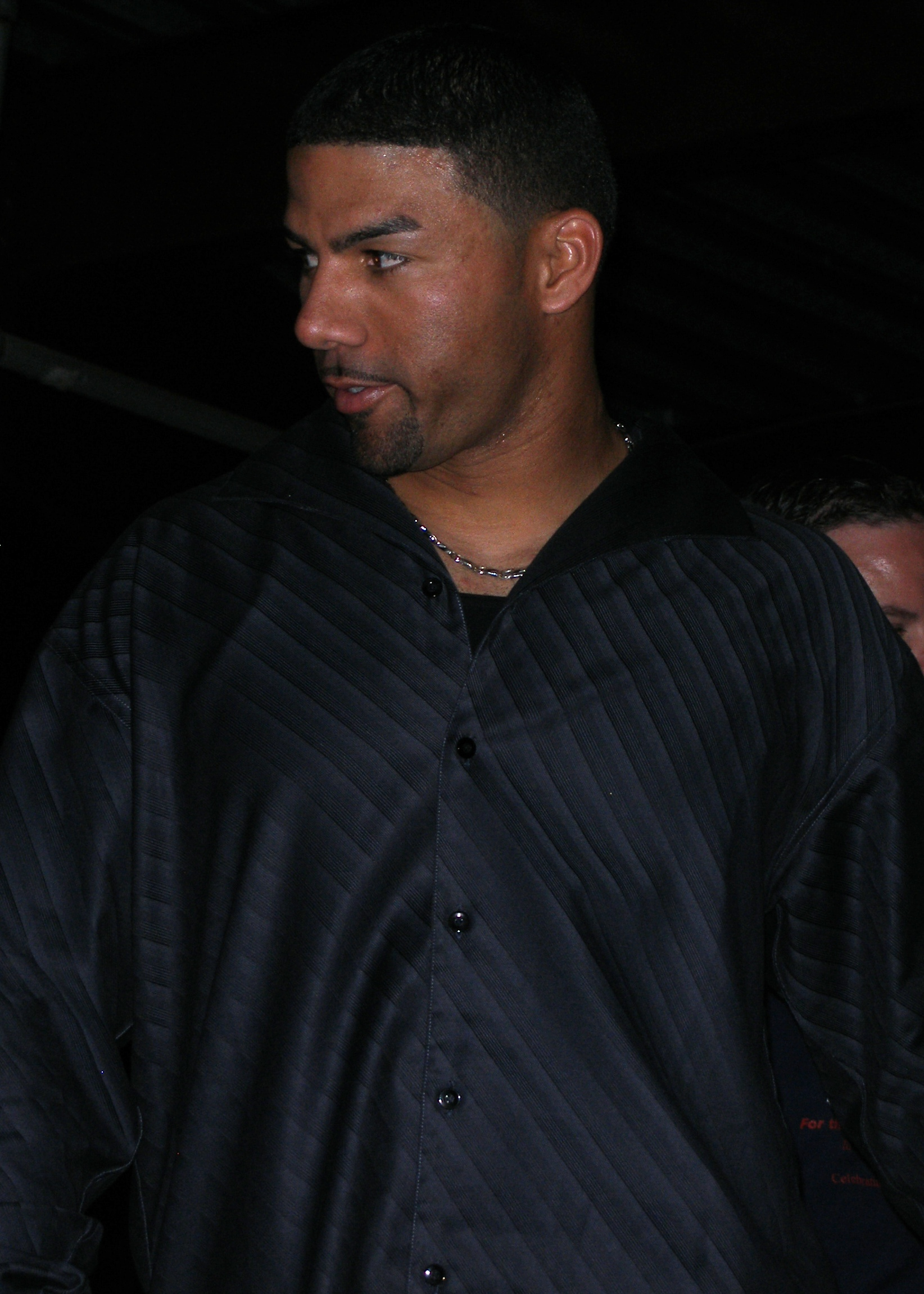
With the 1608th pick in the 1994 draft the Mariners selected J. C. Romero.

=== Key ===
Round (Pick)	Indicates the round and pick the player was drafted
Position	Indicates the secondary/collegiate position at which the player was drafted, rather than the professional position the player may have gone on to play
**Bold**	Indicates the player signed with the Mariners
Italics	Indicates the player did not sign with the Mariners
*	Indicates the player made an appearance in Major League Baseball

=== Table ===
Round (Pick)	Name	Position	School	Source
1 (14)	**Jason Varitek**	Catcher	Georgia Institute of Technology	
2 (48)	**Trey Moore**	Left-handed pitcher	Texas A&M University	
3 (77)	**Matt Wagner**	Right-handed pitcher	Iowa State University	
4 (105)	**Mike Burrows**	Outfielder	American Fork High School	
5 (133)	**Tom Szimanski**	Right-handed pitcher	Florida Southern College	
6 (161)	**Joe Mays**	Right-handed pitcher	Southeast High School	
7 (189)	**Chris Beck**	Right-handed pitcher	The Master's College	
8 (217)	Dwayne Dobson	Right-handed pitcher	Clearwater High School	
9 (245)	**James Rowson**	Left-handed pitcher	Mount Saint Michael Academy	
10 (273)	**Doug Carroll**	Outfielder	University of South Florida	
11 (301)	**Carlos Rose**	Outfielder	Cleveland High School	
12 (329)	**Eric Clifford**	Right-handed pitcher	Mesa Community College	
13 (357)	**Roy Smith**	Right-handed pitcher	Dixie M. Hollins High School	
14 (385)	**Frank Sanders**	Outfielder	Auburn University	
15 (413)	**Jason Ruskey**	Left-handed pitcher	Arizona State University	
16 (441)	**Anthony Southern**	Outfielder	Whiteville High School	
17 (469)	Mike Martin	Catcher	Florida State University	
18 (497)	**Colin Hinds**	Outfielder	Loyola Marymount University	
19 (525)	**Cy Simonton**	Outfielder	Pittsburg High School	
20 (553)	Gus Ornstein	First baseman	Ethical Culture Fieldston School	
21 (581)	**Eric Morgan**	Right-handed pitcher	University of Miami	
22 (609)	**Osvaldo Fernandez**	Left-handed pitcher	Mission College	
23 (637)	**Kevin Trimble**	Outfielder	Mattoon High School	
24 (665)	**Adonis Harrison**	Shortstop	Muir High School	
25 (693)	**Matt Sachse**	Left-handed pitcher	Joel E. Ferris High School	
26 (721)	**Rick Ladjevich**	Third baseman	University of Central Missouri	
27 (749)	**Shane Thomason**	Shortstop	Chattanooga State Community College	
28 (777)	**Kyle Towner**	Outfielder	University of Alabama at Birmingham	
29 (805)	**Shawn Buhner**	First baseman	Lewis–Clark State College	
30 (833)	**Marcus Williams**	Right-handed pitcher	Henry Ford II High School	
31 (861)	**Randy Vickers**	Shortstop	Glendale Community College	
32 (889)	**Jordan Zimmerman**	Left-handed pitcher	Blinn College	
33 (917)	**Jason Hill**	Catcher	Cerritos College	
34 (945)	Todd Ozias	Right-handed pitcher	J. P. Taravella High School	
35 (973)	Chris Hayes	Third baseman	Jacksonville University	
36 (1001)	Scott Atchison	Right-handed pitcher	McCullough High School	
37 (1029)	Johnathan Rose	Left-handed pitcher	Eastern Alamance High School	
38 (1057)	**James Bowman**	Left-handed pitcher	Green River Community College	
39 (1085)	Michael Rooney	Right-handed pitcher	North Rockland High School	
40 (1112)	Matt Garrick	Catcher	Duncanville High School	
41 (1138)	**Shane Heams**	Outfielder	Bedford Senior High School	
42 (1164)	**Brian Saltarelli**	Outfielder	El Toro High School	
43 (1190)	**Gus Rubio**	Catcher	El Camino College	
44 (1216)	Greg Scheer	Left-handed pitcher	Jacksonville University	
45 (1242)	**Kyle Kennedy**	Right-handed pitcher	Mississippi State University	
46 (1266)	**Marvin Fowler**	Outfielder	Palatka High School	
47 (1289)	**Greg Goligoski**	Outfielder	Prescott High School	
48 (1310)	**Richard Nunez**	Right-handed pitcher	Gulliver Preparatory School	
49 (1330)	**Brandon Butler**	Outfielder	Hardin County High School	
50 (1350)	Derek Nicholson	Catcher	Torrance High School	
51 (1370)	**Stephen Bagby**	Outfielder	Glen Oaks Community College	
52 (1390)	**Brad Smith**	Third baseman	Marina High School	
53 (1409)	**Saladin McCulough**	Outfielder	Pasadena High School	
54 (1428)	**Warren Tisdale**	Right-handed pitcher	Mandarin High School	
55 (1445)	**Brad Marshall**	Outfielder	College of San Mateo	
56 (1461)	**Jermain Jordan**	Outfielder	Vidalia Comprehensive High School	
57 (1477)	**Scott Needham**	Catcher	Butler Community College	
58 (1493)	Tim Hill	Right-handed pitcher	John A. Logan College	
59 (1508)	**Ramon Arias**	First baseman	Lompoc High School	
60 (1521)	**Albert Derenches**	Left-handed pitcher	Gaither High School	
61 (1534)	Morgan Ensberg	Shortstop	Redondo Union High School	
62 (1546)	**Lucas Solomon**	Right-handed pitcher	Canyon High School	
63 (1558)	**Kevin High**	Outfielder	Palm Desert High School	
64 (1570)	**Richard Mora**	Right-handed pitcher	Cypress Creek High School	
65 (1581)	**Shelby Johnson**	Catcher	Holmes Community College	
66 (1590)	David Waites	Right-handed pitcher	McCullough High School	
67 (1599)	**Jose Gonzales**	Catcher	Seminole State College of Florida	
68 (1608)	J. C. Romero	Outfielder	Berwind Superior School	
69 (1617)	**Kyle Rask**	Outfielder	Redmond High School	
70 (1625)	Gerald Eady	Outfielder	Robert E. Lee High School	
71 (1633)	**John Lauderdale**	Catcher	Tustin High School	
72 (1641)	Toby Sanchez	Outfielder	Rancho Santiago College	
73 (1648)	Jose Montenegro	Shortstop	South Gate High School	
74 (1655)	Leron Cook	Outfielder	Theodore Roosevelt High School	
75 (1662)	**Steve Rawson**	Third baseman	Redondo Union High School	
