= List of 1991 Seattle Mariners draft picks =

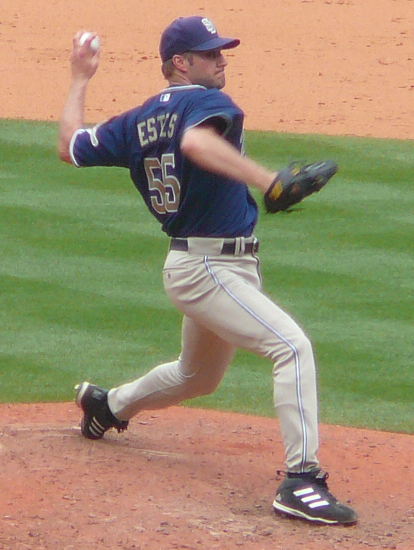
1991 Seattle Mariners draft picks
Shawn Estes (pictured) was the Mariners first round pick in 1991.
Information
| Owner | Jeff Smulyan |
| General Manager(s) | Woody Woodward |
| Manager(s) | Jim Lefebvre |
| First pick | Shawn Estes |
| Draft position | 11th |
| Number of selections | 67 |
Links
| Results | Baseball-Reference |
| Official Site | The Official Site of the Seattle Mariners |
| Years | 1990 • 1991 • 1992 |

The following is a list of 1991 Seattle Mariners draft picks. The Mariners took part in the June regular draft, also known as the Rule 4 draft. The Mariners made 67 selections in the 1991 draft, the first being left-handed pitcher Shawn Estes in the first round. In all, the Mariners selected 33 pitchers, 14 outfielders, 12 shortstops, 6 catchers, 1 first baseman, and 1 third baseman.

== Draft ==
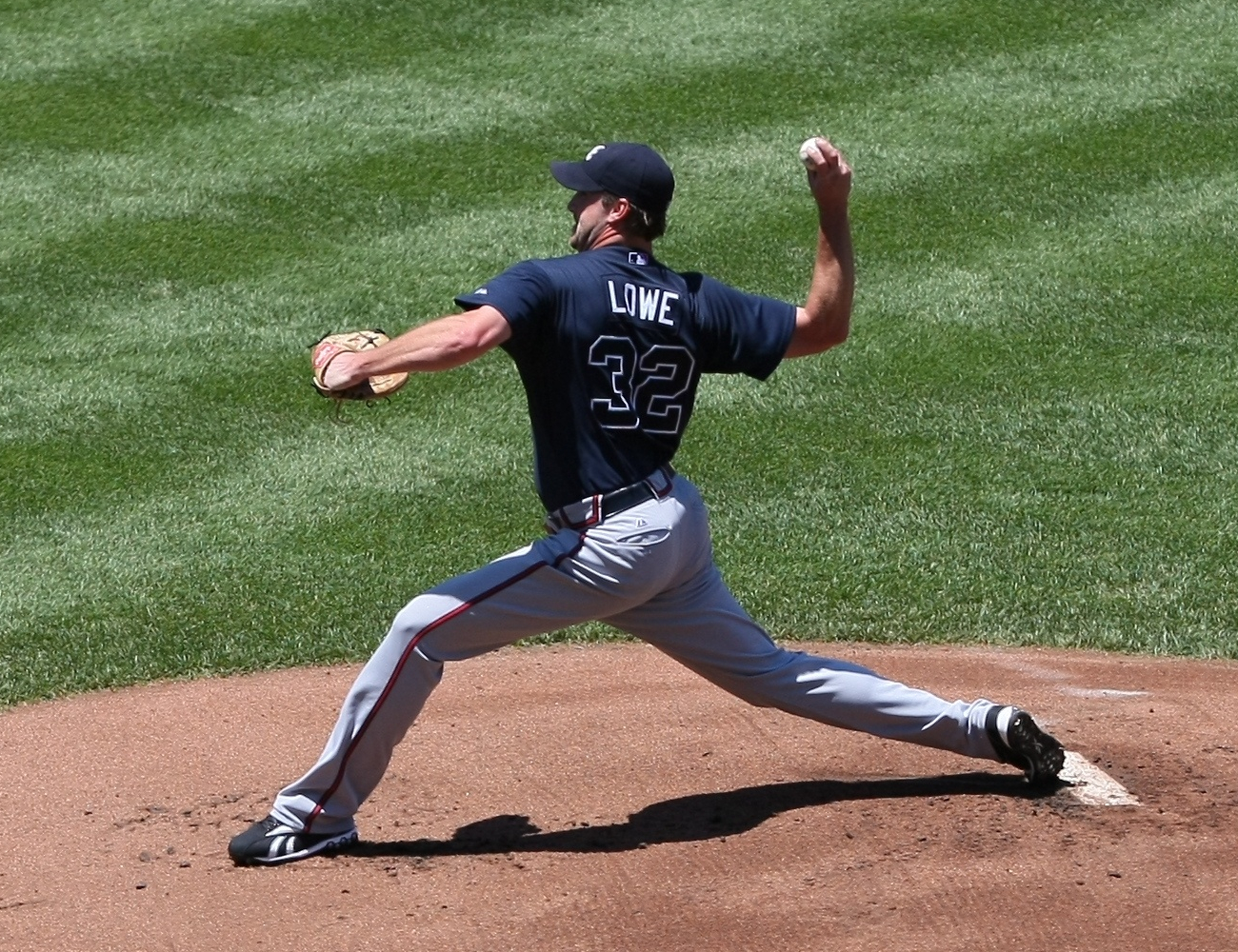
Derek Lowe was selected in the eighth round by the Mariners.

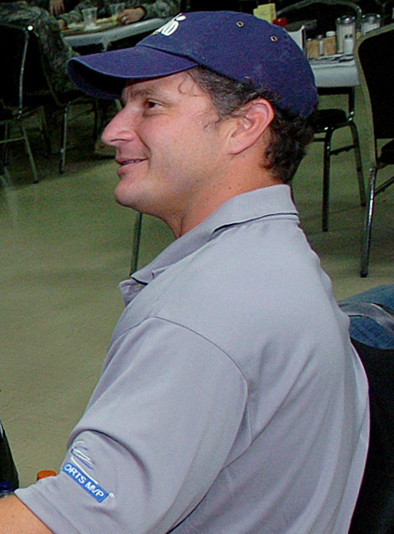
The Mariners selected Darren Bragg in the 22nd round of the 1991 draft.

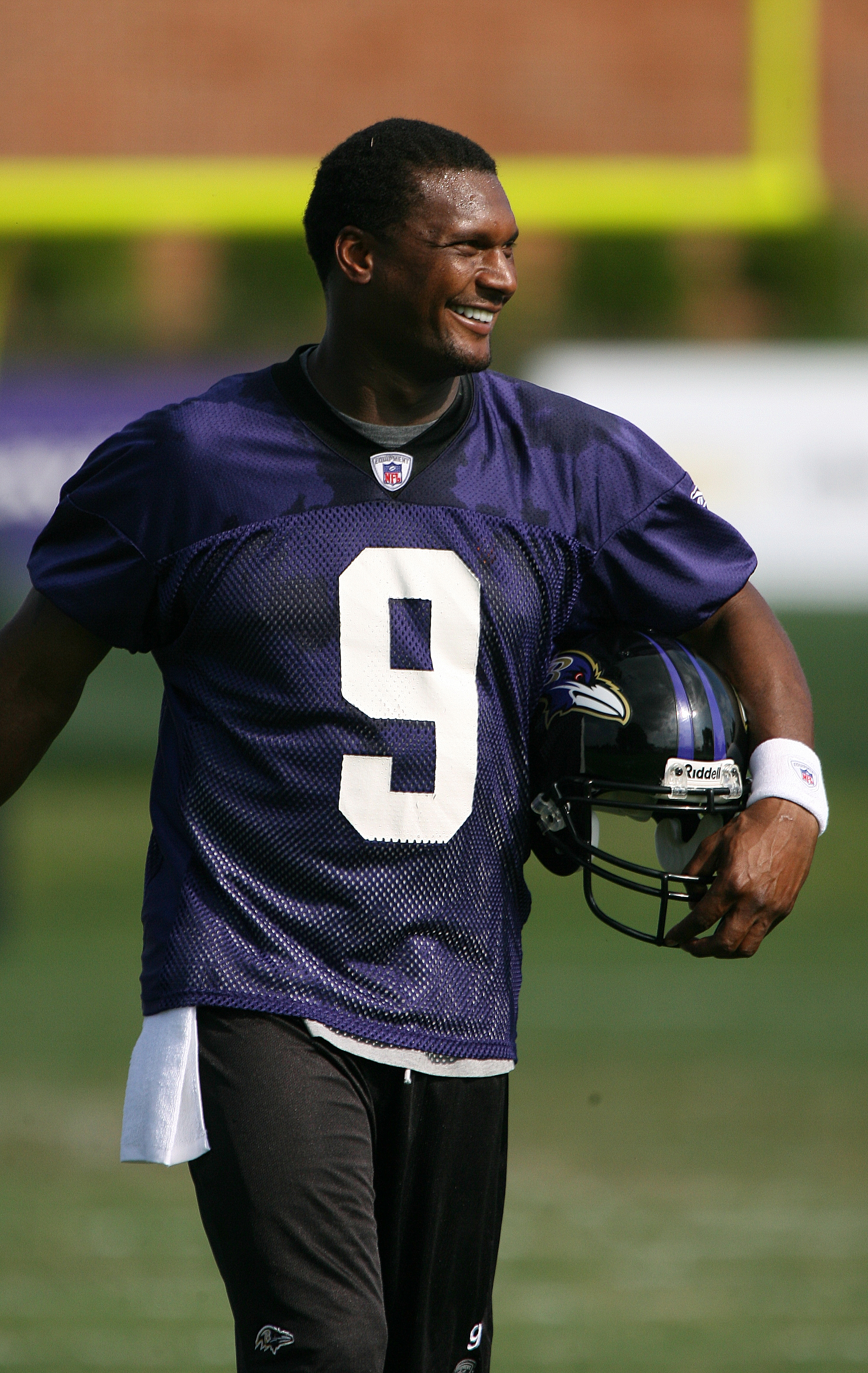
In the 35th round the Mariners selected Steve McNair.

=== Key ===
| Round (Pick) | Indicates the round and pick the player was drafted |
| Position | Indicates the secondary/collegiate position at which the player was drafted, rather than the professional position the player may have gone on to play |
| **Bold** | Indicates the player signed with the Mariners |
| Italics | Indicates the player did not sign with the Mariners |
| * | Indicates the player made an appearance in Major League Baseball |

=== Table ===
| Round (Pick) | Name | Position | School | Source |
|---|---|---|---|---|
| 1 (11) | **Shawn Estes** | Left-handed pitcher | Douglas High School | |
| 2 (55) | **Tommy Adams** | Outfielder | Arizona State University | |
| 3 (84) | **Jim Mecir** | Right-handed pitcher | Eckerd College | |
| 4 (110) | **Desi Relaford** | Shortstop | Sandalwood High School | |
| 5 (136) | **Sean Rees** | Left-handed pitcher | Arizona State University | |
| 6 (162) | **Craig Clayton** | Right-handed pitcher | California State University, Northridge | |
| 7 (188) | Bruce Thompson | Outfielder | Brandon High School | |
| 8 (213) | **Derek Lowe** | Right-handed pitcher | Ford High School | |
| 9 (240) | **Trey Witte** | Right-handed pitcher | Texas A&M University | |
| 10 (266) | **Jeff Borski** | Right-handed pitcher | University of South Carolina Aiken | |
| 11 (292) | **Peter Weinbaum** | Right-handed pitcher | Nassau Community College | |
| 12 (318) | **David Lisiecki** | Right-handed pitcher | Lake Michigan College | |
| 13 (344) | **Kevin Jenkins** | Right-handed pitcher | Riverview Community High School | |
| 14 (370) | **Raul Rodarte** | Shortstop | Rancho Santiago College | |
| 15 (396) | **Doug Anderson** | Left-handed pitcher | University of North Florida | |
| 16 (422) | **Dan Sullivan** | Right-handed pitcher | Indian River State College | |
| 17 (448) | **Kenny Winzer** | Right-handed pitcher | Southern University | |
| 18 (474) | **Craig Bryant** | Shortstop | University of North Alabama | |
| 19 (500) | **Tony Phillips** | Right-handed pitcher | University of Southern Mississippi | |
| 20 (526) | **Erik O'Donnell** | Right-handed pitcher | University of Portland | |
| 21 (552) | **Toby Foreman** | Left-handed pitcher | Saint Mary's College of California | |
| 22 (578) | **Darren Bragg** | Outfielder | Georgia Institute of Technology | |
| 23 (604) | Joseph Gazarek | Outfielder | North Baltimore High School | |
| 24 (630) | **Paul London** | Shortstop | Bethel High School | |
| 25 (656) | **Matt Mantei** | Right-handed pitcher | River Valley High School | |
| 26 (682) | **Charles Smith** | First baseman | University of Illinois at Urbana–Champaign | |
| 27 (708) | Todd Cady | Catcher | Grossmont High School | |
| 28 (734) | **James Riggio** | Right-handed pitcher | Hillsborough Community College | |
| 29 (760) | Chad Soden | Left-handed pitcher | Tuckerman High School | |
| 30 (786) | **Edward Odom** | Shortstop | Atlantic Community High School | |
| 31 (812) | **Ryan Black** | Outfielder | Sam Houston High School | |
| 32 (838) | **George Glinatsis** | Right-handed pitcher | University of Cincinnati | |
| 33 (864) | **Byron Thomas** | Outfielder | Community College of Baltimore County | |
| 34 (890) | **Michael Martin** | Shortstop | Maclay School | |
| 35 (916) | **Steve McNair** | Shortstop | Mount Olive High School | |
| 36 (942) | **Andrew Schope** | Left-handed pitcher | Hempstead High School | |
| 37 (968) | **Daniel Scutchfield** | Left-handed pitcher | Saline High School | |
| 38 (994) | **Damian Cox** | Outfielder | Victor Valley High School | |
| 39 (1020) | Kevin Faircloth | Shortstop | Robert B. Glenn High School | |
| 40 (1046) | **Lance Scott** | Right-handed pitcher | Carmel High School | |
| 41 (1071) | Lenny Weber | Right-handed pitcher | Jeanerette High School | |
| 42 (1096) | Craig Griffey | Outfielder | Ohio State University | |
| 43 (1121) | Ryan Nye | Right-handed pitcher | Cameron High School | |
| 44 (1146) | **Chris Gorr** | Shortstop | Rancho Buena Vista High School | |
| 45 (1171) | **John Thompson** | Shortstop | Shadle Park High School | |
| 46 (1196) | **Federico Warner** | Outfielder | Oceanside High School | |
| 47 (1221) | **William Lewis** | Catcher | East Carteret High School | |
| 48 (1245) | **Nicholas Williams** | Catcher | Hastings High School | |
| 49 (1267) | Tyson Kimm | Shortstop | Norway High School | |
| 50 (1288) | **Jelani Lewis** | Outfielder | James Logan High School | |
| 51 (1309) | **Mark Fields** | Outfielder | Southwestern College | |
| 52 (1330) | **Bryan Pfeifer** | Left-handed pitcher | John F. Kennedy High School | |
| 53 (1350) | **Jeff Tucker** | Right-handed pitcher | Allen Community College | |
| 54 (1369) | **Gregory Theron** | Right-handed pitcher | Dobson High School | |
| 55 (1386) | Jason Beverlin | Right-handed pitcher | Dondero High School | |
| 56 (1402) | **Jose Cruz** | Third baseman | San Jacinto College | |
| 57 (1418) | **Francisco Antunez** | Catcher | Papa Juan XXIII School | |
| 58 (1432) | **Scott Bosarge** | Catcher | University of South Alabama | |
| 59 (1446) | Chris Schmitt | Left-handed pitcher | State College of Florida, Manatee–Sarasota | |
| 60 (1458) | **Rudolph Sasina** | Catcher | Overland High School | |
| 61 (1470) | **Edward Davis** | Outfielder | Cerritos College | |
| 62 (1482) | James Lezeau | Outfielder | Prescott High School | |
| 63 (1493) | **Charles Gipson** | Outfielder | Loara High School | |
| 64 (1501) | **Brian Klomp** | Right-handed pitcher | Reedley College | |
| 65 (1508) | **Shane Ziegler** | Right-handed pitcher | Howard College | |
| 66 (1515) | **Brian Fontes** | Right-handed pitcher | Fresno City College | |
| 67 (1522) | Darian Hagan | Shortstop | University of Colorado at Boulder | |
