= List of 1993 Seattle Mariners draft picks =

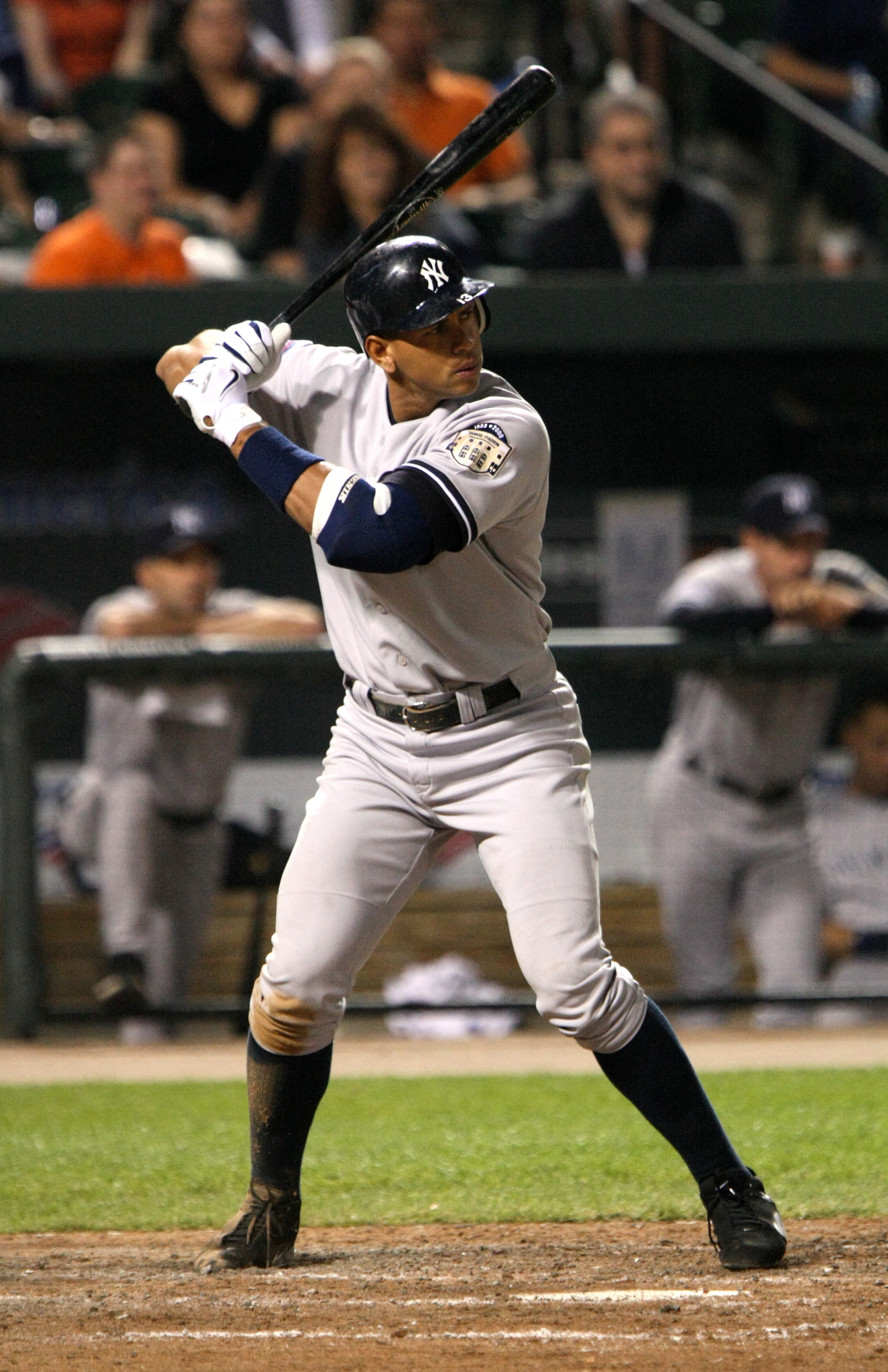
1993 Seattle Mariners draft picks
Alex Rodriguez (pictured) was the Mariners first round pick in 1993.
Information
Owner	Nintendo of America
General Manager(s)	Woody Woodward
Manager(s)	Lou Piniella
First pick	Alex Rodriguez
Draft position	1st
Number of selections	69
Links
Results	Baseball-Reference
Official Site	The Official Site of the Seattle Mariners
Years	1992 • 1993 • 1994

The following is a list of 1993 Seattle Mariners draft picks. The Mariners took part in the June regular draft, also known as the Rule 4 draft. The Mariners made 69 selections in the 1993 draft, the first being shortstop Alex Roidriguez, now in the 3,000 hit club, in the first round. In all, the Mariners selected 37 pitchers, 13 outfielders, 7 catchers, 6 shortstops, 2 first basemen, 2 second basemen, and 2 third basemen.

== Draft ==
=== Key ===
Round (Pick)	Indicates the round and pick the player was drafted
Position	Indicates the secondary/collegiate position at which the player was drafted, rather than the professional position the player may have gone on to play
**Bold**	Indicates the player signed with the Mariners
Italics	Indicates the player did not sign with the Mariners
*	Indicates the player made an appearance in Major League Baseball

=== Table ===
Round (Pick)	Name	Position	School	Source
1 (1)	**Alex Rodriguez**	Shortstop	Westminster Christian School	
3 (73)	**Ed Randolph**	Third baseman	Franklin D. Roosevelt High School (Dallas)	
4 (101)	**Mike Collett**	Right-handed pitcher	University of Southern California	
5 (129)	**David Cooper**	Right-handed pitcher	Hesperia High School	
6 (157)	**Ken Cloude**	Right-handed pitcher	McDonogh School	
7 (185)	**Tim Schweitzer**	Left-handed pitcher	University of Arizona	
8 (213)	**Greg Hillengas**	Outfielder	Seminole High School	
9 (241)	**Robert Krueger**	Left-handed pitcher	Western Michigan University	
10 (269)	**Dean Crow**	Right-handed pitcher	Baylor University	
11 (297)	**Casey Craig**	Right-handed pitcher	Napoleon High School	
12 (325)	**Randy Jorgensen**	First baseman	University of Washington	
13 (353)	**Rafael Carmona**	Right-handed pitcher	Indian Hills Community College	
14 (381)	**Brian Sosa**	Right-handed pitcher	San Bernardino Valley College	
15 (409)	**Chris Green**	Right-handed pitcher	Grossmont College	
16 (437)	**John Daniels**	Right-handed pitcher	Mt. San Antonio College	
17 (465)	**Chad Dunavan**	Outfielder	Howard College	
18 (493)	**Tim Bruce**	Right-handed pitcher	University of Detroit Mercy	
19 (521)	Douglas Forde	Left-handed pitcher	Riverview High School	
20 (549)	**Chris Dean**	Second baseman	Seminole State College of Florida	
21 (577)	**Chris Dumas**	Outfielder	Alabama Southern Community College	
22 (605)	**Matt Apana**	Right-handed pitcher	University of Hawaii	
23 (633)	**Mike Barger**	Outfielder	Saint Louis University	
24 (661)	**Joe Berube**	Catcher	Presbyterian College	
25 (689)	**Daleon Isom**	Outfielder	Benton Harbor High School	
26 (717)	**Russell Jacob**	Right-handed pitcher	Winter Haven High School	
27 (745)	**Joe Mathis**	Shortstop	Strom Thurmond High School	
28 (773)	**Jon Updike**	Right-handed pitcher	Pensacola State College	
29 (801)	**Andy Augustine**	Catcher	Triton College	
30 (829)	**Manny Patel**	Second baseman	Yale University	
31 (857)	Brandon Hoalton	Right-handed pitcher	Rancho Santiago College	
32 (885)	**John Tejcek**	Outfielder	University of Arizona	
33 (913)	Christopher Parker	Right-handed pitcher	J. M. Tate High School	
34 (941)	**Grant Jondahl**	Right-handed pitcher	Amador Valley High School	
35 (969)	John White	Catcher	University Christian School	
36 (997)	**Willie Wilkins**	Outfielder	Atlantic Community High School	
37 (1025)	**Brad Brasser**	Right-handed pitcher	Grand Rapids Christian High School	
38 (1053)	**Kelvin Mitchell**	Left-handed pitcher	Choctaw County High School	
39 (1081)	**Brandon Kleitch**	Outfielder	Cibola High School	
40 (1109)	**Anibal Ramirez**	Shortstop	Miami Dade College (Wolfson Campus)	
41 (1137)	Chris Champanois	Catcher	Columbia Central High School	
42 (1165)	**Heath Webster**	Right-handed pitcher	Peninsula High School	
43 (1193)	**Matthew Wimmer**	Outfielder	University of Washington	
44 (1220)	**Thomas Redd**	Outfielder	El Camino College	
45 (1246)	Jeremy Morris	Catcher	Robert F. Munroe High School	
46 (1271)	**Johnny Cardenas**	Catcher	Texas Christian University	
47 (1295)	Marcus Jones	Right-handed pitcher	Esperanza High School	
48 (1319)	**Bryan Belflower**	Right-handed pitcher	Oak Ridge High School	
49 (1343)	**Jeremy Reeves**	Left-handed pitcher	Lincoln Trail College	
50 (1366)	Jeff Harris	Right-handed pitcher	Contra Costa College	
51 (1388)	**Roy Miller**	Shortstop	Washington State University	
52 (1409)	**Ryan Mullen**	Right-handed pitcher	Boca Ciega High School	
53 (1430)	**Kevin McCoy**	Right-handed pitcher	Triton College	
54 (1451)	Matt Wise	Right-handed pitcher	Bonita High School	
55 (1471)	**Jason Cook**	Shortstop	University of Virginia	
56 (1491)	**Chris Knowles**	First baseman	Blinn College	
57 (1510)	John Romero	Right-handed pitcher	San Fernando High School	
58 (1528)	**Chris Kelly**	Left-handed pitcher	Alexander Hamilton High School	
59 (1544)	**Ricky Tutson**	Outfielder	Willow Run High School	
60 (1559)	Barret Markey	Right-handed pitcher	St. Petersburg High School	
61 (1573)	**Robert Coddington**	Catcher	Grossmont High School	
62 (1585)	**Michael Rodgers**	Left-handed pitcher	East Richland High School	
63 (1595)	**Arnold Brathwarte**	Shortstop	St. Joseph's High School	
64 (1604)	Justin Bice	Right-handed pitcher	Kentwood High School	
65 (1613)	**Scott Smith**	Outfielder	Texas A&M University	
66 (1621)	**Aaron Keal**	Right-handed pitcher	Labette Community College	
67 (1628)	George Rayborn	Right-handed pitcher	Purvis High School	
68 (1635)	**Cirilo Cruz**	Third baseman	Miami Dade College	
69 (1641)	**Rob Ippolito**	Right-handed pitcher	University of Arizona	
70 (1647)	Jonathan Choate	Outfielder	Blinn College	
