= Ryan Anderson (baseball) =

American baseball player (born 1979)

- Pitcher
- Born: July 12, 1979 (age 46); Southfield, Michigan, U.S.
- Bats: Left Throws: Left
- Stats at Baseball Reference
Medals
Men's baseball
Representing United States
Pan American Games
Silver medal – second place	1999 Winnipeg	Team

Ryan York Anderson (born July 12, 1979) is an American former professional baseball player. Anderson was a left-handed pitcher in the Seattle Mariners and Milwaukee Brewers minor league systems from 1997 to 2005.

== Career ==
After attending Divine Child High School, Anderson was drafted in the first round by the Mariners in the 1997 MLB draft. He signed for a $2.175 million signing bonus. Baseball America called him the team's top prospect every year from 1998 to 2002 and the top prospect in the Pacific Coast League in 2000.

After a series of injuries (which prevented him from pitching from 2001 to 2004) and questions regarding his diligence, Anderson retired from baseball after briefly attempting a comeback with the Brewers in 2005.

== Personal life ==
At 6'10, Anderson drew frequent comparisons to former Mariners pitcher Randy Johnson due to similarities in their height and pitching style, and earned Anderson the nickname "The Little Unit", a play on Johnson's nickname "The Big Unit".

After ending his baseball career, Anderson pursued a career as a chef, attending the Scottsdale Culinary Institute.
