= MV Skookum =

MV Skookum is the name of two ferries, both of which operated on Okanagan Lake in British Columbia, Canada:

- MV Skookum (1906)
- MV Skookum (1912)
