= Lily of the Valley (boat) =

Lily of the Valley was a houseboat owned by pioneer John Moore Robinson, who founded the community of Naramata, British Columbia. He and his family traveled across Okanagan Lake to the newly laid out town site in Lily of the Valley on April 22, 1907 and Naramata was officially founded. She was moored at the wharf on the west shore of the lake and later hosted festivities such as regatta activities by the Athletic and Aquatic Association, holding 800 people at one point in 1909.

== See also ==
- Colleen (rowboat)
- Ruth Shorts
