= SS Mary Victoria Greenhow =

Canadian steamboat

History

Canada
- Namesake: Mary Victoria Greenhow
- Builder: Thomas Shorts; Thomas Greenhow
- Launched: 21 April 1886

General characteristics
- Length: 32 ft (9.8 m)
- Beam: 5 ft (1.5 m)
- Installed power: 2 hp (1.5 kW)
- Capacity: 5 passengers

SS Mary Victoria Greenhow (MVG) was the first steamboat on Okanagan Lake in British Columbia, Canada. She was built by Captain Thomas Shorts and Thomas Greenhow and although she was not perfect, she was the harbinger of a long and significant line of steamships in the Okanagan.

== Construction ==
Shorts had begun the boating service on the lake with his rowboat Ruth Shorts in 1883 and three years later, he decided to venture into steam. He convinced the pioneer and rancher Thomas Ellis that it would be cheaper to transport freight by water than by packtrain from Hope, British Columbia, so with financial assistance from the cattle rancher Thomas Greenhow, Shorts was able to begin steamboating. Mary Victoria Greenhow was the first powered vessel on the lake and Shorts launched her on April 21, 1886 at the shipyard at Okanagan Landing. She was 32 feet (9.8 m) long by 5 feet (1.5 m) in beam and could carry five passengers and five tons of freight, with a two horsepower engine and a kerosene-burning boiler manufactured in Rochester, New York. Mary Victoria Greenhow was named after the only daughter of Thomas and Elizabeth Greenhow.

=== First trip ===
Mary Victoria Greenhow was clumsy and Shorts ran out of fuel halfway on her first trip. He had to borrow kerosene from the settlers along the lake, leaving a series of darkened cabins behind him as he went up, as there was no longer oil to light candles. On his return trip, while Shorts was borrowing more kerosene from the Lequime brothers at Okanagan Mission, Mary Victoria Greenhow was damaged by fire. Shorts managed to get her to Okanagan Landing, where he attempted and failed to convert her to a wood-burner.

== Replacement ==
Shorts ordered a new boiler for Mary Victoria Greenhow, hoping to repair her, but he and carpenter John Hamilton began work on a new ship in the meantime. By the time the boiler arrived in July 1887, they had already built SS Jubilee. Shorts decided to put the boiler in his new steamship instead and transferred the engine from Mary Victoria Greenhow to Jubilee, which was launched in September. The engine later powered several other ships, including City of Vernon, Mud Hen, SS Wanderer, and Violet, but Mary Victoria Greenhow was the only one registered on official records, so they would all be considered the same ship, strictly speaking. The engine was eventually used at Trinity Valley for a shingle mill and wood-cutting starting in 1906 before Mr. and Mrs. G. H. Worth of Vernon, British Columbia, whose family had owned it for many years, donated it to the Vernon Museum and Archives in November, 1957.
