= MV Trepanier =

History

Canada
- Operator: Okanagan Lake Boat Company
- Port of registry: 134038
- Route: Summerland-Penticton-Naramata
- Launched: 1911
- Status: Registry closed in 1937

General characteristics
- Type: Ferry, Gas Launch
- Tonnage: 11 GT
- Length: 38.3 ft
- Beam: 8.6 ft
- Installed power: single-horse power engine
- Propulsion: Screw
- Crew: Cpt. Languedoc, Peter Roe

MV Trepanier was a passenger and cargo ferry that operated between the communities of Summerland, Penticton, and Naramata on Okanagan Lake in British Columbia, Canada.Trepanier was added to the Okanagan Lake Boat Company's fleet in 1912.

The company's owner, Peter Roe, operated the Trepanier and the earlier MV Skookum with his brothers, Fred and Gerald. Trepanier was then purchased by Captain J. A. Noyes and his brother, I. R. Noyes, who used the ferry for pleasure trips until November 1913, when the MV Skookum, built in 1912 and not to be confused with the Skookum mentioned earlier, collided with the Canadian Pacific Railway company-operated SS Castlegar and sank. Although Trepanier was smaller than Skookum, she was used as a replacement and began regular ferry service soon after the crash.

The name "Trepanier" comes from a local place name that originates from a successful "trepan" operation performed by French Fur Brigade trader on a Shushwap chief near Summerland.
