= SS Red Star =

Screw steamer active in British Columbia, Canada

History

Canada
- Name: Red Star (1887); Okanagan (1888); Lucy
- Owner: J. Nickols; R. P. Rithet; Dow and Gilles (1889–1891); Lequime Bros. (1891–1894); Couson and Campbell (1894); Campbell and Hultman (1894–); Captain Reid; Mr. Busk; Mr. Calson; George Hale
- Port of registry: Victoria
- Route: Spallumcheen River, Okanagan Lake
- Builder: W. B. Couson
- Launched: 1887
- In service: 1887
- Out of service: 1913
- Refit: 1888, 1894, 1895
- Identification: 90787

General characteristics
- Class & type: Screw steamer
- Tonnage: 14 gross, 10 net
- Length: 33 feet (10 m)
- Beam: 9 feet (2.7 m)
- Depth: 3 feet (0.91 m)

SS Red Star, later called Okanagan, Lucy, and Red Star again, was a screw steamer that operated on Spallumcheen River and later Okanagan Lake in British Columbia, Canada, serving various purposes under many owners, as well as undergoing renovations and modifications from her construction in 1887 to the closing of her registry in 1915.

== Spallumcheen River ==
Red Star was a screw steamer built in Victoria, British Columbia in 1887 for use on the Spallumcheen River. However, she had too much draught for the sandbar stream and sank in 1888. The same year, she was raised and her machinery was taken out, with her hull left lying on the river shore at Enderby, British Columbia.

== Okanagan Lake ==
In 1889, Alexander Dow and Allen Gilles of O'Keefe's Ranch in the Okanagan decided to use the SS Red Star on Okanagan Lake for freight, especially for shipping wheat. B. F. Young from Armstrong, British Columbia hauled the hull of the vessel to the head of Okanagan Lake. It was then taken to the shipyard at Okanagan Landing and lengthened by 20 feet (6.1 m) and refit as a screw steamer with a new boiler and engine, provided by Nicholles and Renouf of Victoria. The twenty feet were never updated in the register, which continued to show her length as 33 feet (10 m). Red Star, then known as Okanagan, became the first serious competitor to the boat service run by Captain Thomas Shorts on Okanagan Lake upon her arrival in 1888.

=== Lequime Brothers ===
In 1891, Dow and Gilles sold Red Star to the Lequime Brothers of Kelowna, British Columbia, who used her as a camp-tender and for towing logs. However, Dow and Gilles had neglected to keep up payments on the machinery, causing bailiff trouble for the Lequime's. The story goes that her engineer, Henry Coibeck, was told to take her machinery out as quickly as possible one day upon her arrival at Kelowna, which he completed in 12 hours. However, the sheriff arrived and located the machinery in a shed, seized it, and put in a bailiff to watch it. However, the Lequime's invited the bailiff to a hotel, where they treated him so well he forgot the matter. When he returned to the shed, someone had dug a hole in the sand of the floor and buried it.

The truth of the story is debatable, but either way, the building was eventually burned and the engine and boiler were damaged.

=== Captain Campbell ===
After the fire, Captain Angus Campbell and W. B. Couson, engineer on the Canadian Pacific Railway-owned sternwheeler SS Aberdeen, bought the damaged Red Star for CAD$100.00 in May 1894. The hull was anchored off the Kelowna Saw Mill and the machinery was lying among the remains of the building and they took the hull and machinery to Okanagan Landing for repairs. Two months after the purchase, Couson sold his interest to a Mr. Hultman, who ran Red Star on Okanagan Lake with Campbell until July 1895, when they took her to Revelstoke, British Columbia by two flat cars and from there to Robson, British Columbia by water and finally to Nelson, British Columbia by rail. There, a new boiler with a capacity of 125 pounds of pressure was put in and Campbell began a prosperous towing service with her.

== Owners ==
Red Star underwent many ownership changes over the years. Her owners were, in order, J. Nickols, R. P. Rithet, Dow and Gilles, Lequime Bros., Couson and Campbell, Campbell and Hultman, Captain Reid, Mr. Busk, Mr. Calson, and George Hale. Captain Reid was her registered owner when her register closed out in 1915. Her name changed from Red Star to Okanagan to Lucy and back to Red Star.

== Red Star No. 2 ==
Eventually, Red Star was put on the run between Sicamous, British Columbia and Enderby, British Columbia. However, she drew too much water, so R. P. Rithet had a flat-bottomed, scow-shaped stern-wheeler of light draft built, where he placed Red Star's machinery. The machinery was not suitable for a stern-wheeler, so the paddle wheel had to be driven with a chain and sprocket wheel. and to overcome the difficulty the paddle wheel was driven with a chain and sprocket wheel. This vessel became known as Red Star No. 2 and thus, the original Red Star's long and varied career ended.
