= MV Mallard =

Canadian ferry

History

Canada
- Name: Mallard (1910–1910); Kaleden (1910–)
- Owner: C. Noel Higgin (1910–1910); James Ritchie (1910–); South Okanagan Transportation Company; Mr. McCallum; Matt Wilson
- In service: 1908
- Fate: Sank

General characteristics
- Type: Ferry
- Length: 30 ft (9.1 m)
- Capacity: 12 passengers

MV Mallard, later Kaleden, was a ferry that linked the communities of Summerland and Naramata on Okanagan Lake in British Columbia, Canada from 1908 to 1910, and later served Skaha Lake and Kaleden, British Columbia, under the name Kaleden.

== Construction ==
In late 1907, the provincial government granted a subsidy for a regular ferry to link Summerland and Naramata in response to a request from pioneer John Moore Robinson; at the time, the newly established town of Naramata had no transportation aside from the occasional Canadian Pacific Railway ships and a personal boat owned by Robinson. The contract was awarded to C. Noel Higgin, who had Avis Boat Works build the 30-foot (9.1 m), gasoline cabin launch, Mallard. She could carry 12 passengers and light freight, while a scow carried heavy freight, livestock, and vehicles. Mallard became the run's first ferry starting in March 1908.

== Service ==
Mallard made two trips daily under the command of Captain Charles Hatfield from Nova Scotia. Her main competitor was Robinson's Maude-Moore, but the two boats were evenly matched in speed. In 1908, Higgin, Robinson, and Ned Bentley formed the Okanagan Lake Boat Company and Maude-Moore became the official ferry. Mallard and her scows were deemed to be too small for further service, so she was sold James Ritchie, the promoter of the newly established community of Kaleden, British Columbia, in 1910. Ritchie renamed her Kaleden after his town and used her on Skaha Lake to serve Kaleden, including towing scows of woodstave pipe and cement. Kaleden was the first boat that especially served the new town and she played an instrumental role in shaping its development.

== Later years ==
Kaleden was eventually sold to the newly formed South Okanagan Transportation Company, which replaced her with the new MV Cygnet after two years. Kaleden was sold to a Mr. McCallum in Summerland, who bought her for the engine. However, he found that it was too securely embedded in concrete to remove, so he sold her to Matt Wilson of Paradise Ranch. He used her until she sank off the Canadian National Railway wharf in Summerland, where she still lies.
