= Skookum (disambiguation) =

Skookum is a word derived from the Chinook Jargon common in regional English in the Pacific Northwest region of North America. It may also refer to a mythical monster or a doll (as discussed in main article).

Skookum may also refer to:

- Skookum WCT Cash Spiel, a curling tournament from 2006 to 2010
- MV Skookum (1906), a Canadian ferry
- MV Skookum (1912), a Canadian ferry
- Skookums, a dog in Ernest Thompson Seton's 1911 book Rolf in the Woods
- Skookum, a Mallet steam locomotive under restoration by Oregon Coast Scenic Railroad
- Skookum cast, alleged evidence of Bigfoot
- Skookum cat, an experimental breed of domestic cat

== See also ==
- Big Skookum or Hammersley Inlet, Washington state, United States
- Little Skookum Inlet, Washington state
