= Peachland fire =

2012 wildfire in British Columbia, Canada

Peachland fire 2012
- Date: September 9, 2012
- Location: Trepanier & East Peachland

Statistics
- Burned area: 200 ha (490 acres)
- Land use: Parkland, Rural

Impacts
- Structures lost: 7

Ignition
- Cause: Unknown

The Peachland fire was a large wildfire in 2012 in British Columbia.

The Peachland fire started at around 3:00 pm, September 9, 2012, near the Okanagan connector behind the community of Trepanier on the east side of Peachland.

Strong winds, high temperatures, low humidity and extremely dry conditions caused the Peachland fire to grow quickly. By around 7:00 pm, it had reached 200 hectares and burned a path towards Okanagan Lake. At least 1,550 residents were evacuated from the fire zone; four houses and three outbuildings were destroyed.

Seventy firefighters, 17 structural fire protection units and six helicopters fought the Peachland fire at its peak. Light rainfall and cooler temperatures helped bring the fire under control on September 10.
