= Rattlesnake (disambiguation) =

Rattlesnakes are a group of venomous snakes, genera Crotalus and Sistrurus.

Rattlesnake or Rattlesnakes may also refer to:

== Films ==
- The Rattlesnake (film), a 1913 silent film short
- Rattlesnakes (film), a 2019 film
- Rattlesnake (1995 film), an action film
- Rattlesnake (2019 film), a crime drama mystery film

== Music ==
- The Rattlesnakes (1950s band), a British band featuring the Bee Gees
- Frank Carter and the Rattlesnakes, an English hardcore punk band formed in 2015
- Rattlesnake, an album by A Static Lullaby
- Rattlesnakes (album), a 1984 album by Lloyd Cole and the Commotions
  - "Rattlesnakes" (song), a single from the above album by Lloyd Cole
- "Rattlesnake" (Live song), 1997
- "Rattlesnake" (King Gizzard & the Lizard Wizard song), 2017
- "Rattlesnake", a song by The Replacements from the 1981 album Sorry Ma, Forgot to Take Out the Trash
- "Rattlesnake", a song by St. Vincent from the 2014 album St. Vincent
- "Rattlesnake”, a 2025 song by Zach Bryan and Jack Van Cleaf

== Places ==
- Rattlesnake (Tampa), a neighborhood located in the South Tampa district of Tampa, Florida, United States
- Rattlesnake Creek (disambiguation)
- Rattlesnake Hills AVA, a wine region in Yakima County, Washington, United States
- Rattlesnake Island (disambiguation)
- Rattlesnake Knob, a summit in the U.S. state of Wisconsin

== Ships ==
- HMS Rattlesnake, several ships of the Royal Navy
- MV Rattlesnake, a Canadian ferry
- USS Rattlesnake (1813), a United States Navy brig
- CSS Nashville (1861), an American steamer

== Other ==
- The Rattlesnake (Remington), a 1905 equestrian sculpture by Frederic Remington
- Rattlesnake (roller coaster), a roller coaster ride which opened in 1998 at Chessington World of Adventures
- Rattlesnakes (novella), a 2024 novella by Stephen King
- Rattlesnake bean
- Rattlesnake Annie (born 1941), American country singer and songwriter
- Rattlesnake Jake, a character in the 2011 animated film Rango
- Texas Rattlesnake, a nickname given to former wrestler Stone Cold Steve Austin
- A type of noise sometimes made by a wastegate
- The Rattlesnake (also known as The Carolinian), a 1922 play by Raphael Sabatini and J. E. Harold Terry
