= SS Maude-Moore =

History

Canada
- Owner: William Jessup Snodgrass
- Acquired: 1899
- Fate: Burned

General characteristics
- Type: Screw steamer
- Length: 45 ft (14 m)
- Capacity: 20 passengers

SS Maude-Moore was a wood-burning screw steamer that provided a ferry service between the communities of Summerland, Naramata, and Penticton on Okanagan Lake in British Columbia, Canada.

== Construction ==
In 1899, William Jessup Snodgrass, pioneer and promoter of the community of Okanagan Falls, purchased Maude-Moore and had her hull shipped from Peterborough, Ontario to the Okanagan Landing shipyard at the north end of Okanagan Lake. She was named after Snodgrass' youngest daughter. Captain Joseph Weeks, who later became the last captain of the well-known SS Sicamous, helped build Maude-Moore's top structure and her engine and boiler were shipped to Okanagan Landing from and earlier boat, Jessie. Maude-Moore was 45 feet long, could carry 20 passengers, and had a scow for heavy freight. Her hull was strong, but her pilothouse and cabin were square and clumsy with sliding windows and her build was better suited for river service than for open water.

== Service ==
Snodgrass used Maude-Moore on Skaha Lake until 1905, when he sold her to the pioneer John Moore Robinson. From then on, she provided ferry service on Okanagan Lake as Robinson's private boat, along with his MV Rattlesnake, until Maude-Moore became an official ferry in 1908 after Robinson formed the Okanagan Lake Boat Company. MV Mallard, a competing ferry, was then taken to Skaha Lake. For the next five years, Maude-Moore ran twice daily and made chartered trips to Kelowna and Penticton.She endured many rough winter storms, but no serious trouble occurred. Aside from regular ferry service, she also took commercial travelers to Penticton and transported baseball and cricket teams and dance parties. Once, she transported two tons of dynamite from Okanagan Landing for road construction, and on another occasion, she carried out an armed patrol for two convicts who had escaped from the Canadian Pacific Railway company's SS Okanagan.

== Retirement ==
In 1911, the Okanagan Lake Boat Company was sold to Peter Roe, who replaced Maude-Moore and Rattlesnake with two gas boats. Maude-Moore was beached and burned at Naramata.
