= Colleen (rowboat) =

Colleen was a rowboat used on Okanagan Lake in British Columbia, Canada, in the late 1800s and early 1900s. She belonged to the Reverend Thomas Greene and served many early settlers and pioneers of the Okanagan, including W. D. Walker and Thomas Ellis, the earliest European settler in Penticton, British Columbia.

== See also ==
- Lily of the Valley
- Ruth Shorts
