= MV Rattlesnake =

History

Canada
- Name: Orillia; Rattlesnake
- Owner: J. M. Robinson
- Operator: Okanagan Lake Boat Company
- Port of registry: New Westminster 111610
- Route: Summerland-Naramata
- Launched: 1907
- In service: 1907

General characteristics
- Type: Ferry
- Tonnage: 12.4 gross, 8.56 registered
- Length: 36 ft (11 m)
- Beam: 8 ft 2 in (2.49 m)

MV Rattlesnake was a ferry launched in 1907 to operate between the communities of Summerland and Naramata on Okanagan Lake in British Columbia, Canada. Rattlesnake was originally called Orillia before she was bought and renamed by pioneer John Moore Robinson, owner of the Okanagan Lake Boat Company. She was launched in 1907 and became the company's second boat after the tug Maude-Moore, though she was the third Summerland-Naramata ferry after Maude-Moore and the smaller Mallard. Rattlesnake was first used as Robinson's private launch before she began ferry service. She was a short, squat, and slow tug that rode low in the water, but she was also powerful: she tugged cement pipe from factories, as well as hay and logs. In 1911, the Okanagan Lake Boat Company was sold to Peter Roe, who replaced Maude-Moore and Rattlesnake with two gas boats.
