= SS Kelowna =

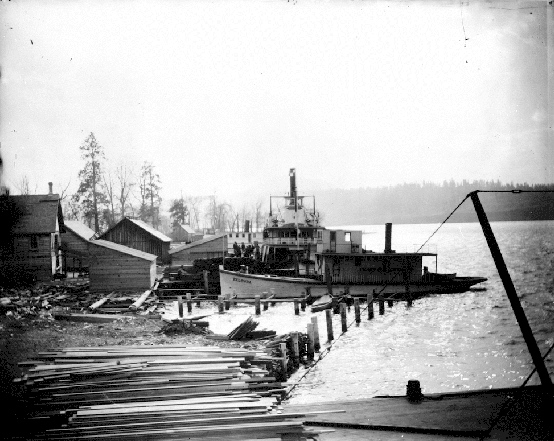
- SS Kelowna in 1906

History

Canada
- Namesake: Kelowna, British Columbia
- Owner: Canadian Pacific Railway
- Port of registry: New Westminster, BC, number 111,790
- Builder: Keswick & Son
- Launched: 1892
- In service: 1892–1912
- Fate: dismantled in Penticton, BC

General characteristics
- Class & type: Steam tug
- Tonnage: 65.38 gross, 4.46 net
- Length: 78 feet (24 m)
- Beam: 18 feet (5.5 m)
- Depth: 5.5 feet (1.7 m)

SS Kelowna was a tow boat that was operational between the years 1892–1912 on Okanagan Lake in British Columbia. It was later dismantled in Penticton.

== Kelowna Saw Mill Company ==
In 1892, a new boat named Kelowna was built by Keswick & Son for the Kelowna Saw Mill Company. When the Kelowna Saw Mill Company had been formed, it had taken over the saw mill business in Kelowna that was formerly carried on by Lequime Bros. Previous to the construction of the S.S. Kelowna, the Kelowna Saw Mill Company had used the S.S. Okanagan as a tow boat on Okanagan Lake until the boat was dismantled in 1902. The machinery taken from Penticton was placed on S.S. Kelowna.

== Role ==
Kelowna was a coal-fired steam tug that operated along Okanagan Lake. She was used to haul log booms to David Lloyd-Jones’ recently built mill as well as deliver lumber along various points in the lake. In her later years, some of Kelowna’s parts were used in mines.

== Later years ==
The Kelowna Saw Mill Company used Kelowna until 1911. She was then sold to a man in Vernon named S.C. Smith, who at the time was operating a saw mill near Naramata. Afterwards, Kelowna was taken to Penticton and dismantled there. The boiler from Kelowna was used for a while on the Okanagan Mine near Penticton, BC.
