= Grant Island (Okanagan Lake) =

Island in Okanagan Lake, British Columbia, Canada

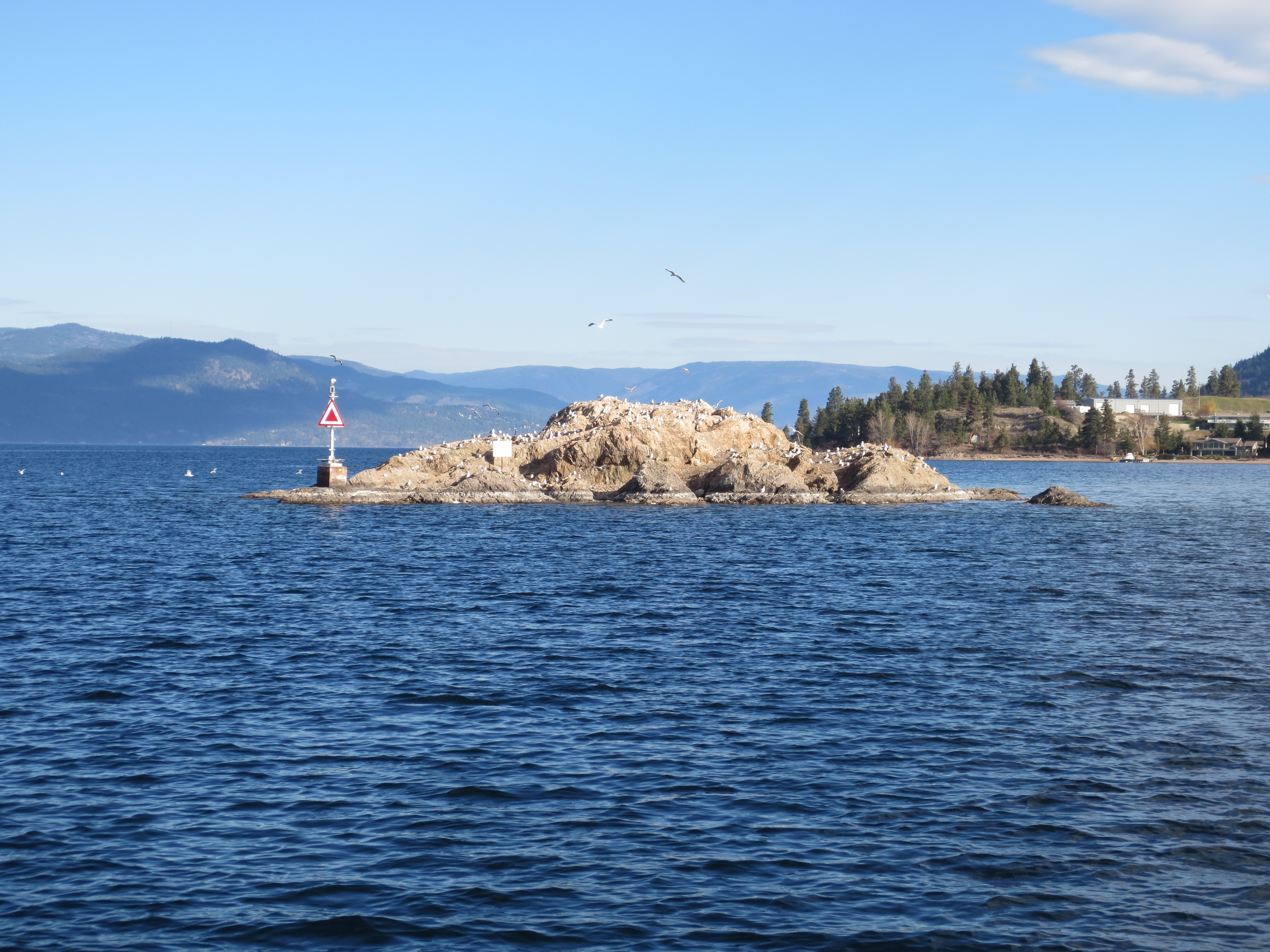
- South side of Grant Island in Late Winter Morning
- Interactive map of Grant Island
- Location: Central Okanagan, Canada
- Coordinates: 50°06′22″N 119°28′07″W

Grant Island is a bird sanctuary in Okanagan Lake, British Columbia, Canada. Grant Island is located in the northern half of Okanagan Lake, about one kilometre from the shores of the municipality of Lake Country (Winfield-Oyama). Grant Island is one of only two islands in Okanagan Lake, the other being Rattlesnake Island.

== Gallery ==
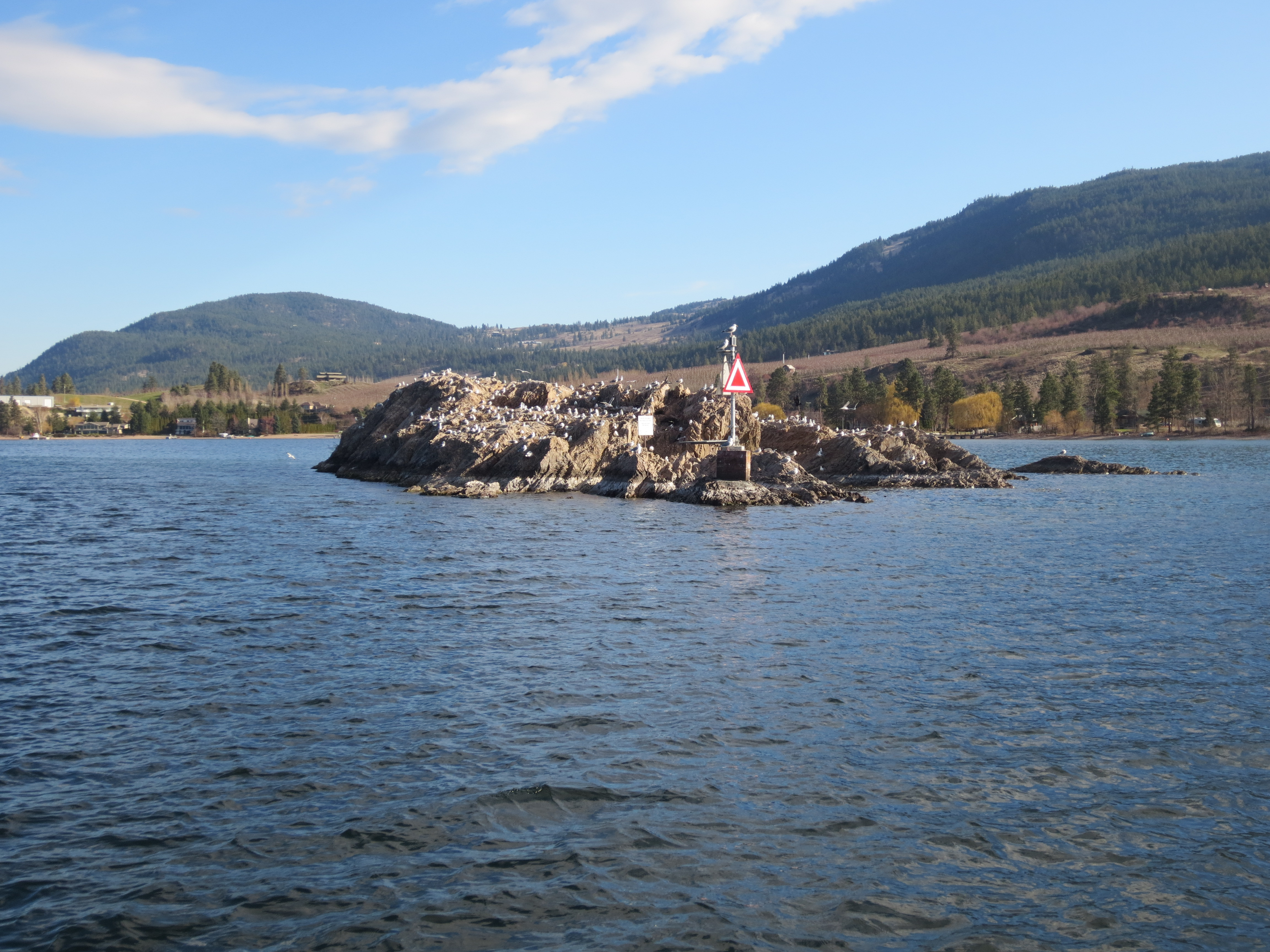
Western side of Grant Island on a Late Winter Morning
