= SS Wanderer =

Ferry

History

Canada
- Name: Wanderer; Violet
- Owner: N. H. Caesar (–1901; William A. D'Aethe (1901–); William Smith
- Builder: N. H. Caesar
- Sponsored by: Mrs. C. E. Woods

General characteristics
- Type: Ferry
- Length: 40 ft (12 m)
- Beam: 9.5 ft (2.9 m)
- Installed power: 5 hp (3.7 kW)

SS Wanderer was the second, unofficial ferry to serve Okanagan Lake in British Columbia, Canada.

She was built by N. H. Caesar, who had bought Thomas Shorts' barge City of Vernon, only to discover that she leaked badly. He renamed City of Vernon as Mud Hen and built Wanderer using Mud Hen's five horsepower engine. Wanderer was 40 feet (12 m) by 9.5 feet (2.9 m) and her deck house originally belonged to the ship MV Penticton, which was converted into a towboat by the Lequime brothers and could thus spare the surplus material.

Wanderer was christened with the traditional bottle of champagne, but the owners had already drunk it before Mrs. C. E. Woods broke it over her bow and named her. Caesar used her to tow logs to Kelowna and to haul dynamite to Penticton and the Morning Glory mine and wheat from Caesar's farm to Okanagan Landing. In 1901, Caesar sold her to William A. D'Aethe, who in turn sold her to William Smith, who took her to Kalamalka Lake. There, he renamed her Violet and used her to tow logs for the Smith Lumber Company to be sawed into firewood and hauled to Vernon, British Columbia.

Eventually, her engine was removed and installed in a sawmill while her hull rotted on a beach. The engine had come from Mud Hen, or City of Vernon, which had in turn gotten it from SS Jubilee, which had in fact gotten it from SS Mary Victoria Greenhow, the first steamboat on Okanagan Lake, operated by Thomas Shorts. The end of Violet, or Wanderer, therefore signaled the end of the entire line of ships, that had all been registered under Mary Victoria Greenhow in the official records. The engine was donated by Mr. and Mrs. G. H. Worth of Vernon, whose family had owned it for many years, to the Vernon Museum and Archives in November, 1957.
