= MV Skookum (1912) =

History

Canada
- Operator: Okanagan Lake Boat Company
- Port of registry: 134028
- Route: Summerland-Naramata
- Builder: Summerland Boat Works Ltd
- Launched: 1913
- Fate: Struck in collision with S.S. Castlegar
- Status: Registry closed

General characteristics
- Type: Ferry, Motor Launch
- Tonnage: 20.71 GT, 16.41 RT
- Displacement: 10.89
- Length: 50.3 ft
- Beam: 10.3 ft
- Draft: 3.8 ft
- Propulsion: Screw
- Capacity: 60 passengers
- Crew: Cpt. Languedoc, Peter Roe

MV Skookum, known locally as the Skookum II, was a passenger ferry that operated on Okanagan Lake, connecting the southern communities of Naramata and Summerland in British Columbia, Canada. The boat was built by the Summerland Boat Works for the Okanagan Lake Boat Company, under the ownership of Peter Roe, and was the company's second ferry called "Skookum."

The Okanagan Lake Boat Company was first incorporated by pioneer John Moore Robinson in 1909 before going under the management of Peter Roe in 1912. It was later purchased by the Naramata Syndicate, which began a new line of larger and more modern boats. Skookum was the first of these; she was a 50 feet (15 m)-long motor launch that could carry 60 passengers. The Naramata Syndicate also built scows for freight and cargo to assist Skookum and the other ferries.

In November, 1913, Skookum collided with the Canadian Pacific Railway company's SS Castlegar between the communities Trout Creek and Penticton. Skookum sank and was replaced by MV Trepanier, a similar, but smaller boat that had hitherto been used for pleasure trips.
