= SS Jubilee =

History

Canada
- Owner: Thomas Shorts
- Builder: Thomas Shorts; John Hamilton
- Launched: 22 September 1887
- Fate: Sank Winter 1889–1890

General characteristics
- Length: 30 ft (9.1 m)
- Beam: 8 ft (2.4 m)

SS Jubilee was the second steamship on Okanagan Lake in British Columbia, Canada, owned and operated by Captain Thomas Shorts. She was built by Shorts and carpenter John Hamilton in 1887 while they were waiting for a new boiler to come in for their first steamship, SS Mary Victoria Greenhow, which needed new machinery. When it arrived, they decided to put the new boiler in the new 30 feet (9.1 m) by 8 feet (2.4 m) Jubilee instead and they put Mary Victoria Greenhow's engine in Jubilee as well. She was launched at the Okanagan Landing shipyard at 3:30 p.m. on September 22, 1887. Jubilee took about two weeks per round trip on the lake. A gold strike on Granite Creek in the Similkameen River in 1889 created business for Jubilee and Shorts built a barge to help her. However, the strike didn't last long and the barge was then beached. Jubilee was also short-lived, as she froze in ice at Okanagan Landing during a cold spell in the winter of 1889–1890. She sank and in the spring, her machinery was put in Shorts' new barge, City of Vernon. The engine was reinstalled in several more ships, and the retired engine was used in a shingle mill for cutting firewood at Trinity Valley starting in 1906. Finally, Mr. and Mrs. G. H. Worth of Vernon, British Columbia, who had owned and used it for many years, donated it to the Vernon Museum and Archives in November 1957.

== See also ==
- SS Wanderer
