= The Rattlesnakes =

The Rattlesnakes may refer to:

- The Rattlesnakes (1950s band), a British band that evolved into the Bee Gees
- Frank Carter & The Rattlesnakes, a British punk band formed in 2015

== See also ==
- Rattlesnake (disambiguation)
