= Rattlesnake Creek =

Rattlesnake Creek may refer to:

- Rattlesnake Creek (Bronx)
- Rattlesnake Creek (Kansas)
- Rattlesnake Creek (Ohio)
- Rattlesnake Creek (Big Walnut Creek), a stream in Ohio
- Rattlesnake Creek (Oregon)
- Rattlesnake Creek (Spring Brook)
