= Whiteman Creek =

Creek in the Okanagan Region of British Columbia, Canada

Coordinates: 50°14′04″N 119°26′19″W

Whiteman Creek is a creek located in the Okanagan Region of British Columbia. The creek flows into Okanagan Lake from the west. The only settlement on the creek is on its delta, the gated community of Parker Cove.

== History ==
The creek was discovered in the 1870s, and was mined in the 20th century.

== See also ==
- List of rivers of British Columbia
