= Okanagan Centre Submarine =

1980s plywood submarine

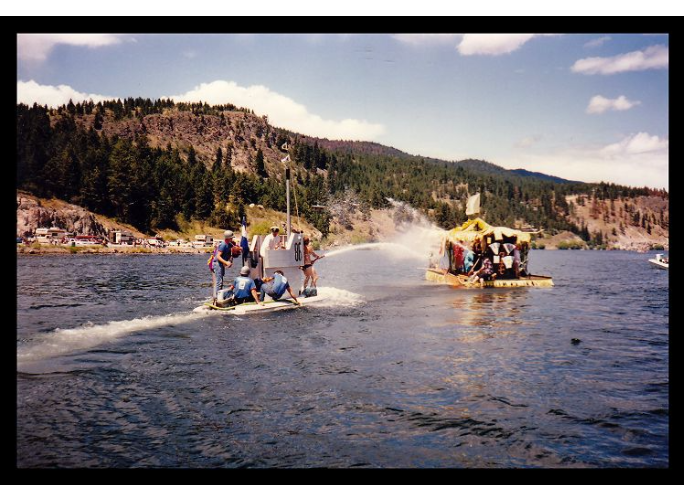

The Okanagan Centre Submarine or Henry D. Reddecopp, was a local submarine on Okanagan Lake in 1986. The vessel was operated by the Okanagan Centre and ran for only a couple years.

The Okanagan Submarine was constructed by Tobias Reddecopp out of styrofoam and plywood. The submarine was environmentally friendly with propulsion by a Johnson outboard and later by a Mercury Marine engine. Upon completion, the craft was assigned to patrol Lake Country Days for illegal activity. Her original crew consisted of Commodore Robert Mercer (mayor of Oyama) and Admiral James McLellan with first mate Rene Cote.

Equipped to fight fires, in 1987, it provided escort for several boats transporting Brian Mulroney and other Commonwealth leaders to the Commonwealth Heads of Government Meeting (Commonwealth Conference). She has since been decommissioned.
