= Elem Indian Colony =

Federally recognized tribal nation in California, U.S.

The Elem Indian Colony of Pomo Indians of the Sulphur Bank Rancheria (Southeastern Pomo: 7lem) are a federally recognized Native American tribe of Pomo people in California.

== Reservation ==
The Elem Indian Colony has an Indian Reservation based on 50 acres (200,000 m^{2}) near Clearlake Oaks, California on the Eastern shore of Clear Lake. The Elem Indian Colony reservation was originally formed under the name Sulfur Bank Rancheria (39°00′31″N 122°40′13″W) in 1949. The reservation, known as 7lemtsawq'lo in Southeastern Pomo, lies between Clearlake Oaks to its north, and Clearlake to its south.

Currently they are attempting to regain ownership of Rattlesnake Island near their reservation, where they had held ceremonies for centuries.

== Government ==
Their tribal headquarters is in Lower Lake, California. The tribe was organized in 1936.

Their Indian Child Welfare Act Designated Agent is Augustin Garcia.

== Education ==
The colony is served by the Konocti Unified School District.

== Environment ==
The Sulphur Bank Mercury Mine is a superfund site on the Elem Pomo's reservation.
