= Mission Creek (British Columbia) =

River in Canada

Mission Creek Rivière de l'Anse-au-Sable
- Mouth of Mission Creek
- Native name: N'wha-kwi-sen

Location
- Country: Canada
- State: British Columbia
- District: Central Okanagan
- City: Kelowna

Physical characteristics
- Source
  - location: British Columbia, Canada
- Mouth
  - location: British Columbia, Canada
  - coordinates: 49°50′33″N 119°29′37″W
- Length: 75 km (47 mi)
- Basin size: 860 km^{2} (330 sq mi)
- Discharge
  - location: Lake Okanagan
  - average: 6.81 m^{3}/s (240 cu ft/s)

Mission Creek is a large creek in the Okanagan Region of British Columbia. Originally called N'wha-kwi-sen (smoothing stones), it was later mapped as Rivière de l’Anse-au-Sable (Sandy Bay River), the name Mission Creek was adopted in 1860 in honour of the Catholic Oblate Mission established by Father Pandosy and other settlers. The Creek rises in the Greystoke Mountain Range and runs west about 43 kilometres (27 mi) before emptying into Okanagan Lake south of Kelowna. Its watershed covers about 200,000 square kilometres (49,000,000 acres). Mission Creek was designated a BC Heritage River by the province in 1996.

== Kokanee ==
Mission Creek is the main spawning channel of Kokanee. The landlocked salmon likely made their way into the Okanagan when a remnant of Glacial Lake Penticton was connected by streams to the Pacific Ocean.

== Mission Creek Greenway ==
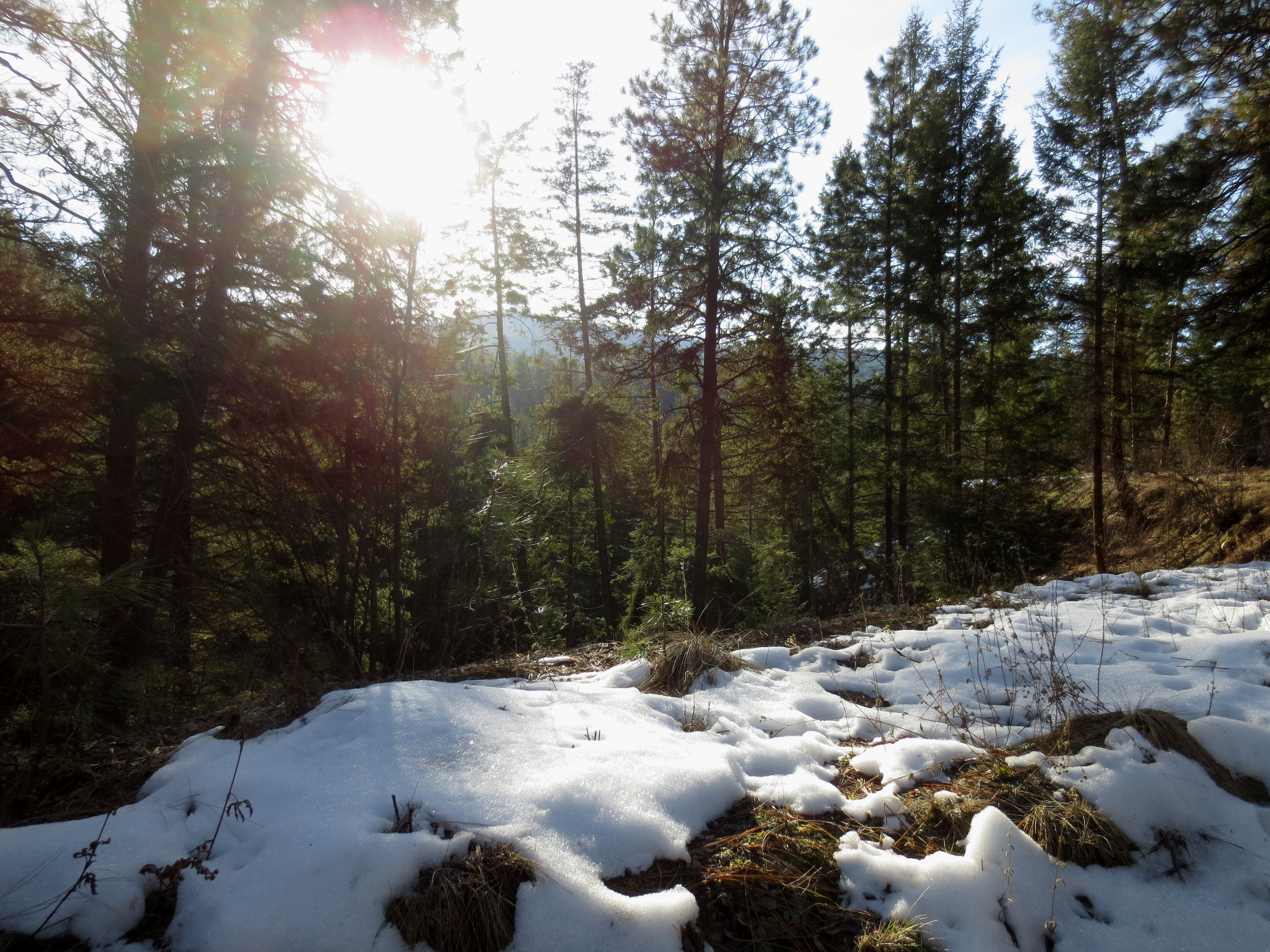
Mission Creek Greenway (15km Marker) 2016

The Mission Creek Greenway is a linear park extending along the creek from the shores of Okanagan Lake to Mission Creek Falls. Geological features along the trail are numerous and diverse, including; Layer Cake Hill, the Pinnacle, the White Lake Formation, hoodoos, exposures of ancient river systems and gigantic boulders dropped by the Fraser Glacier.

== Channelization ==
Mission Creek has been heavily modified through narrowing of the channel by the building of dikes for flood control from East Kelowna Bridge to the river mouth at Okanagan Lake. The Mission Creek channel has lost natural alluvial geomorphic processes (riffles, stream pools, and meanders), connection to the floodplain and wetlands, fish spawning and incubation habitats, diverse fish rearing habitats, diverse overwintering habitats, and fish refuge from high velocity water.

In 1938, much of the Mission Creek channel was significantly wider than it is currently, up to a maximum of 120 metres (390 ft). The channel narrowed to 50 metres (160 ft) from when dyking was completed in 1951 until sometime between 1973 and 1986 when the channel narrowed to 35 metres (115 ft). By 2006, channel width had decreased to 30 metres (98 ft).

== Mining ==
The creek was first mined in the 1870s. Later people such as Dan Gallagher mined the creek until the 1940s. British Columbia historian Bill Barlee believes the lost McLean Mine is located between the headwaters of Mission Creek and Monashee Creek. McLean was a First Nations prospector who lived near Kelowna. Placer mining occurred in Mission Creek around the early 20th century.

== Bridges ==
Several bridges span the Mission Creek. Here is a list starting from Lake Okanagan:

- Lakeshore Road - this bridge was rebuilt in the summer of 2014.
- Gordon Drive - this bridge was rebuilt in the summer of 2010
- Casorso Road - this bridge was rebuilt in the summer of 2007
- KLO Road
- East Kelowna Road
- Bridges above Gallagher's Canyon are not listed (Forestry Roads and Highways)

== See also ==
- List of rivers of British Columbia
