= Rattlesnake Island (Clear Lake) =

Coordinates: 39.01231°N 122.67926°W

For other places with the same name, see Rattlesnake Island (disambiguation).

Rattlesnake Island is an island located on Clear Lake in Lake County, northern California. Its land area is nominally 53 acres (210,000 square meters), but may vary significantly as lake levels rise and fall. It is 500 feet (150 meters) offshore from the north shore of the eastern arm of Clear Lake, the site of the Elem Indian Colony.

There is evidence of Native American activity on the island, possibly dating back as much as 8,000 years, although little archaeological work has been conducted. This site is connected with the prehistoric Post Pattern, and has probably been used by the Southeastern Pomo throughout prehistoric times. The Elem Pomo Colony have claimed the island to be their place of origin, and a political and religious center.

A history of ownership disputes dates as far back as the late nineteenth century. Due to a controversial 1949 U.S. court decision, the Elem Pomo tribe lost legal control of 80,000 acres (32,375 hectares) of its ancestral land, including the island. At present, legal title to the island is held by a Bay Area businessman, John Nady (founder of Nady Systems, Inc.) His 2003 attempt to obtain permits to construct a log cabin on the island was challenged by Elem Indian Colony members but eventually granted. John Parker, a local archaeologist, petitioned the federal government to add the island to the National Register of Historical Places. John Nady was developing a sustainable vacation home there with solar power and resident livestock. John Nady died in September 2024.
