= MV Cygnet =

Motor launch service

History

Canada
- Owner: South Okanagan Transportation Company
- Builder: Summerland Boat Works
- Completed: 1911
- Fate: Sold c. 1920

General characteristics
- Length: 40 ft (12 m)
- Beam: 10 ft (3.0 m)
- Installed power: Fairbanks marine engine

MV Cygnet was a motor launch that measured 40 feet (12 m) by 10 feet (3.0 m) and provided freight and ferry services on Skaha Lake in British Columbia, Canada. It was built by Summerland Boat Works in 1911 for the South Okanagan Transportation Company, owned by James Fraser Campbell and A. S. Hatfield, to replace the tug Kaleden. Cygnet used a steel bar that inserted into wheel sockets to rotate the flywheel for the purpose to start a Fairbanks marine engine. Early during the 1920s, it was moved to Okanagan Lake to transport fruit to Kelowna, British Columbia before getting sold in Kelowna during the summer.
