= Ruth Shorts =

Ruth Shorts was pioneer Captain Thomas Shorts' first boat on Okanagan Lake in British Columbia, Canada and starting with her, Shorts was the first boater on the lake, beginning a long history of ships and steam transportation that enabled the development of the Okanagan. In the early 1880s, Shorts thought of beginning a freight business on the lake and had Pringle and Hamill of Lansdowne build a rowboat with a capacity of 2.5 tons. The boat was 22 feet (6.7 m) long and had a small sail. Shorts named the boat Ruth Shorts after his mother and he began service in 1883. There was no set schedule, but the round trip generally took nine days and Shorts rowed in all weather for three years, averaging a passenger a month. He made about CAD$6000 rowing before venturing into steam with Mary Victoria Greenhow in 1886, only to lose his earnings.

== See also ==
- Colleen
- Lily of the Valley
