= Rattlesnake Island =

Rattlesnake Island may refer to:

- Rattlesnake Island (Clear Lake), in Lake County, California
- A previous name for Terminal Island, in Los Angeles County, California
- Rattlesnake Island (Lake Erie), in Ohio
- Rattlesnake Island (New Hampshire), in Lake Winnipesaukee
- Rattlesnake Island (Okanagan Lake), in British Columbia
- Rattlesnake Island (Queensland), in Halifax Bay, used for bombing practice
