= Rattlesnake Island (Okanagan Lake) =

Island in British Columbia, Canada

- Southern view of Rattlesnake Island in Winter
- Interactive map of Rattlesnake Island
- Location: Central Okanagan, Canada
- Coordinates: 49°44′52″N 119°43′02″W

Rattlesnake Island locator map for GEOG 272 assignment made with QGIS.

For other places with the same name, see Rattlesnake Island (disambiguation).

Rattlesnake Island is a small island on Okanagan Lake located directly east of Peachland, British Columbia, Canada. The land and shore surrounding the island form part of Okanagan Mountain Park. Legend has it that the lake monster, Ogopogo, lives in a cave on Rattlesnake Island earning the small land mass the nickname "Monster Island".

In the early 1970s, Eddy Haymour developed the island as a tourist attraction which included a mini-golf course with a replica of the Great Pyramid of Giza and a giant camel. The provincial government blocked the project shortly after it had opened. In 1976, after being released from a psychiatric ward, Haymour went to Lebanon, and together with five of his cousins held 20 Canadians hostage with AK-47s at the embassy in Beirut.

In 1986, the Supreme Court of British Columbia ordered the Government of British Columbia to pay Eddy Haymour $250,000 in damages for its "highly improper" actions. A documentary about this affair, Eddy's Kingdom, was released in 2020.

On August 16, 2003, a lightning struck near the island, sparking the 2003 Okanagan Mountain Park Fire that burned a large portion of the surrounding park.

== Gallery ==
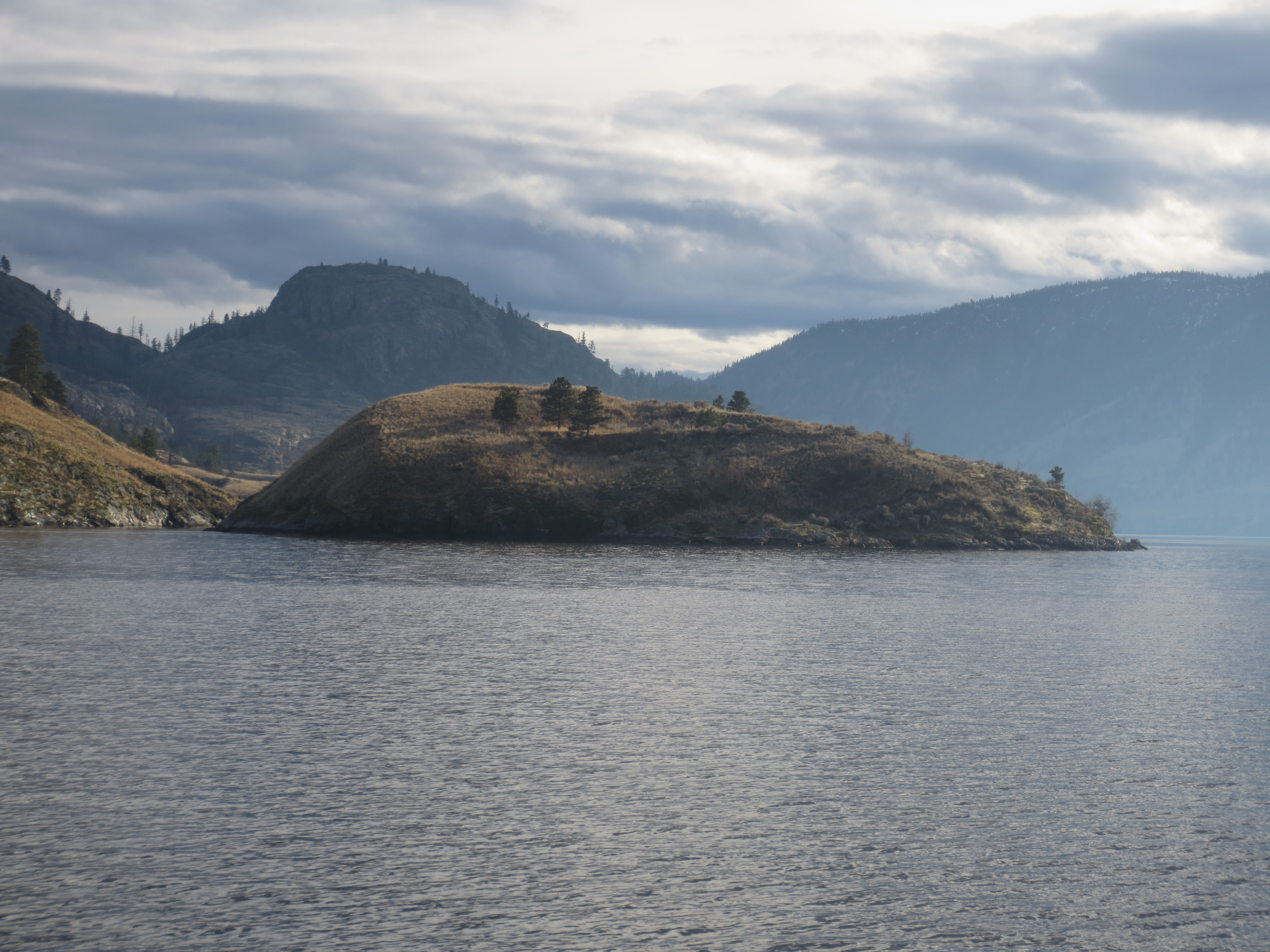
Rattlesnake Island from the Northwest

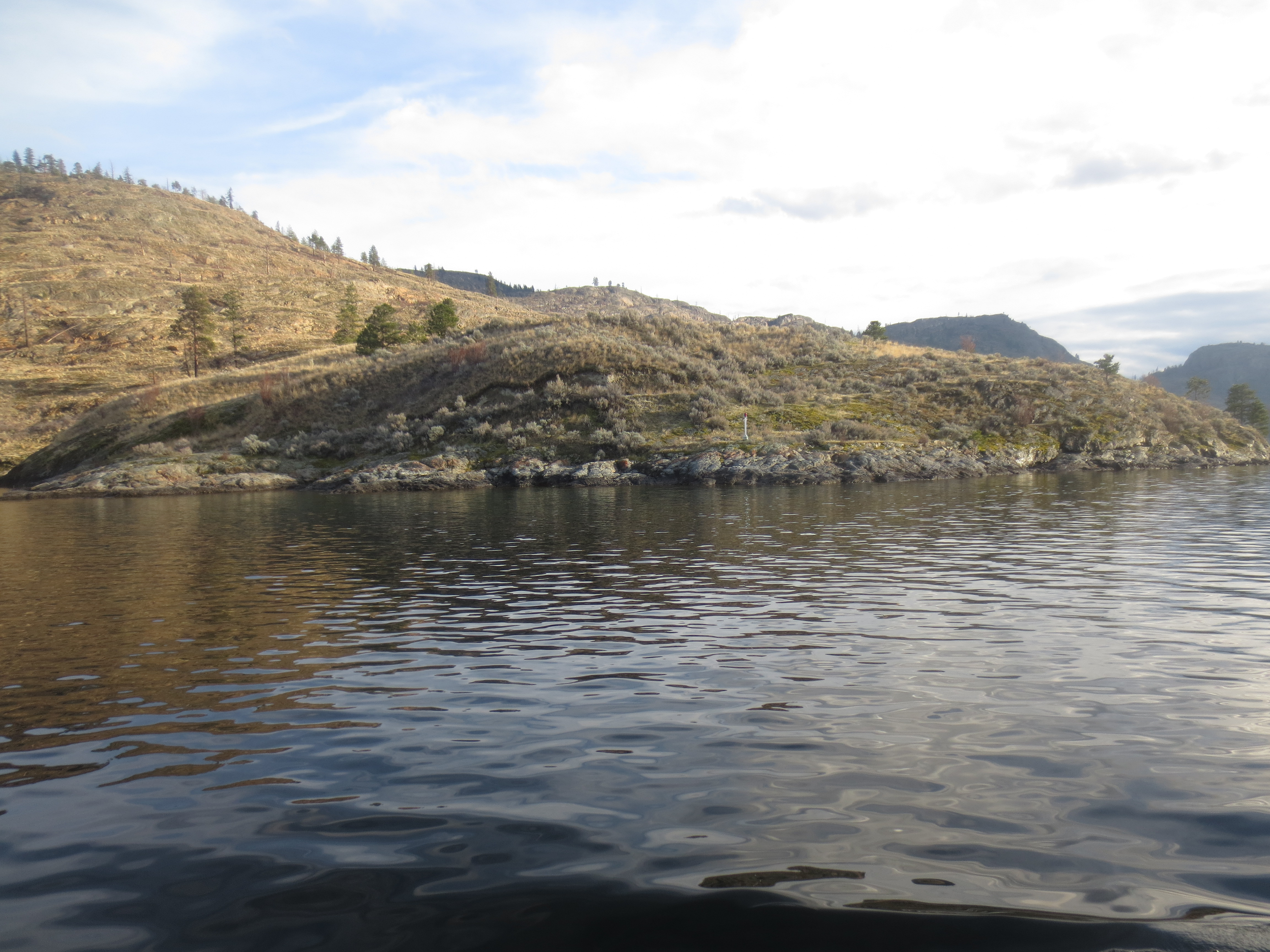
Western Side of Rattlesnake Island, note navigation marker

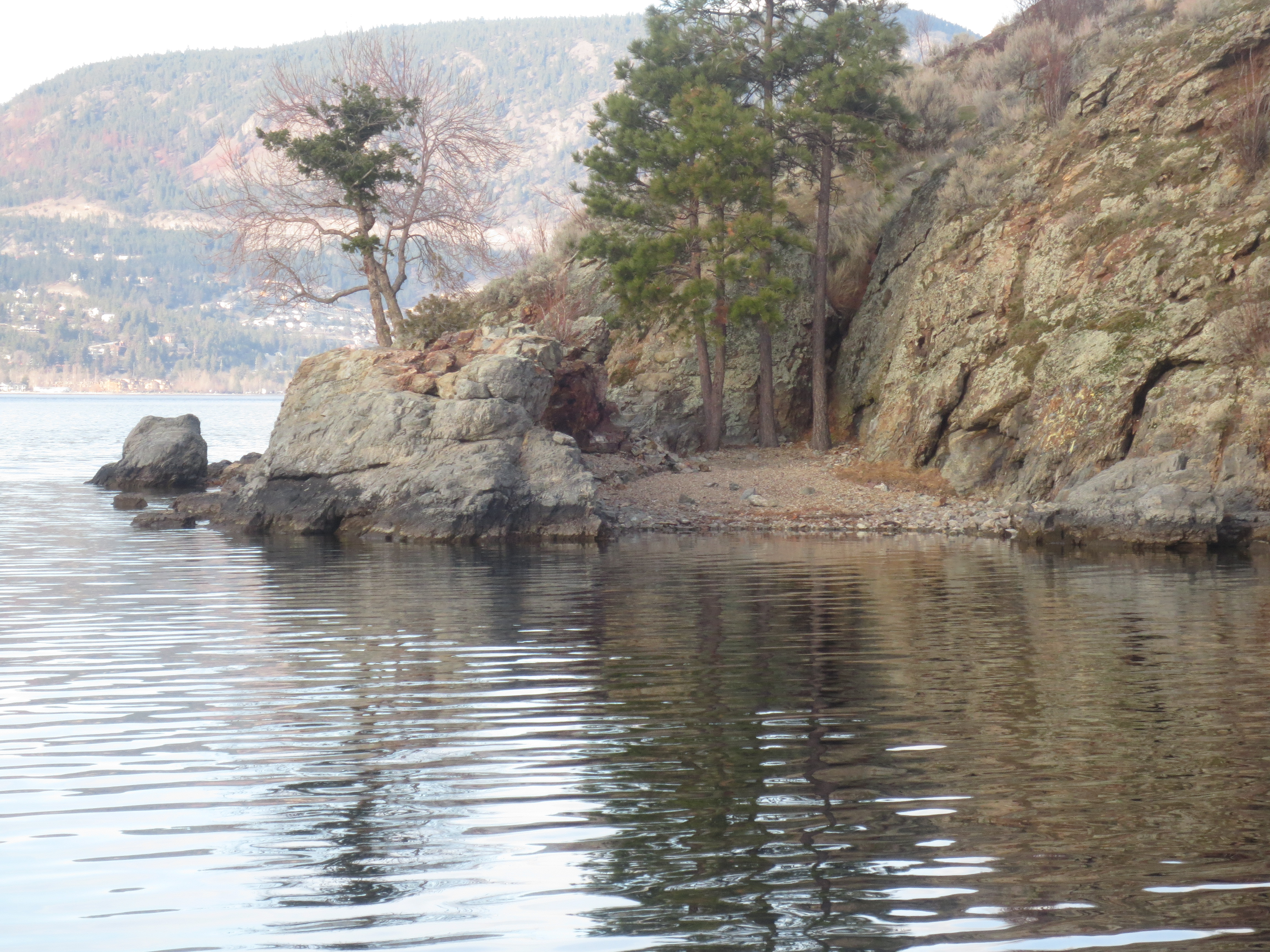
Small Beach on Southern Side of Rattlesnake Island

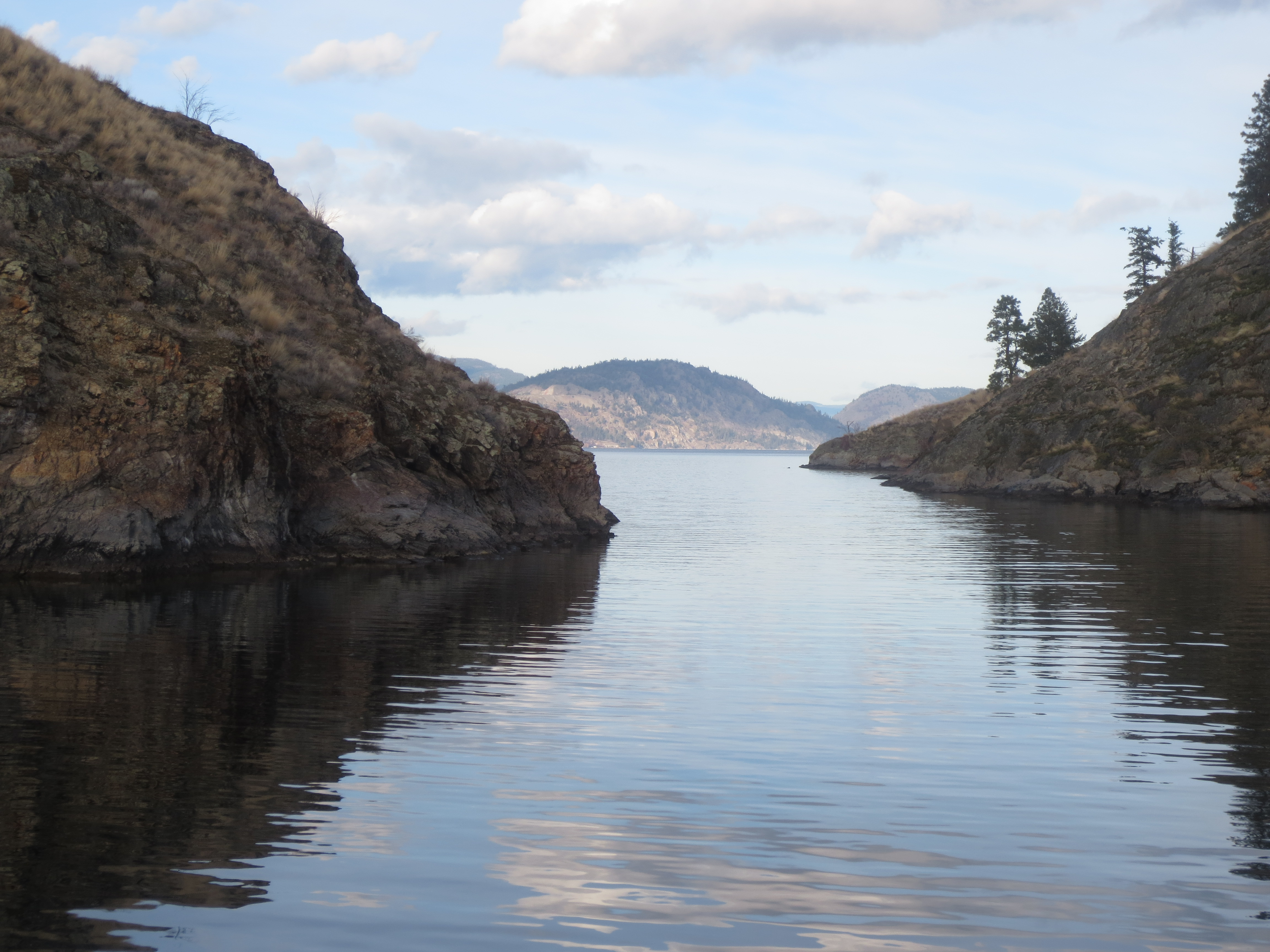
Eastern Entrance to Ogopogo Gap, Rattlesnake Island is on the left

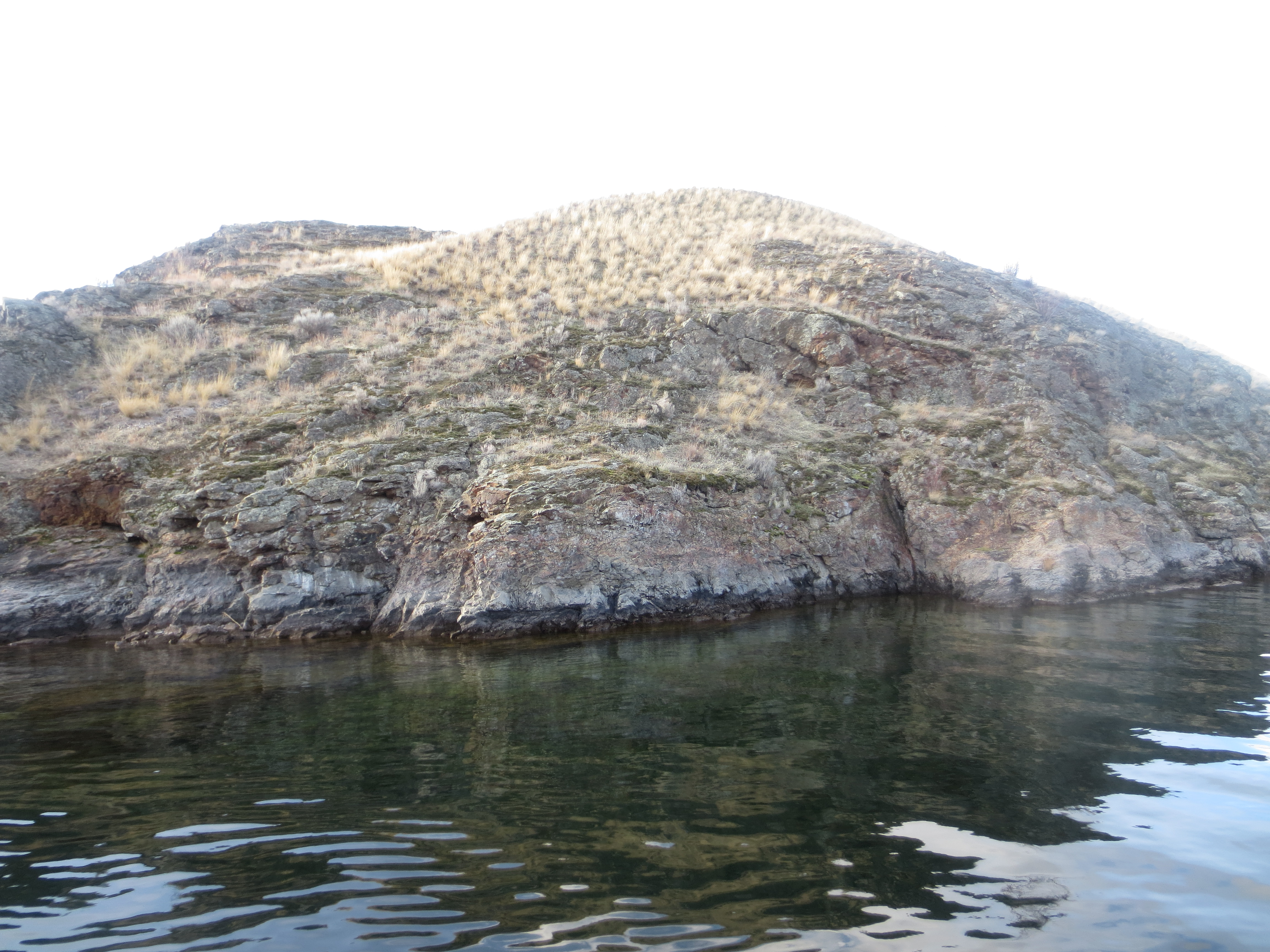
Rattlesnake Island as seen from Ogopogo Gap

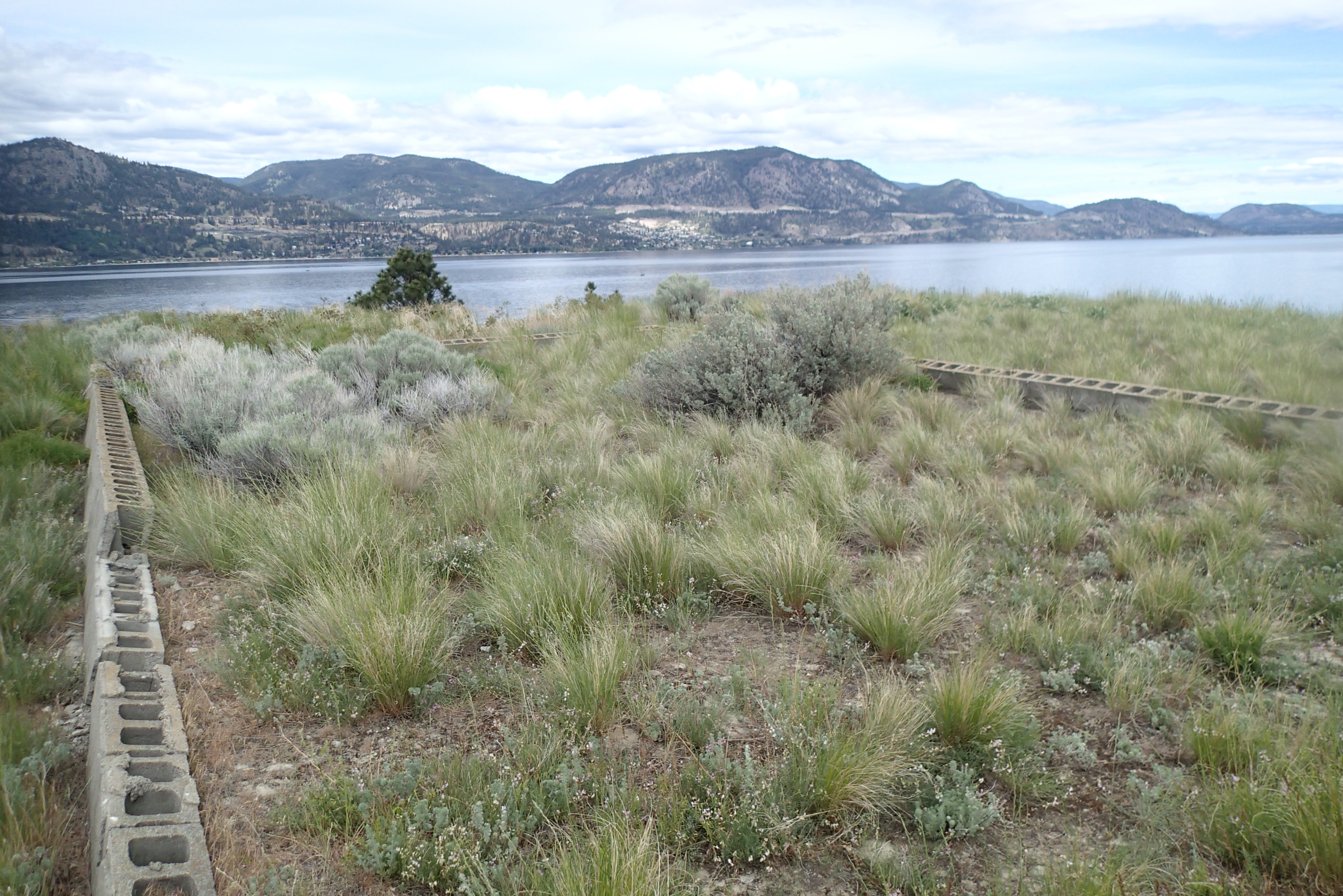
Remaining Base of Eddy Haymour's pyramid replica, made from cinder blocks at the highest point on the island.

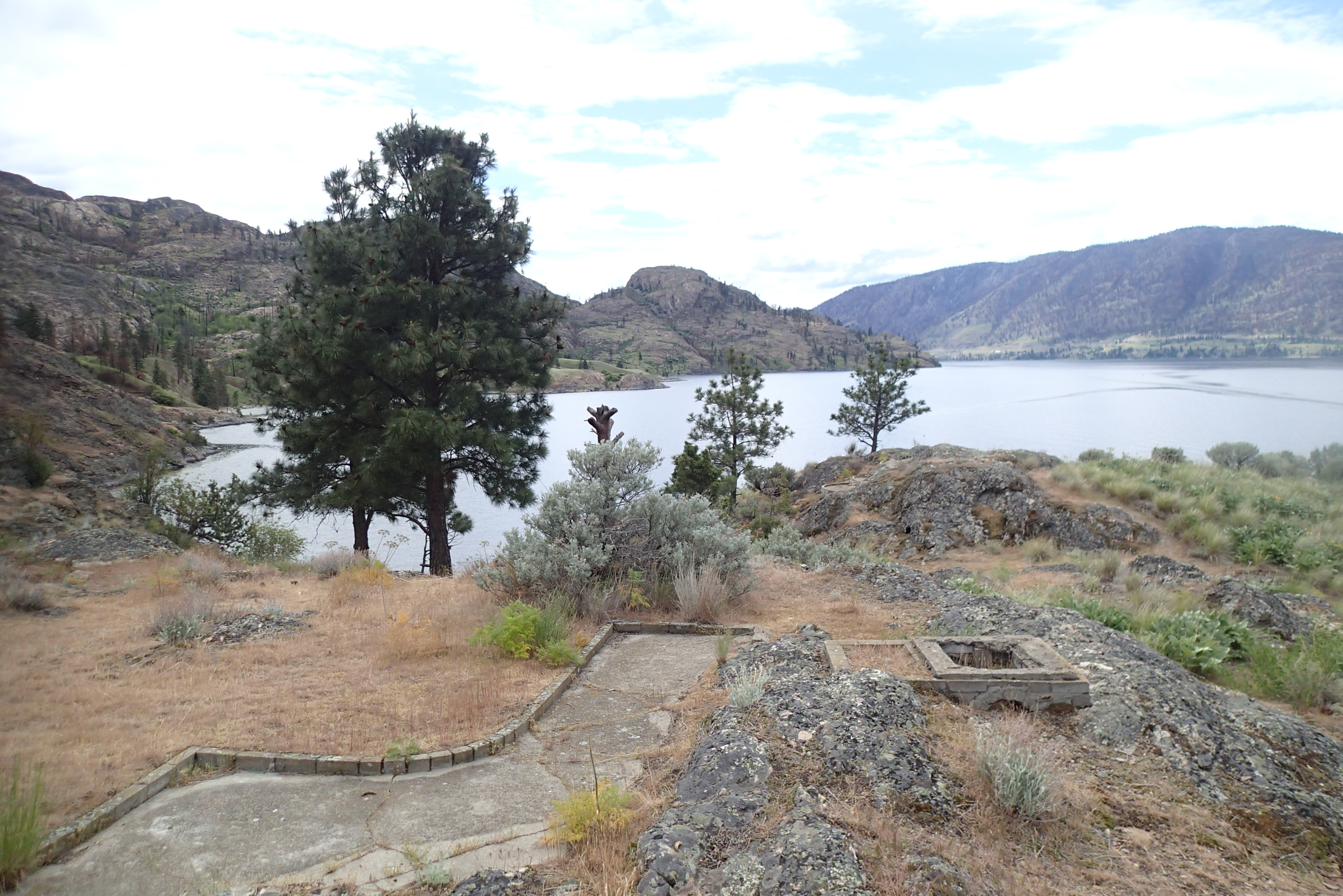
One of many concrete mini golf holes from the island's development in the 1970s.
