= Rattlesnake Creek (Big Walnut Creek tributary) =

Stream in Ohio, United States

Coordinates: 40°14′9″N 82°51′3″W

Rattlesnake Creek is a stream entirely within Delaware County, Ohio. It is a tributary of Big Walnut Creek.

Rattlesnake Creek was named for the frequent rattlesnakes at the rock outcroppings along its course.

== See also ==
- List of rivers of Ohio
