= Peachland =

- District municipality
- The Corporation of the District of Peachland
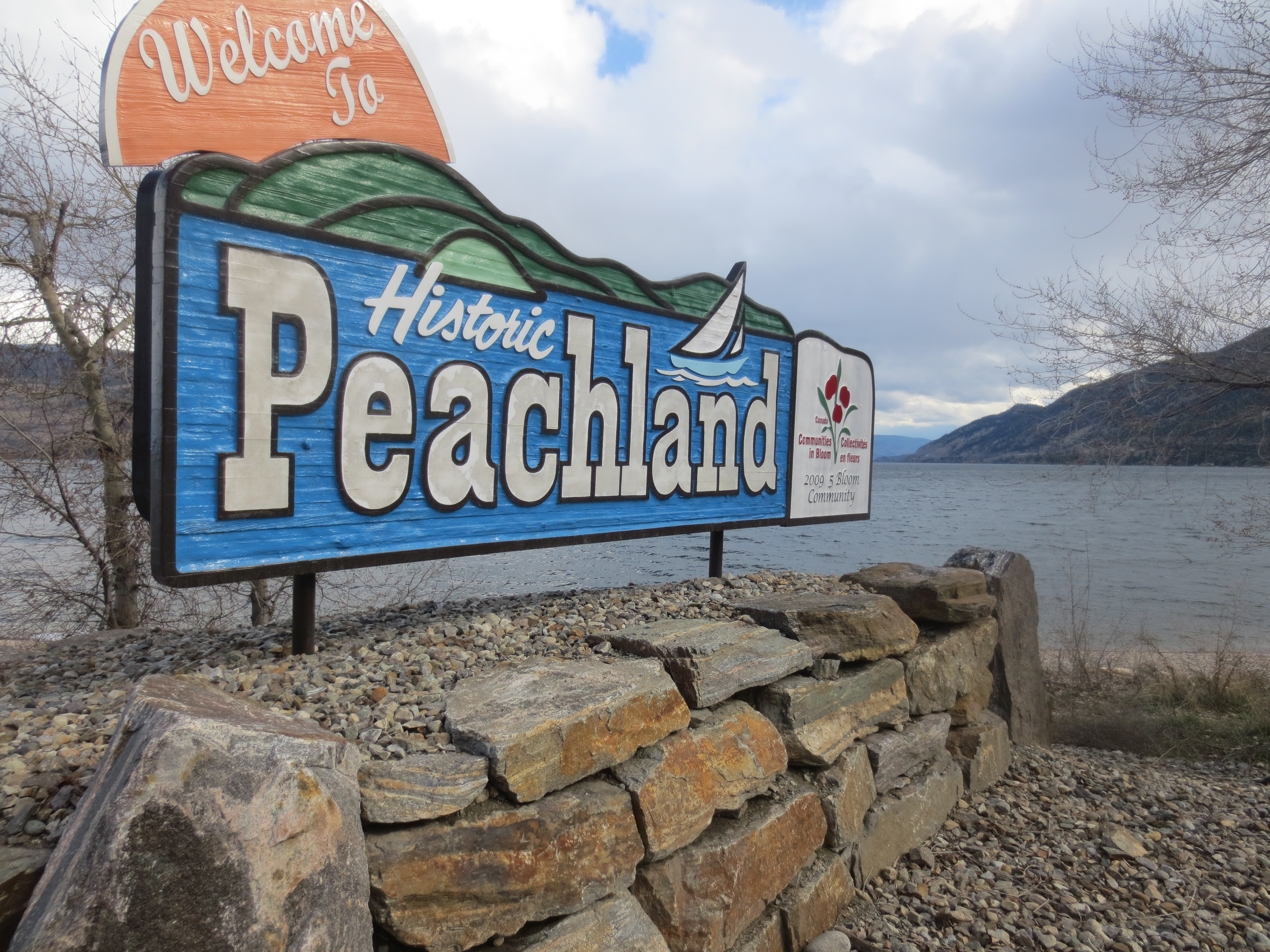

- Location of Peachland in British Columbia
- Coordinates: 49°46′26″N 119°44′11″W
- Country: Canada
- Province: British Columbia
- Regional district: Central Okanagan
- Incorporated: 1909

Government
  - Type: District Council
  - Governing body: Peachland Council
  - Mayor: Gail Mansell
  - School Trustee: Moyra Baxter
  - MP: Dan Albas

Area
  - Land: 16.1 km^{2} (6.2 sq mi)
- Elevation: 360 m (1,180 ft)

Population (2021)
  - Total: 5,789
  - Density: 360/km^{2} (930/sq mi)
- Time zone: UTC−07:00 (PT)
- Highways: 97
- Waterways: Okanagan Lake
- Website: www.peachland.ca

Peachland is a district municipality in the Okanagan Valley on the west side of Okanagan Lake in British Columbia, Canada. It was founded in 1899 by John Moore Robinson, although the region had long been home to the Okanagan people. Peachland is approximately half-an-hour's drive south of the city of Kelowna and about a 20-minute drive north of Summerland. The Okanagan Valley is very narrow in the area and there are few terraces that mark former lake levels and the former lake bottom. As a result, the city is largely located on a steep sidehill. Like many other areas in the Okanagan, Peachland is rapidly growing, with new residents coming from all across Canada. Across the lake from Peachland is Rattlesnake Island, home of the legendary Ogopogo. Peachland is approximately 370 km from Vancouver, British Columbia, on the British Columbia south coast.

== History ==
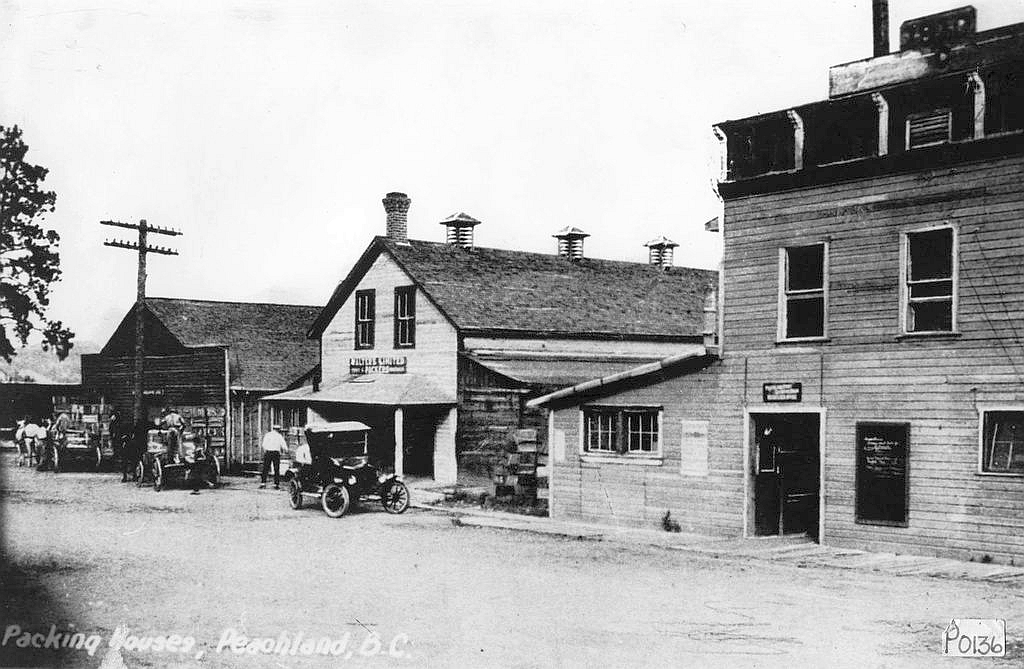
Peachland, circa 1910–1935

Peachland was founded on the site of a tiny community called Camp Hewett.

== Demographics ==
In the 2021 Census of Population conducted by Statistics Canada, Peachland had a population of 5,789 living in 2,689 of its 2,936 total private dwellings, a change of 6.7% from its 2016 population of 5,428. With a land area of 16.1 km^{2} (6.2 sq mi), it had a population density of 359.6/km^{2} (931.3/sq mi) in 2021.

Historical population

Year	Pop.	±%
1921	466	—
1931	318	−31.8%
1941	479	+50.6%
1951	614	+28.2%
1956	705	+14.8%
1961	641	−9.1%

Year	Pop.	±%
1966	709	+10.6%
1971	1,446	+103.9%
1976	2,286	+58.1%
1981	2,865	+25.3%
1986	2,988	+4.3%
1991	3,459	+15.8%

Year	Pop.	±%
1996	4,524	+30.8%
2001	4,654	+2.9%
2006	4,883	+4.9%
2011	5,200	+6.5%
2016	5,428	+4.4%
2021	5,789	+6.7%

Sources: Statistics Canada

=== Ethnicity ===
Panethnic groups in the District of Peachland (2001−2021)
Panethnic group	2021		2016		2011		2006		2001	
Panethnic group	Pop.	%	Pop.	%	Pop.	%	Pop.	%	Pop.	%
European (Note: Statistic includes all persons that did not make up part of a visible minority or an indigenous identity.)	5,265	91.33%	4,970	91.7%	4,865	94.47%	4,650	95.19%	4,515	96.99%
Indigenous	280	4.86%	310	5.72%	180	3.5%	135	2.76%	30	0.64%
East Asian (Note: Statistic includes total responses of "Chinese", "Korean", and "Japanese" under visible minority section on census.)	85	1.47%	50	0.92%	20	0.39%	75	1.54%	70	1.5%
Southeast Asian (Note: Statistic includes total responses of "Filipino" and "Southeast Asian" under visible minority section on census.)	35	0.61%	35	0.65%	0	0%	0	0%	20	0.43%
African	30	0.52%	10	0.18%	0	0%	0	0%	0	0%
South Asian	25	0.43%	45	0.83%	35	0.68%	10	0.2%	15	0.32%
Latin American	10	0.17%	0	0%	0	0%	0	0%	10	0.21%
Middle Eastern (Note: Statistic includes total responses of "West Asian" and "Arab" under visible minority section on census.)	0	0%	10	0.18%	0	0%	0	0%	10	0.21%
Other/multiracial (Note: Statistic includes total responses of "Visible minority, n.i.e." and "Multiple visible minorities" under visible minority section on census.)	30	0.52%	0	0%	0	0%	10	0.2%	10	0.21%
Total responses	5,765	99.59%	5,420	99.85%	5,150	99.04%	4,885	100.04%	4,655	100.02%
Total population	5,789	100%	5,428	100%	5,200	100%	4,883	100%	4,654	100%
Note: Totals greater than 100% due to multiple origin responses.

=== Religion ===
According to the 2021 census, religious groups in Peachland included:

- Irreligion (3,165 persons or 54.9%)
- Christianity (2,465 persons or 42.8%)
- Judaism (30 persons or 0.5%)
- Buddhism (15 persons or 0.3%)
- Indigenous Spirituality (15 persons or 0.3%)
- Sikhism (10 persons or 0.2%)
- Other (60 persons or 1.0%)

== Government ==
Federally, Peachland is, since 2022, within the electoral district of Okanagan Lake West-South Kelowna. From 2015 to 2022 it was in Central Okanagan — Similkameen — Nicola. The current MP is Conservative Dan Albas, re-elected in the 2025 election by a narrow margin. The local MLA for the area is Macklin McCall. The municipal government of Peachland consists of the mayor and six at-large councillors, elected to three-year terms.

One former councillor, Jean Fraser, was elected in 1995 and served several consecutive terms. In her last election she received the highest number of votes in the municipality's history. Fraser retired from council on November 13, 2011, as she felt the work she could do on council was complete. The current mayor is Patrick Van Minsel who defeated Cindy Fortin by a landslide vote in the 2022 municipal election.

== Climate ==
The climate of Peachland is very similar to that of neighboring Kelowna, but with a greater moderating influence from Okanagan Lake. This is partly due to its proximity to the water, as well as the greater width of the lake in this area (up to 5 kilometres). As most of the city is built into a mountainside, it is typically shielded from cold northerly winds and also has an overall southern exposure. This helps warm the area slightly during spring, summer, and fall, but particularly in winter. Proximity to the lake results in more moderation relative to Okanagan cities that are farther away from it. Average January high temperatures in Peachland are nearly 1.5 degrees warmer than in Kelowna, while the reverse is true in July.

The city's southern orientation provides protection from winds from the north while also encouraging those from the south, which blow across the lake directly toward the city and can cause mild lake-effect snow. The steep mountainside on which Peachland is built can enhance this effect somewhat via the action of orographic lift. Ordinarily, precipitation in the Okanagan generally decreases from north to south, with the city of Vernon receiving approximately 4 more inches of rain and snow per year than the city of Penticton and 2 more inches than Kelowna.

Climate data for Peachland
Month	Jan	Feb	Mar	Apr	May	Jun	Jul	Aug	Sep	Oct	Nov	Dec	Year
Record high °C (°F)	16.0 (60.8)	15.0 (59.0)	20.0 (68.0)	25.5 (77.9)	33.5 (92.3)	35.0 (95.0)	37.5 (99.5)	37.8 (100.0)	35.0 (95.0)	24.0 (75.2)	16.0 (60.8)	12.0 (53.6)	37.8 (100.0)
Mean daily maximum °C (°F)	1.9 (35.4)	4.3 (39.7)	9.7 (49.5)	14.9 (58.8)	19.8 (67.6)	23.3 (73.9)	27.2 (81.0)	26.4 (79.5)	20.9 (69.6)	13.5 (56.3)	6.2 (43.2)	1.6 (34.9)	14.1 (57.5)
Daily mean °C (°F)	−0.2 (31.6)	1.4 (34.5)	5.4 (41.7)	9.7 (49.5)	14.3 (57.7)	18.0 (64.4)	21.4 (70.5)	20.8 (69.4)	15.8 (60.4)	9.6 (49.3)	3.7 (38.7)	−0.5 (31.1)	10.0 (49.9)
Mean daily minimum °C (°F)	−2.4 (27.7)	−1.6 (29.1)	1.1 (34.0)	4.5 (40.1)	8.7 (47.7)	12.6 (54.7)	15.6 (60.1)	15.3 (59.5)	10.6 (51.1)	5.6 (42.1)	1.1 (34.0)	−2.5 (27.5)	5.7 (42.3)
Record low °C (°F)	−23 (−9)	−21 (−6)	−16.1 (3.0)	−3 (27)	−0.6 (30.9)	4.0 (39.2)	7.0 (44.6)	6.0 (42.8)	−5.6 (21.9)	−14 (7)	−23.5 (−10.3)	−25 (−13)	−25 (−13)
Average precipitation mm (inches)	43.3 (1.70)	24.3 (0.96)	23.6 (0.93)	24.6 (0.97)	34.8 (1.37)	41.9 (1.65)	31.8 (1.25)	26.1 (1.03)	23.5 (0.93)	28.6 (1.13)	45.2 (1.78)	45.8 (1.80)	393.4 (15.49)
Average rainfall mm (inches)	19.6 (0.77)	14.2 (0.56)	18.6 (0.73)	24.4 (0.96)	34.8 (1.37)	41.9 (1.65)	31.8 (1.25)	26.1 (1.03)	23.5 (0.93)	28.4 (1.12)	31.8 (1.25)	14.5 (0.57)	309.5 (12.19)
Average snowfall cm (inches)	23.8 (9.4)	10.1 (4.0)	5.0 (2.0)	0.1 (0.0)	0.0 (0.0)	0.0 (0.0)	0.0 (0.0)	0.0 (0.0)	0.0 (0.0)	0.2 (0.1)	13.3 (5.2)	31.3 (12.3)	83.9 (33.0)
Source: Environment Canada

== Events and industries ==
Peachland is home to several events and industries. Hainle Vineyards, the first ice wine maker in North America, operates its organic winery in Peachland. Peachland is the location of the annual Peachland World of Wheels Car Show and the home of the legendary lake monster Ogopogo. Peachland is home to Zipzone Adventure Park, one of the highest zip lines in Canada and the world.

== Notable people ==
- George H. V. Bulyea
- James B. Hawkes

== See also ==
- Peachland Media Gallery
- Coquihalla Highway
- Highway 97
- Highway 97C
- Canadian wines
