= List of ships named Aberdeen =

Several vessels have been named Aberdeen:

- Aberdeen (1801 ship) was launched at Aberdeen as a West Indiaman. She was abandoned at sea in December 1815.
- Aberdeen (1811 ship) was launched at Quebec. She sailed to England and then traded between Quebec and Britain. She made two voyages to India under license from the British East India Company (EIC). After her return from the second, in 1820, she was no longer listed.
- SS Aberdeen (1881), the first successful steamship with a triple expansion engine – the main method of marine propulsion from then until the gradual replacement with steam turbines or marine diesel engines. She was built for the Aberdeen Line in 1881, became a Turkish troopship in World War I until a British submarine sank her in 1915.
- SS Aberdeen (1893), a steam paddle wheeler that the Canadian Pacific Railway operated on Okanagan Lake from 1893 to 1919
- SS Aberdeen (1912), a coastal whale catcher operating out of Gray's Harbor from the Canada–US border south to Cape Blanco in Oregon from 1912
- HMS Aberdeen - a Grimsby-class sloop in the British Royal Navy built in Devonport Dockyard, Plymouth. She was launched in 1936, served during World War II, and was sold for breaking up in 1949.
- SS Aberdeen Victory, a merchant ship operated during the latter stages of World War II, later commissioned as USS Altair

== See also ==
- Aberdeen (disambiguation)
