= SS Castlegar =

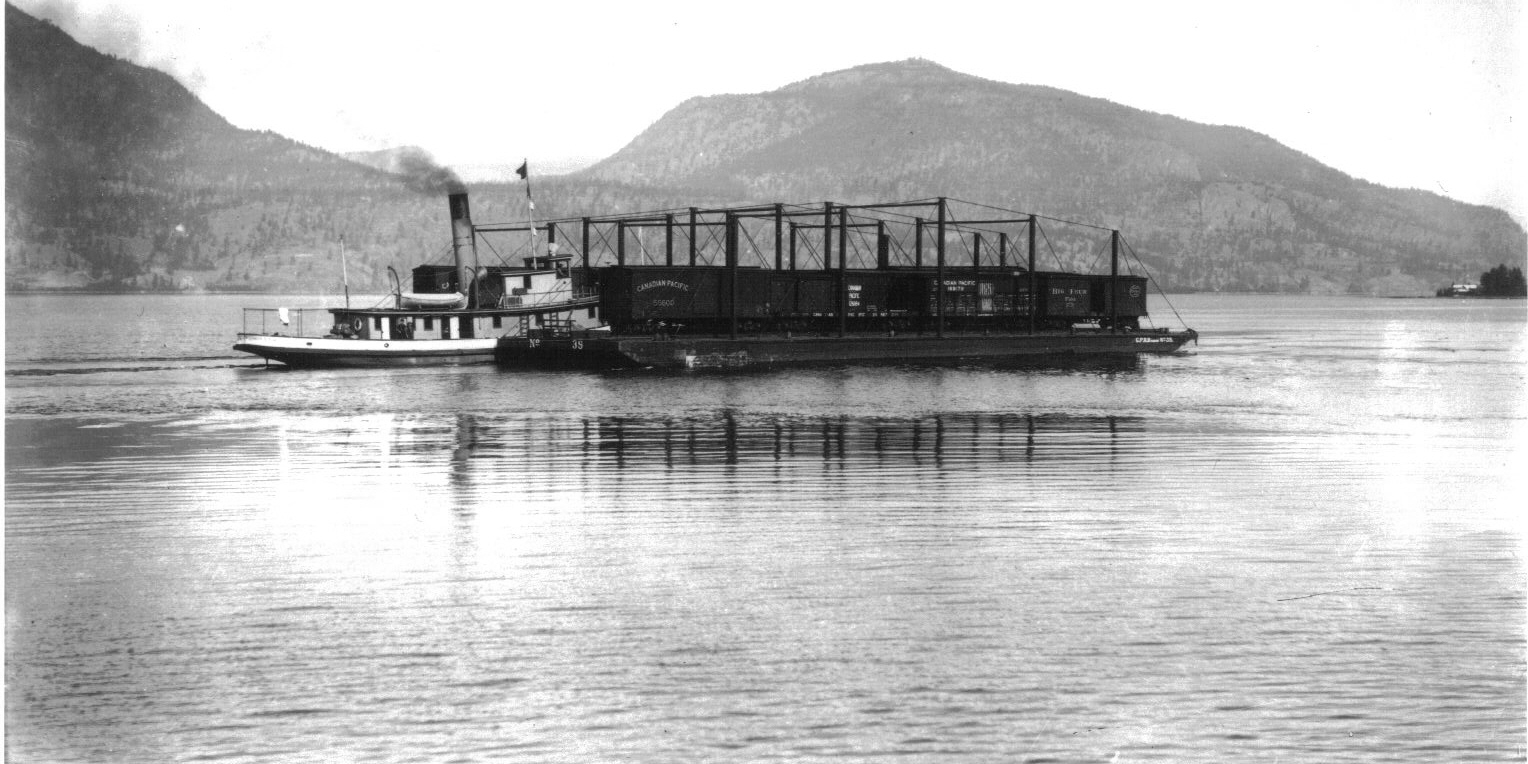
- SS Castlegar

History
- Owner: Canadian Pacific Railway
- Completed: 1911
- Out of service: 1925

Castlegar was a wooden-hulled tugboat for the Canadian Pacific Railway company. Built in 1911 at Okanagan Landing, its purpose was to handle railway car barges on Okanagan Lake. The Castlegar was a significant improvement over existing vessels in the Okanagan for service at the time.

In November 1913, Skookum was sunk in a collision with Castlegar between Trout Creek and Penticton, leading to the injuries of three men. The captain of Castlegar at the time was J. Fitzsimmons and the chief engineer on board was G. Smith.

After 12 years of service on Okanagan Lake, the tugboat was retired in 1925. The engines salvaged from Castlegar were used in Roseberry.
