= MV Skookum (1906) =

Ferry of British Columbia, Canada

History

Canada
- Operator: Len A. Hayman (1907–1911); Okanagan Lake Boat Company (1911–)
- Route: Kelowna-Westbank
- Builder: H. B. D. Lysons
- In service: 2 April 1906
- Nickname(s): Tut Tut
- Status: Registry closed

General characteristics
- Type: Ferry
- Length: 30 ft (9.1 m)
- Beam: 6 ft (1.8 m)
- Draught: 2 ft (0.61 m)
- Installed power: Turscott one-cylinder, 7 hp (5.2 kW) engine
- Speed: 8–10 mph (13–16 km/h; 7.0–8.7 kn)
- Capacity: 20 passengers

MV Skookum, also known as the Tut Tut, was a passenger ferry boat that operated on Okanagan Lake in British Columbia. The ferry was put into service on April 2, 1906 and was the first official government-subsidized ferry between the communities of Kelowna and Westbank, now West Kelowna. Skookum was built by H. B. D. Lysons and measured 30 feet (9.1 m) by 6 feet (1.8 m) by 2 feet (0.61 m). The small ferry was equipped with a Turscott single-cylinder seven horsepower engine, allowing her to reach speeds between 8 and 10 miles per hour (12.8 - 16 km/h).

The Skookum had a passenger capacity of 20 and costed 25 cents per person and one dollar per horse. In addition, Skookum had a scow that was 40 feet (12 m) by 16 feet (4.9 m) by 4 feet (1.2 m) to handle livestock or one vehicle. Since there was no two-way radio for communications onboard, two fires would be lit beside the ferry dock as a signal to the captain that a scow was needed for the next run. Skookum was granted a CAD$1000 per year subsidy to run two round trips daily, except Sundays, for three years.

In 1907, the ferry charter was bought by Captain Len A. Hayman, who continued the service until 1911, when the Okanagan Lake Boat Company, owned by Peter Roe, took her over. Roe and his brothers, Fred and Gerald, then operated Skookum and another ship, MV Trepanier, for many years.
