= Thomas Ellis (Irish emigrant) =

Thomas Ellis was the first European settler in the area known today as Penticton, British Columbia, Canada. He was the biggest cattle baron in the South Okanagan area.

== Background ==
Thomas Ellis was born in Ireland but left for British Columbia when he was nineteen. In January 1865, Ellis sailed for British Columbia and arrived in Victoria in March 1865. It was in the late 1860s that Ellis began to accumulate large acreages in the South Okanagan. His original holding had 642.35 acres and was located on a large piece of land in modern-day Penticton.

Ellis returned to Ireland and married Wilhemina Wade on February 10, 1873. Ellis and his wife would have nine children together. Wilhemina would become well known for her nursing skills in the Okanagan. After his marriage, Ellis returned to the Okanagan and by the 1890s he had 20,000 heads of cattle and 31,000 acres of land from the South Okanagan all the way to the Canada–US border. Mining companies provided a good market for his beef. Although Ellis claimed all of that land as his own, much of the land that his cattle roamed on was not actually owned by him, he built up his empire based on grazing rights.

In the 1890s, Ellis arrived in the Mission Valley and purchased a pioneer ranch. Ellis' ranch had three stacks of premium hay in the yard. When he brought up his cattle, he found that two-thirds of his premium hay had burned. In the following investigation and trial, Arthur Booth (A.B.) Knox was found guilty of arson, although there was much doubt from early Kelowna residents as to whether he actually burned the hay.

Ellis later entered into a partnership with Captain Thomas Shorts and he invested in Shorts' next business venture; a large ferry boat which was to be called the Penticton. The boat only lasted a short time before Ellis and Thomas Shorts sold the boat to Leon Lequime for five thousand dollars in 1892.

In the early half of the 1890s, Ellis started to think about selling his empire. He entered an agreement with the Penticton Townsite Company. he sold his land and it became part of the City of Penticton. Ellis also sold some of his land to Southern Okanagan Land Company who then sold it to the Okanagan Falls Townsite for development.
