= Thomas Shorts =

Canadian sailor

Thomas Dorling Shorts was a Canadian sailor, and one of the early captains on the Okanagan Lake. Shorts started the lakeboat service on Okanagan Lake in the Penticton area.

== Ruth Shorts ==
Ruth Shorts was Thomas Shorts's first boat. She was named for his mother. Ruth Shorts was a 22-foot-long (6.7 m) rowboat that could make a roundtrip from Penticton to Okanagan Landing in nine days. Ruth Shorts could carry 2.5 tons of cargo as well as a few passengers. Occasionally, the boat would sport a sail if the weather permitted it. Captain Shorts had no schedule; he left when he wanted or when there was enough people to make the trip worthwhile. Shorts would row during the day and when dusk fell he would row ashore and camp on land with his passengers for the night. Captain Shorts would row sixty-five miles per trip.

== Mary Victoria Greenhow ==
In 1884, Shorts owned and operated the Mary Victoria Greenhow. She was a 35-foot-long (11 m) steamer that operated on the same route the Ruth Shorts did. The Mary Victoria Greenhow had the capacity to carry five tons of freight and several passengers. She ran on kerosene. After only a short time in operation, the Mary Victoria Greenhow was destroyed by a fire.

== Jubilee ==
In 1887, Shorts salvaged the engine from the burned Mary Victoria Greenhow and modified it so that it was powered by burning wood, and he installed this engine in his new boat, the Jubilee. The Jubilee was thirty feet long and could tow a barge. In 1889, only two years after she began operation, she sank.

== Penticton ==
In 1890, Shorts partnered with Thomas Ellis to improve the lake service in the Okanagan. Ellis could provide the funds that Shorts needed. Together, they had a new boat ordered. Meanwhile, Shorts took the engine from the Jubilee and attached it to a scow and called his new creation the City of Vernon. He used the City of Vernon until the new boat was ready. The new boat, named Penticton, was a 70-foot-long (21 m) twin screw steamer. After only two years of operation, Shorts and Ellis sold the Penticton to Leon Lequime of Kelowna for five thousand dollars.

== Later years ==
Shorts had never been big on luxury, so when the Canadian Pacific Railway entered the lake service with the SS Aberdeen, Shorts could not, despite his many efforts, compete with them. Not long after the Aberdeen was launched Shorts left the lake service. He headed for the Klondike hoping to strike it rich.
