= Okanagan Lake =

Lake in British Columbia, Canada

Okanagan Lake kɬúsx̌nítkw
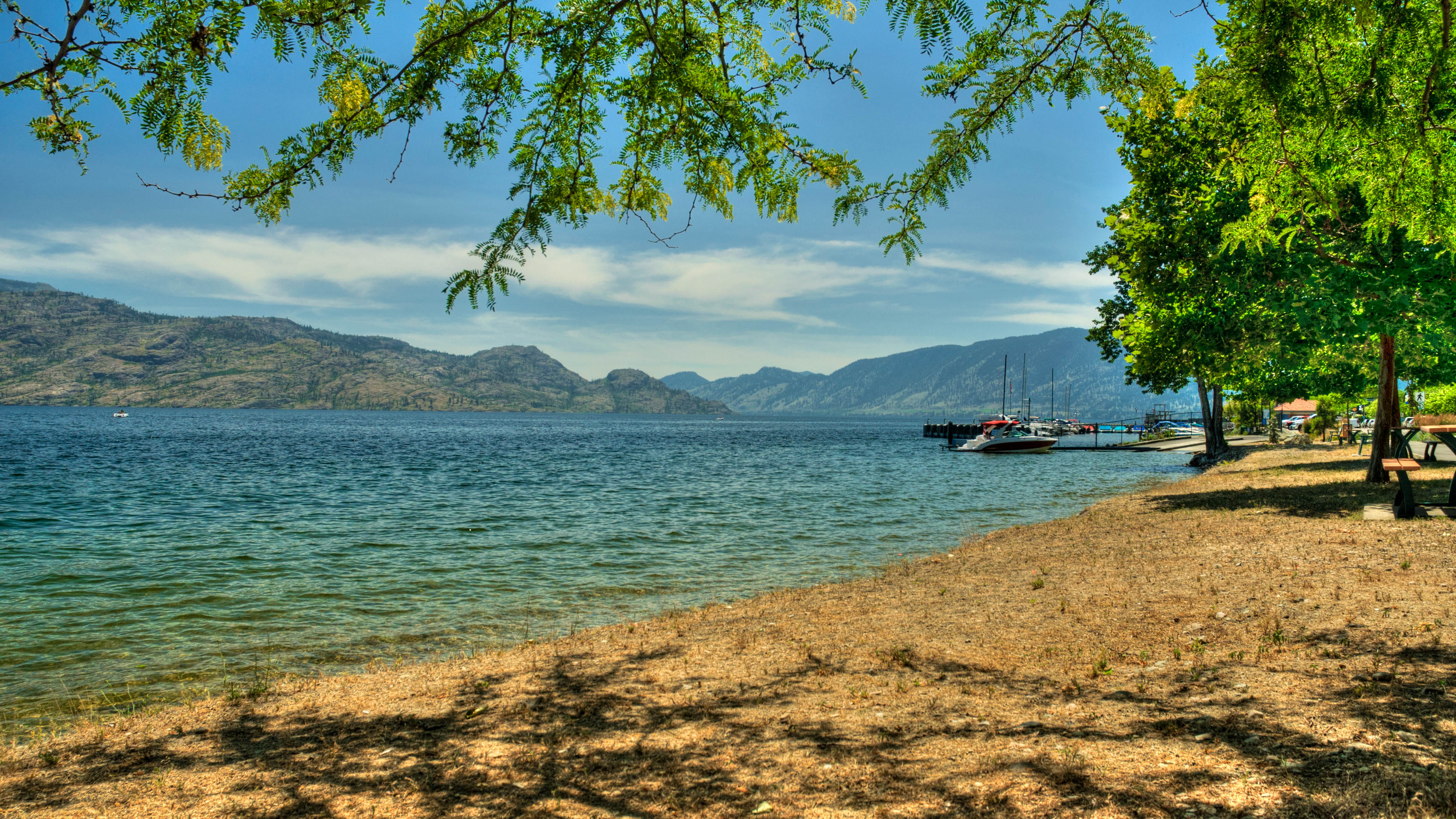

- Location within British Columbia
- Location: British Columbia, Canada
- Coordinates: 49°54′40″N 119°30′45″W
- Lake type: Fjord Lake, Monomictic, Oligotrophic
- Primary inflows: Mission Creek, Vernon Creek, Trout Creek, Penticton Creek, Equesis Creek, Kelowna Creek, Peachland Creek, Powers Creek, Whiteman Creek
- Primary outflows: Okanagan River
- Catchment area: 6,200 km^{2} (2,400 sq mi)
- Basin countries: Canada
- Max. length: 135 kilometres (84 mi)
- Max. width: 5 kilometres (3.1 mi)
- Surface area: 348 square kilometres (134 sq mi)
- Average depth: 76 m (249 ft)
- Max. depth: 232 m (761 ft)
- Water volume: 24.6 cubic kilometres (5.9 mi^{3})
- Residence time: 52.8 years
- Shore length^{1}: 270 kilometres (170 mi)
- Surface elevation: 342 m (1,122 ft)
- Frozen: 1906/07 & 1949/50
- Islands: Rattlesnake Island, Grant Island
- Settlements: Vernon, Lake Country, Kelowna, West Kelowna, Peachland, Summerland, Penticton
- ^{1} Shore length is not a well-defined measure.

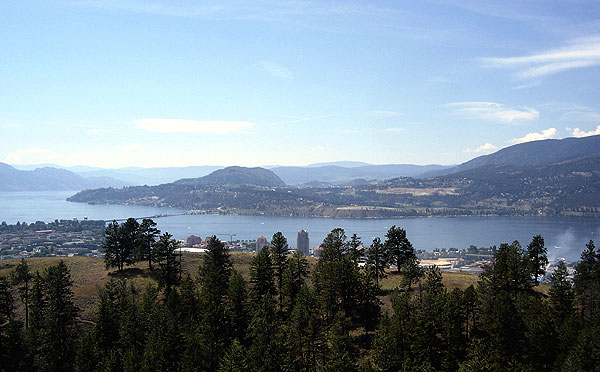
Okanagan Lake winds between Kelowna (foreground) and Westbank (background).

Okanagan Lake (Okanagan: kɬúsx̌nítkw) is a lake in the Okanagan Valley of British Columbia, Canada. The lake is 135 km (84 mi) long, between 4 and 5 km (2.5 and 3.1 mi) wide, and has a surface area of 348 km^{2} (135 sq. mi.).

== Hydrography ==
Okanagan Lake is called a fjord lake as it has been carved out by repeated glaciations. Although the lake contains numerous lacustrine terraces, it is not uncommon for the lake to be 100 metres (328 ft) deep only 10 metres (11 yd) offshore. Major inflows include Mission, Vernon, Trout, Penticton, Equesis, Kelowna, Peachland and Powers Creeks. The lake is drained by the Okanagan River, which exits the lake's south end via a canal through the city of Penticton to Skaha Lake, whence the river continues southwards into the rest of the South Okanagan and through Okanogan County, Washington to its confluence with the Columbia.

The lake's maximum depth is 232 metres (761 ft) near Grant Island (Nahun Weenox). There are three other islands: one known as Rattlesnake Island, much farther south by Squally Point. The other two are near Grant Island. They are unnamed and are located just north of the north-point of Whisky Cove at Carrs Landing. Some areas of the lake have up to 750 metres (2,460 ft) of glacial and post-glacial sediment fill which were deposited during the Pleistocene Epoch.

Notable features of the Okanagan Valley include terraces which were formed due to the periodic lowering of the lake's predecessor, glacial Lake Penticton. These terraces are now used extensively for agriculture such as fruit cultivation.

== Geographical context ==
Cities bordering the lake include Vernon in the north, Penticton in the south, and Kelowna, as well as the municipalities of Lake Country (north of Kelowna), West Kelowna (west of Kelowna), Peachland (south of West Kelowna), and Summerland (north-west of Penticton). Unincorporated communities include Naramata (north-east of Penticton).

Various lake features include Rattlesnake Island (a small island east of Peachland), Squally Point (a popular cliff-diving area) & Fintry Delta on the west side.

The five-lane William R. Bennett Bridge, a floating bridge with a high boat passage arch connects Kelowna to the city of West Kelowna and the community of Westbank. This bridge replaced the three-lane floating Okanagan Lake Bridge on May 30, 2008, which had a lift span for passage of large boats.

== Steamboats ==
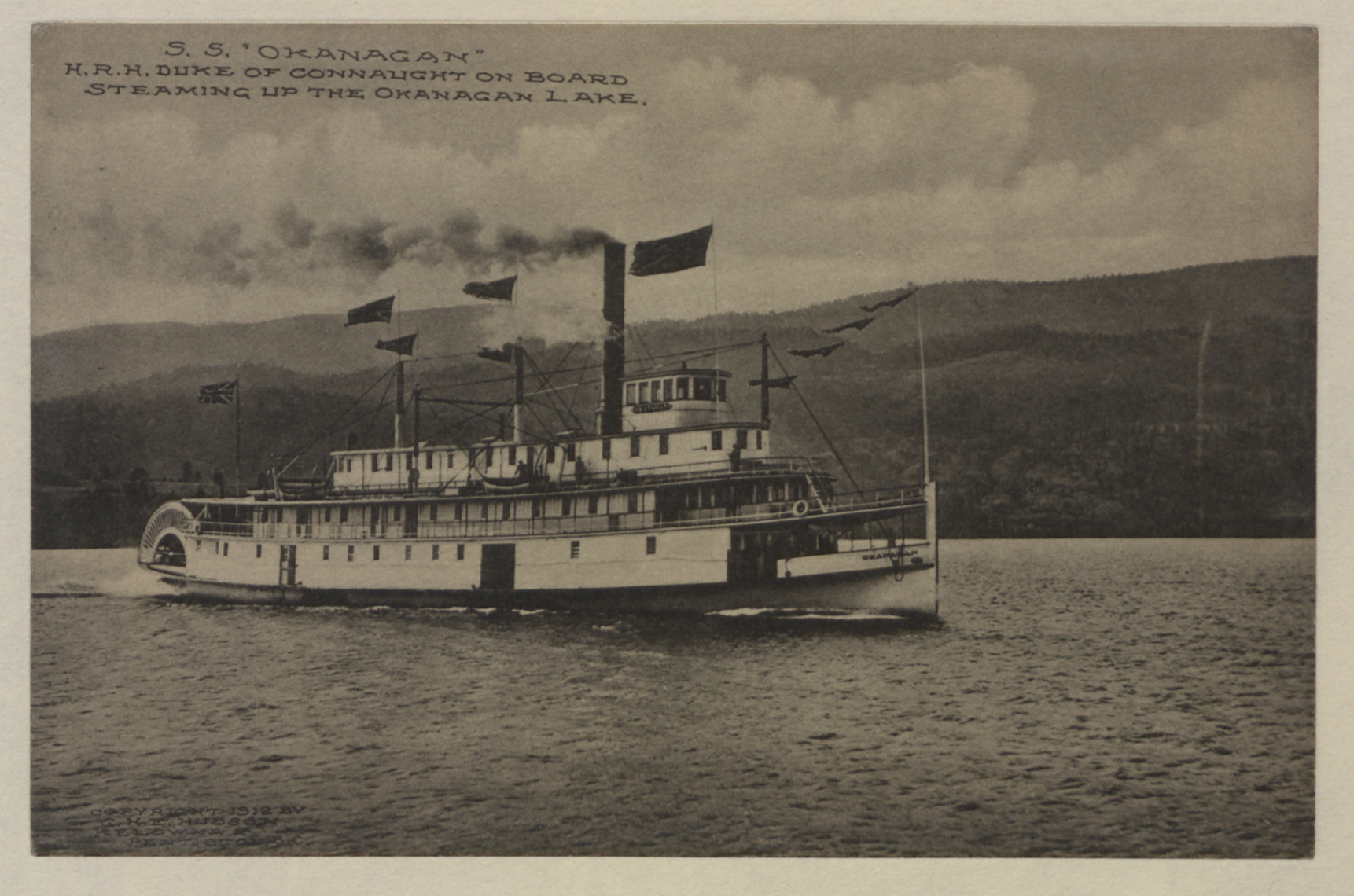
SS Okanagan, with the Duke of Connaught on board, 1912

During the early days of settlement and development of the Okanagan region, the lack of roads in the region made the lake a natural corridor for passenger travel and freight. The Canadian Pacific Railway Lake and River Service was the main carrier on the lakes, providing freight and passenger connections between Penticton, on the Kettle Valley Railway (the Southern Mainline) and Okanagan Landing (Vernon) for connections to the CPR Mainline at Sicamous via the Shuswap and Okanagan Railway. Smaller vessels such as the SS Naramata provided passenger service to smaller settlements around the lake, as well as excursions for tourists.

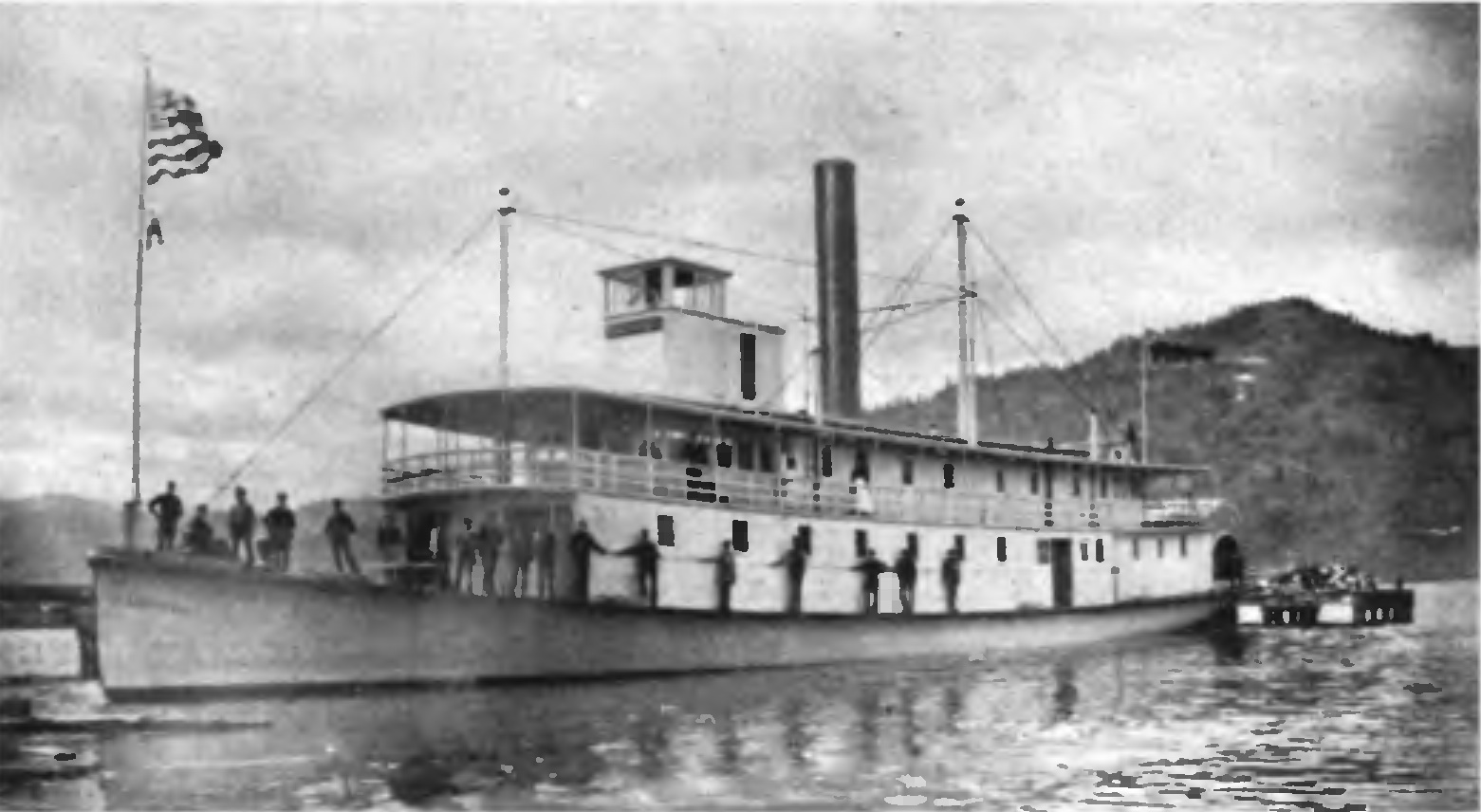
sternwheeler Aberdeen on Okanagan Lake, sometime between 1893 and 1895

=== Vessels ===
- SS York (freight)
- SS Okanagan (luxury-class passenger service)
- SS Aberdeen (luxury-class passenger service)
- SS Sicamous (luxury-class passenger service)
- SS Fairview (sternwheeler)
- SS Naramata (excursion and water-taxi)
- MV Lequime (Fintry Queen, excursion and water-taxi)
- MV Lloyd-Jones - 1950-1960 (Bowen Queen 1960–1965, MV Vesuvius Queen 1965–1998)
- MV Pendozi (steel ferry)
- SS Kelowna (steam tug)
- SS Castlegar (steam tug)
- MV Aricia (ferry)
- SS Clovelly (ferry) (ferry)
- MV Grace Darling (1919 ferry)
- MV Grace Darling (1923 ferry)
- Canadian National Tug no. 6 (diesel tug)
- Canadian National Tug no. 5 (tug)
- MV Kelowna-Westbank (ferry)
- MV Skookum (1912) (1912 ferry)
- MV Skookum (1906) (1906 ferry)
- MV Rattlesnake (ferry)
- MV Trepanier (ferry)
- Colleen (rowboat)
- SS Maude-Moore (ferry)
- MV Mallard (ferry)
- MV Cygnet (ferry)
- SS Red Star (tug)
- SS Jubilee (early steamship)
- Ruth Shorts (rowboat)
- SS Mary Victoria Greenhow (early steamship)
- SS Wanderer (early steamship)

=== Landings ===
- Penticton
- Naramata
- Peachland
- Summerland
- Okanagan Mission
- Kelowna
- Okanagan Landing (Vernon)
- Fintry
- Carr's Landing
- Ewing (Ewing's Landing)
- Killiney Beach

== Recreation ==
Many parks and beaches are found along the shores of the lake, which make boating and swimming very popular activities.

The lake is home to several species of fish, including rainbow trout and kokanee. It is said by some to be home to its own lake monster – a giant serpent-like creature named Ogopogo.

A submarine was specially used in 1986 by the Okanagan Center society.

== Images ==
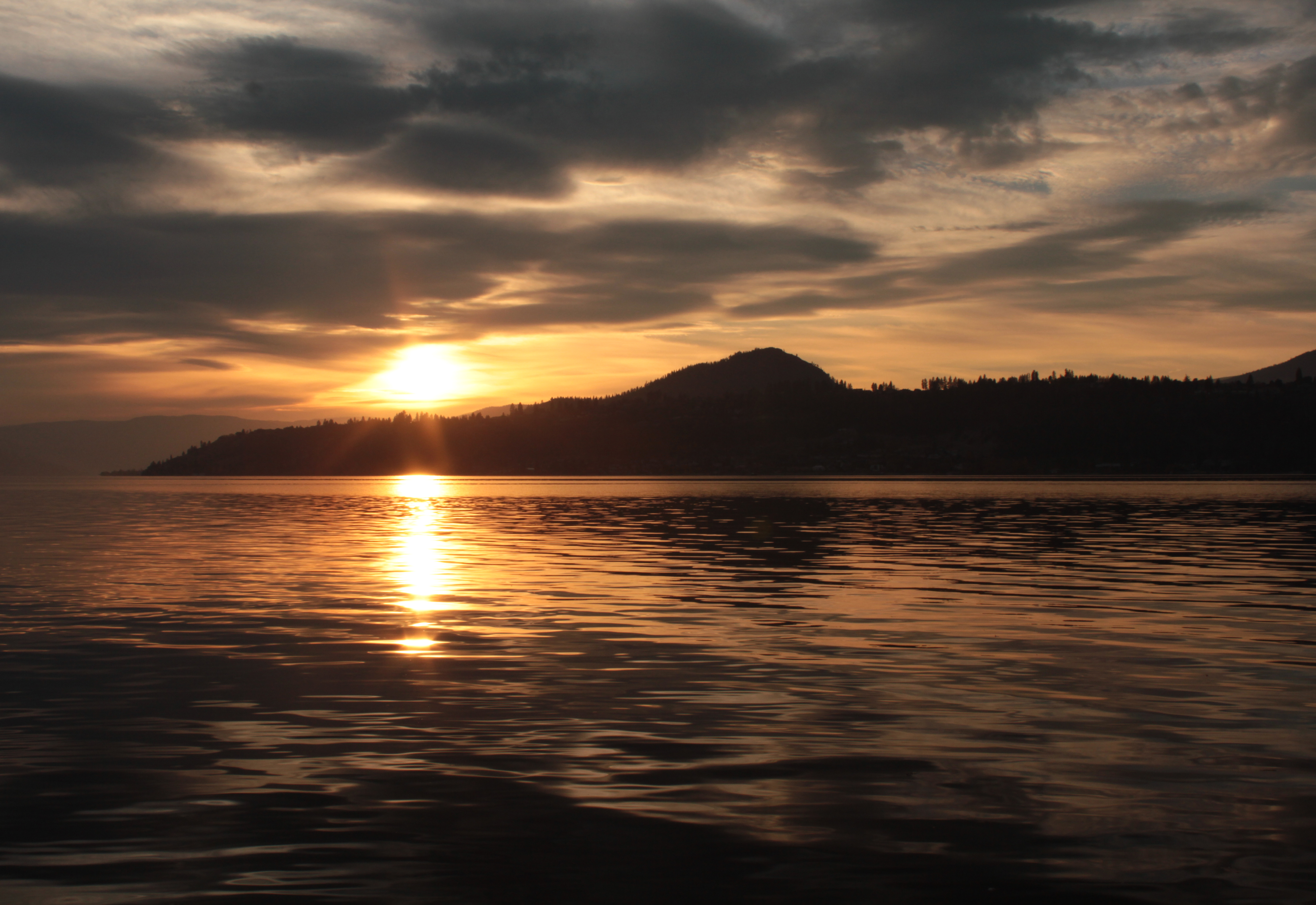
Maude Roxby Wetlands sunset

Boyce-Gyro Beach on a Winter Afternoon

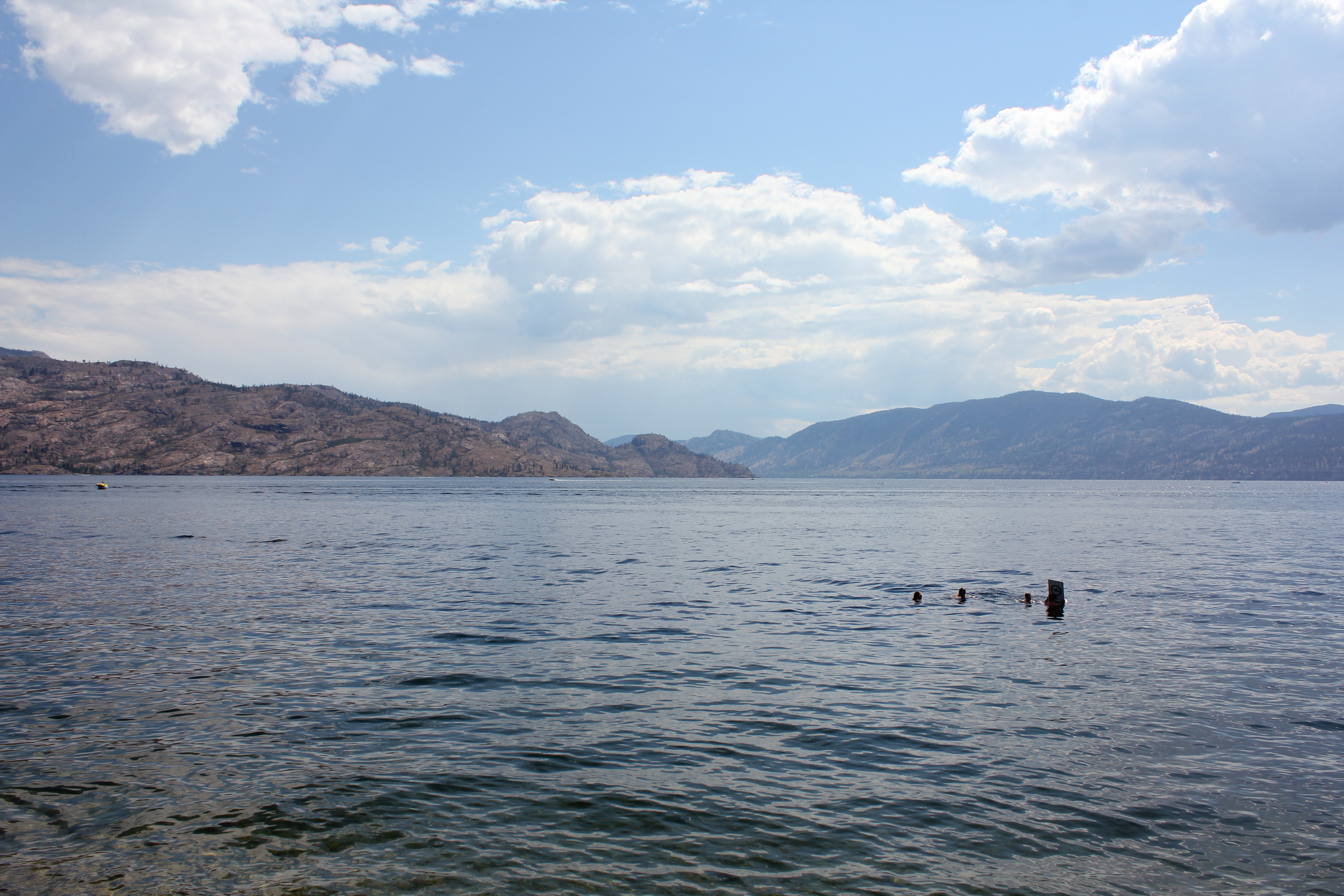
Swimmers in Peachland

Half Way Bay during Golden Hour in Winter

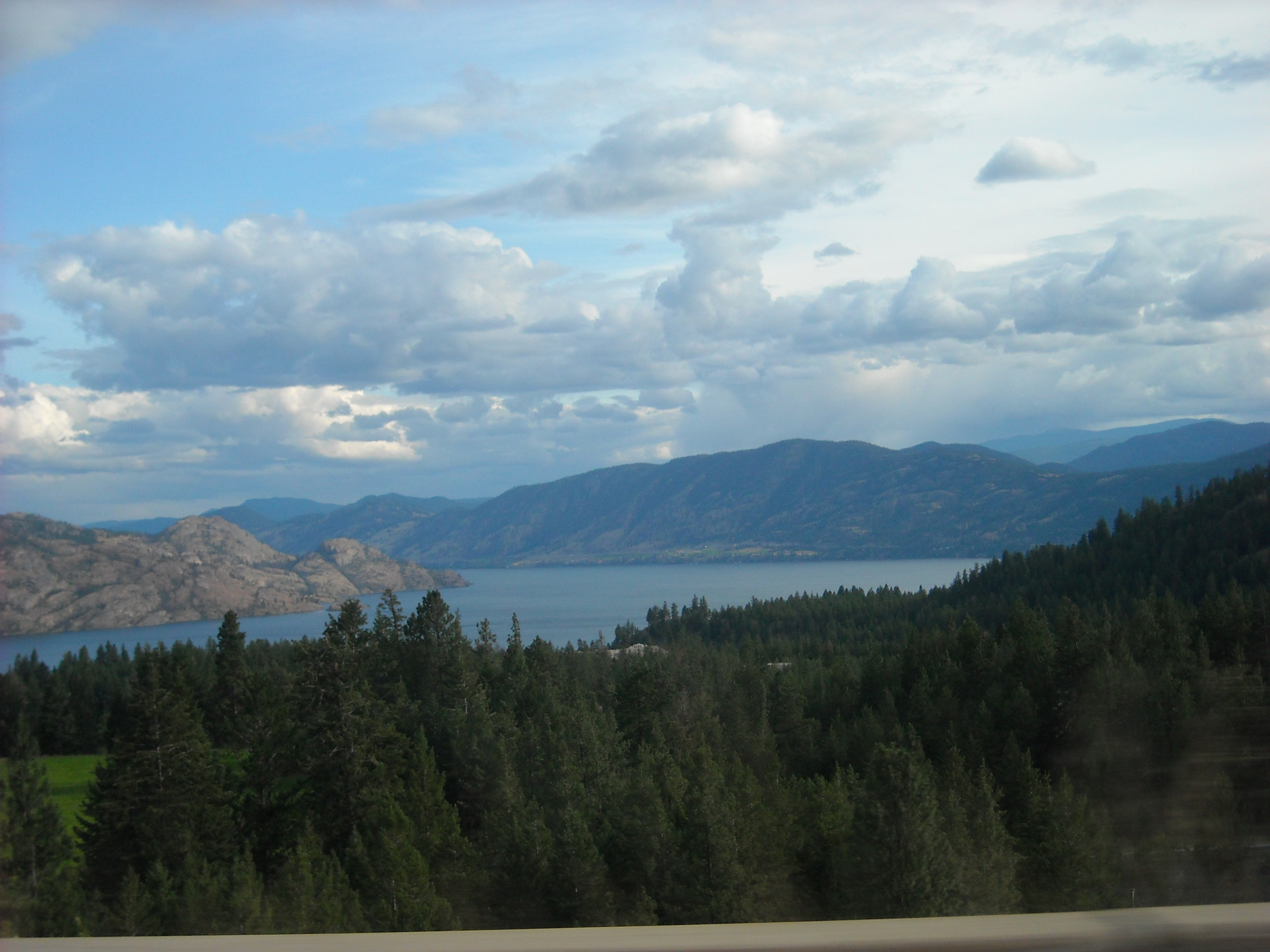
Clouds over Okanagan Lake

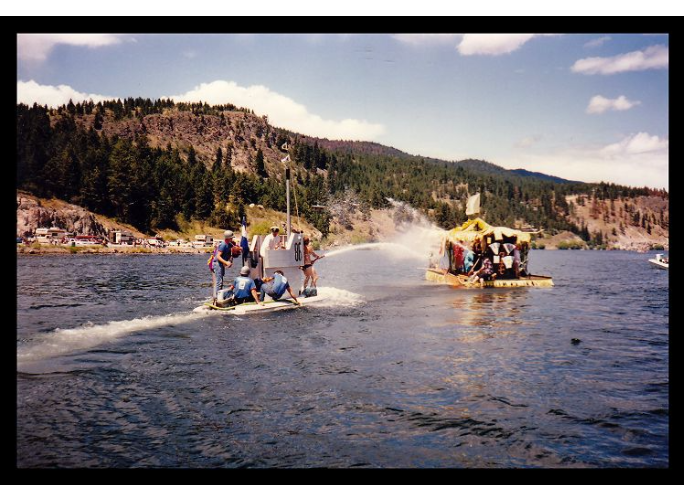
Okanagan submarine; 1986. The Henry D. Reddecopp

== See also ==
- Okanagan Falls
- Okanagan Nation, indigenous peoples
- Okanagan Trail
- List of tributaries of the Columbia River
- Skaha Lake
- Ogopogo
