= John Moore Robinson =

Canadian politician

John Moore Robinson (born in Hustonville, Wellington County, Canada West in December 1855 – died February 23, 1934) was a pioneer, rancher, prospector, politician and orchardist who helped shape British Columbia's Okanagan Valley region through, among other things, the establishment of such communities as Naramata, Summerland, and Peachland.

== Biography ==
=== Education and early career ===
The son of William Robinson, an Irish-born merchant, and Maria Moore, he was educated in Hustonville, in Lockport, New York and in St. Catharines, Ontario. He taught school for four years in Ontario, and then, in 1879, he moved to Manitoba, where he taught in Woodlands for two more years. In 1882, Robinson married Eliza Lipsett. He was the editor and publisher of the Brandon Times, the Portage la Prairie Tribune and the Portage la Prairie Review. Robinson also served as clerk for Woodlands and for Portage la Prairie. He was later employed in the real estate business in Portage la Prairie.

He was elected to the Manitoba assembly for the Woodlands constituency in 1886 as a Conservative. Robinson was defeated when he ran for reelection in 1888.

=== Work in British Columbia ===
Robinson arrived in the Okanagan Valley from Manitoba in 1897 as a prospector. Inspired by early local ranchers such as John Carmichael Haynes and James and Fred Gartrell, Robinson purchased a ranch, which he renamed "Peachland", and took up selling parcels of arable land for the establishment of orchards. Unlike other ranchers of the time, who grew but a few fruit trees on their property to serve the family and workmen, the Gartrells harvested some of their fruit for sale, and expanding on this concept with dedicated orchards, Robinson is credited with founding the soft fruit industry.

After establishing the town of Peachland in 1899, Robinson founded Summerland, south of Peachland, in 1902, under the patronage of then-CPR president, Sir Thomas Shaughnessy. In 1907, Robinson founded the hillside town of Naramata.

Upon incorporating the Peachland Townsite and Irrigation Company in 1899, Robinson implemented a new water management system, laying out creek-fed irrigation to supply 1,000 acres (4.0 km^{2}) of orchard, which he had subdivided into 10-acre (40,000 m^{2}) lots.

Robinson employed the same land development formula in Summerland and Naramata, encouraging other land development companies to follow in his footsteps, heralding a new era of corporate land management and irrigation.

He died in Naramata at the age of 78.

== See also ==
- Okanagan people
- History of British Columbia
