= Naramata =

Naramata citxʷs paqəlqyn
- Community
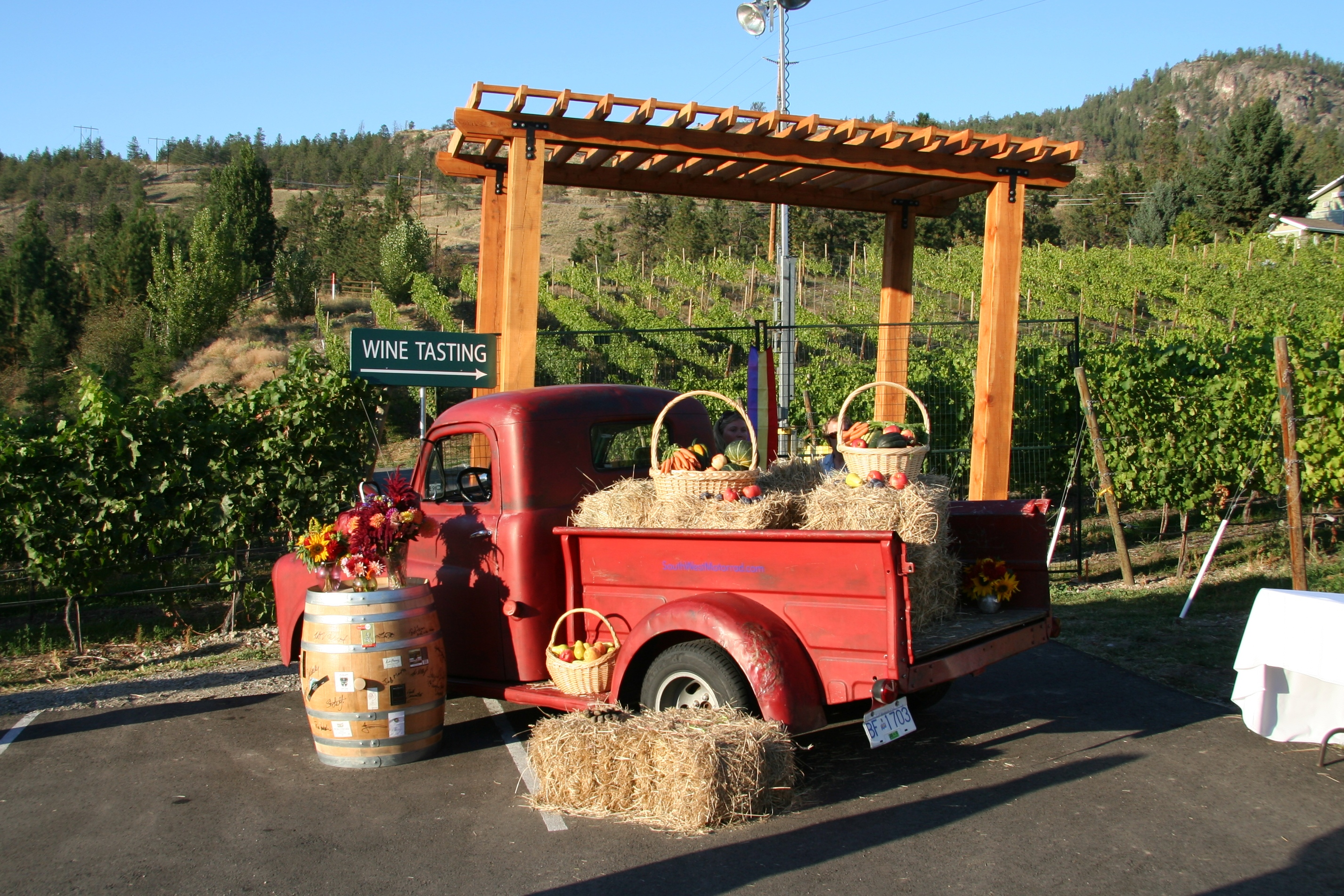
- A wine tasting in Naramata wine country

- Location of Naramata in British Columbia
- Coordinates: 49°35′N 119°35′W
- Country: Canada
- Province: British Columbia
- Region: Okanagan
- Regional district: Okanagan-Similkameen

Population (2021)
  - Total: 1,628
  - Density: 200.7/km^{2} (520/sq mi)
- Time zone: UTC-7 (Pacific Time)
- Area codes: 250, 778, 236, & 672

Naramata is an unincorporated community in the Okanagan region of south central British Columbia, Canada. On the eastern shore of southern Okanagan Lake, the locality is by road about 15 kilometres (9 mi) north of Penticton.

== Name origin ==
In November 1906, John Moore Robinson purchased land. Over the following nine months, the name changed from Nine Mile Point to East Summerland, to Brighton Beach, and finally to Naramata. Spiritualism was a popular past time at the time and Robinson claimed the name came in a séance. The name itself derives from a First Nations word or an Australian Aboriginal one, but supporting evidence is lacking.

== First Nations ==
The Syilx name for the area is “Citxws Peqlqin," or "Eagle's House." The Naramata bench provided a seasonal camp site for elk hunting and food gathering.

== Early community ==
Robinson advertised and sold parcels of land to people from other parts of Canada as well as the British Isles. At the time Naramata became known as a cultural centre. People from across the Okanagan would arrive by boat for concerts, plays, operas, regattas- and as Robinson and his wife were spiritualists-seances. Paddlewheelers regularly stopped at the local wharf carrying freight and passengers up and down Lake Okanagan.

== Ferry ==
In March 1908, an east–west Summerland–East Summerland charter ferry service commenced. The first two operators proved unsatisfactory. That October, Summerland Trust Co. took over. In 1911, the Okanagan Lake Boat Co. implemented a run via Penticton. The 1913 tender charter continued to name the locality as East Summerland. In July 1926, the service ceased.

== Railway ==
In 1914, Naramata received a new link with the rest of Canada when the Kettle Valley Railway was completed on the hillside above the village. Due to the intense volume of rock work it gained the reputation as one of the most difficult stretches of KVR construction. It was in operation until 1974. Today, remnants of the KVR make for great exploration, such as the train tunnels, rock ovens, and the railway right-of-way which clings to the hillside high above the lake, and is now part of the Trans-Canada Trail.

== Economy ==
The many orchards have included varieties of peach, plum, pear, cherry, apricot and apple. Naramata is more known now, however, as a top wine-producing region in the country and its wineries have begun to attract international acclaim. The decline in the relative economic importance of fruit growing has occurred but the impressive landscape still abounds with orchards. The most savvy growers no longer sell to the Naramata fruit-packing facility (part of the Okanagan Tree Fruit Co-operative), but rather sell privately, often preferring to deal with international brokers.

Agriculture and tourism form the economic base of the village of Naramata. The agricultural sector once mostly consisting of orchards is rapidly being supplanted by vineyards and wineries that are collectively referred to as the "Naramata Bench". Tourism is served by motels, beach side resorts and a variety of bed and breakfast operations that cater to summertime visitors. Summer months see a spike in inhabitants and economic activity. A farmers market is held weekly and there are numerous roadside produce sellers in addition to the wineries, cideries and craft spirit producers. Since the 1960s and continuing to this day it has been a rite of passage for countless French-Canadian students to make their way across the country and pick fruit for a summer.

Much of Naramata lies within the bounds of the Agricultural Land Reserve, created by the British Columbia government in the early 1970s as a food security measure.

The Centre at Naramata, a conference and educational centre of The United Church of Canada, was founded in 1947.

== Climate ==
Naramata has a semi-arid climate (Köppen BSk).

Climate data for Naramata
Month	Jan	Feb	Mar	Apr	May	Jun	Jul	Aug	Sep	Oct	Nov	Dec	Year
Record high °C (°F)	14.5 (58.1)	16.5 (61.7)	22.0 (71.6)	29.5 (85.1)	32.5 (90.5)	36.0 (96.8)	38.5 (101.3)	37.5 (99.5)	34.5 (94.1)	25.0 (77.0)	21.0 (69.8)	11.5 (52.7)	38.5 (101.3)
Mean daily maximum °C (°F)	1.2 (34.2)	4.3 (39.7)	10.2 (50.4)	15.4 (59.7)	20.1 (68.2)	23.7 (74.7)	27.0 (80.6)	27.1 (80.8)	21.7 (71.1)	13.6 (56.5)	6.6 (43.9)	1.5 (34.7)	14.4 (57.9)
Daily mean °C (°F)	−1.2 (29.8)	1.0 (33.8)	5.5 (41.9)	9.8 (49.6)	14.0 (57.2)	17.6 (63.7)	20.4 (68.7)	20.4 (68.7)	15.7 (60.3)	9.3 (48.7)	3.8 (38.8)	−0.7 (30.7)	9.6 (49.3)
Mean daily minimum °C (°F)	−3.6 (25.5)	−2.3 (27.9)	0.8 (33.4)	4.2 (39.6)	7.9 (46.2)	11.3 (52.3)	13.6 (56.5)	13.7 (56.7)	9.7 (49.5)	4.9 (40.8)	0.9 (33.6)	−2.9 (26.8)	4.9 (40.7)
Record low °C (°F)	−21.0 (−5.8)	−21.0 (−5.8)	−13.0 (8.6)	−6.1 (21.0)	−0.6 (30.9)	3.0 (37.4)	5.6 (42.1)	6.0 (42.8)	−1.1 (30.0)	−10.0 (14.0)	−14.5 (5.9)	−18.5 (−1.3)	−21.0 (−5.8)
Average precipitation mm (inches)	27.1 (1.07)	20.4 (0.80)	17.5 (0.69)	26.3 (1.04)	34.2 (1.35)	43.3 (1.70)	30.2 (1.19)	25.1 (0.99)	22.0 (0.87)	22.0 (0.87)	30.2 (1.19)	31.7 (1.25)	330 (13.01)
Average rainfall mm (inches)	8.7 (0.34)	11.1 (0.44)	14.0 (0.55)	26.2 (1.03)	34.2 (1.35)	43.3 (1.70)	30.2 (1.19)	25.1 (0.99)	22.0 (0.87)	21.9 (0.86)	19.0 (0.75)	9.4 (0.37)	265.1 (10.44)
Average snowfall cm (inches)	18.4 (7.2)	9.3 (3.7)	3.5 (1.4)	0.1 (0.0)	0 (0)	0 (0)	0 (0)	0 (0)	0 (0)	0.2 (0.1)	11.2 (4.4)	22.2 (8.7)	64.9 (25.5)
Average precipitation days (≥ 0.2 mm (0.0079 in))	9.9	7.0	7.8	8.4	10.4	10.2	7.6	6.5	6.2	6.8	10.9	9.4	101.1
Average rainy days	4.4	4.9	6.8	8.4	10.4	10.2	7.6	6.5	6.2	6.8	9.0	3.8	85
Average snowy days (≥ 0.2 cm (0.079 in))	6.1	2.4	1.3	0.1	0	0	0	0	0	0.1	2.4	6.2	18.6
Source: Environment Canada

== See also ==
- Steamboats of Lake Okanagan
