= Penticton Aquatic Club =

Boathouse in Penticton, British Columbia

Coordinates: 49.5026°N 119.5973°W

The Penticton Aquatic Club was a boathouse, social centre, and clubhouse for aquatic activities in Penticton, British Columbia. Built in 1913 at the foot of Winnipeg Street by Okanagan Lake, it became an important part of Penticton summer life. It was perhaps best known for its annual Aquatic Regatta Day, which featured a variety of activities including a war canoe race. The building was demolished in 1952. The Club's four war canoes are undergoing restoration: one of them is a display at the S.S. Sicamous Heritage Park.

== Role ==
After the construction of the Incola Hotel in 1912, Penticton's beaches became increasingly attractive both to locals and to summer visitors. The Aquatic Club was built by Okanagan Lake in 1913 to cater for their appetite for enjoying summer activities by and in its waters. An ancillary clubhouse was erected on the beach of Skaha Lake. A notable member of the Club was John Power, a Penticton pioneer and an enthusiastic contributor to his community: he served as the Club's president, and organized many of its successful regattas.

=== Events ===
During the year, the Aquatic Club often held teas and dances. In particular, the lawn tennis club held dances at the Aquatic Club in the summer. These were open to public for 50 cents admission, including refreshments and live music played by club members. As one member recounts, “Without doubt they enjoyed themselves fox-trotting, doing the Charleston or waltzing as the cool evening air wafted in from the lake.”

The Aquatic Club’s most celebrated event was the annual Aquatic Regatta Day in July. The morning featured diving and swimming contests for boys and girls in different age groups, followed by diving, swimming, canoeing, sailing, tub and barrel racing, motor boat racing, and canoe jousting competitions for teens and adults in the afternoon. Other activities included a bathing beauty parade, decorated boat parade, surf boarding, and aquatic clown contests for men and women. However, the highlight of day was the War Canoe race. 15 people teams from Penticton, Kelowna, Summerland, and Peachland raced down Okanagan Lake, paddling in a 30-foot war canoe for about one kilometre to compete for the Robinson Cup. A band performed at 7:30pm, followed by dancing and live music from 9pm to morning.

== Decline ==
Decline of the Aquatic Centre began during World War I, when the regatta was put on hiatus as men left to join the troops. Activities recommenced on their return, but became less regular and only endured for a brief period of time. The Club declined further with World War II. The building became headquarters for British Columbia’s inaugural Teen Town, a program started in 1946 in Penticton by parents who wanted teens to be more community-minded. The building was demolished in 1952. Boat racing activities moved to Skaha Lake and swimming and diving moved to the new Community Centre.

== Modern times ==
The four war canoes used for the regatta were paraded during Peachland’s centennial celebrations in 2009. In 2010, the Penticton Museum decided to restore the canoes and bring back the races. Penticton held its first Annual Steamfest Regatta and Antique Boat Show on September 21, 2014 to pay tribute to the aquatic days of the 1900s and fundraise for the restoration of the four original war canoes. Activities over the weekend included war canoe races, an antique boat show, kayak, canoe, outrigger and dragon boat races, a bathing suit competition, a decorated boat competition, and tub racing. As well, the Okanagan Antique and Classic Boat Society featured a fleet of restored motor craft at the Lakeside Hotel marina.

== See also ==
- Incola Hotel
- Penticton
