= List of historic places in the Okanagan-Similkameen Regional District =

The following list includes all of the Canadian Register of Historic Places listings in Okanagan-Similkameen Regional District, British Columbia.

Name	Address	Coordinates	Government recognition (CRHP №)	Wikidata ID	Image
Similkameen Spirit Trail National Historic Site of Canada	Upper Similkameen River Valley / Vallee de la Upper Similkameen; Hedley, British Columbia BC	49°24′08″N 120°15′25″W	Federal (14552)		Upload Photo
Grist Mill at Keremeos	Upper Bench Road; Keremeos BC	49°12′50″N 119°48′29″W	British Columbia (1674)		
Michael Keogan's Chimney	Alba Road; Keremeos BC	49°19′54″N 119°34′07″W	Keremeos municipality (20348)		Upload Photo
Granite Creek Town Site and Cemetery	Granite Street, SE of Coalmont; Regional District of Okanagan-Similkameen BC	49°30′19″N 120°40′52″W	Regional District of Okanagan-Similkameen municipality (20165)		Upload Photo
Bike Barn	300 Westminster Avenue West; Penticton BC	49°29′57″N 119°35′53″W	Penticton municipality (6782)		
Fairview Cemetery	1136 Fairview Road; Penticton BC	49°29′12″N 119°35′28″W	Penticton municipality (6795)		
Gibson House	112 Eckhardt Avenue West; Penticton BC	49°29′33″N 119°35′28″W	Penticton municipality (6775)		
Gyro Bandshell	24 Lakeshore Drive West; Penticton BC	49°30′07″N 119°35′42″W	Penticton municipality (6798)		
Kettle Valley Railway Station	216 Hastings Avenue; Penticton BC	49°29′04″N 119°35′38″W	Penticton municipality (6783)		Upload Photo
Leir House	220 Manor Park Avenue; Penticton BC	49°29′04″N 119°35′02″W	Penticton municipality (6774)		Upload Photo
Munson Mountain	650 Lower Bench Road; Penticton BC	49°30′56″N 119°34′26″W	Penticton municipality (6800)		More images
Munson/Cleland Property	10 Upper Bench Road South; Penticton BC	49°30′12″N 119°33′43″W	Penticton municipality (6796)		Upload Photo
Penticton High School	158 Main Street; Penticton BC	49°29′32″N 119°35′13″W	Penticton municipality (6776)		Upload Photo
Penticton Post Office	301 Main Street; Penticton BC	49°29′56″N 119°35′33″W	Penticton municipality (6780)		
Penticton Provincial Courthouse	100 Main Street; Penticton BC	49°30′06″N 119°35′38″W	Penticton municipality (6799)		
Riordan House	689 Winnipeg Street; Penticton BC	49°29′33″N 119°35′35″W	Penticton municipality (6779)		
S.S. Naramata	1099 Lakeshore Drive West; Penticton BC	49°30′08″N 119°36′43″W	British Columbia (6186)		
S.S. Sicamous	1075 Lakeshore Drive West; Penticton BC	49°30′07″N 119°36′40″W	Penticton municipality (6777)		More images
Warren House	434 Lakeshore Drive West; Penticton BC	49°30′05″N 119°36′00″W	Penticton municipality (6797)		Upload Photo
White Lodge	1425 McMillan Avenue; Penticton BC	49°30′45″N 119°33′43″W	Penticton municipality (6778)		Upload Photo
Manning Park Lodge	7500 Highway 3 Near Princeton BC	49°03′47″N 120°47′10″W	British Columbia (18053)		Upload Photo
Monument 83	Princeton BC	49°00′01″N 120°38′46″W	British Columbia (18048)		Upload Photo
Staff Residence	Highway 3 Near Princeton BC	49°03′49″N 120°47′06″W	British Columbia (18055)		Upload Photo
Windy Joe Lookout	Princeton BC	49°02′38″N 120°45′18″W	British Columbia (18052)		Upload Photo
Former Superintendent’s Residence	Summerland BC	49°33′56″N 119°39′07″W	Federal (10133)		
Sod-Roofed Cabin	4500 Landry Crescent; Summerland BC	49°34′58″N 119°38′31″W	Summerland municipality (21064)		Upload Photo
