= Columbia Plateau (ecoregion) =

Xeric shrubland ecoregion of Canada and the United States

Columbia Plateau ecoregion
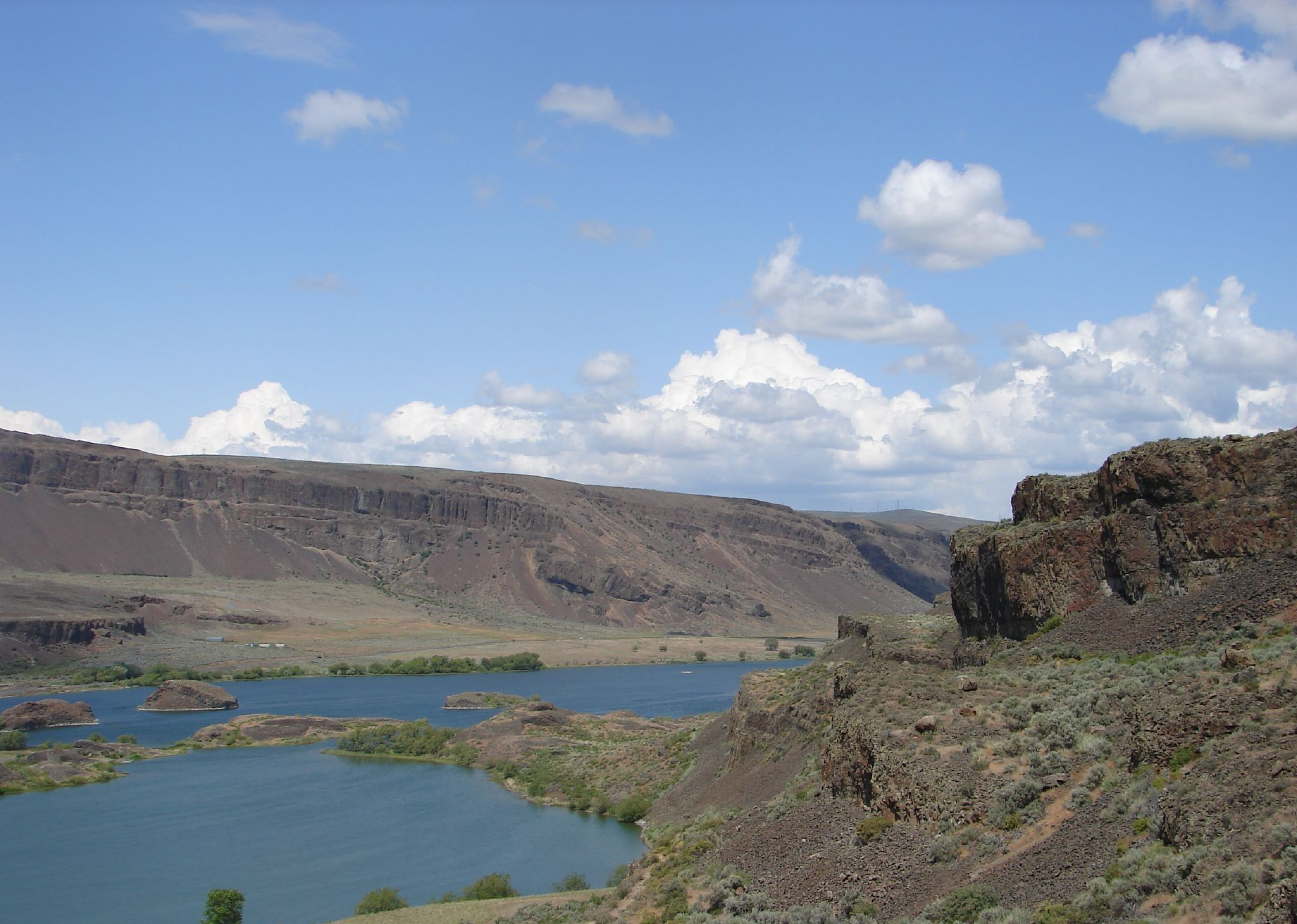
- Ice Age floods cut coulees into the basalt of the Channeled Scablands (ecoregion 10a)

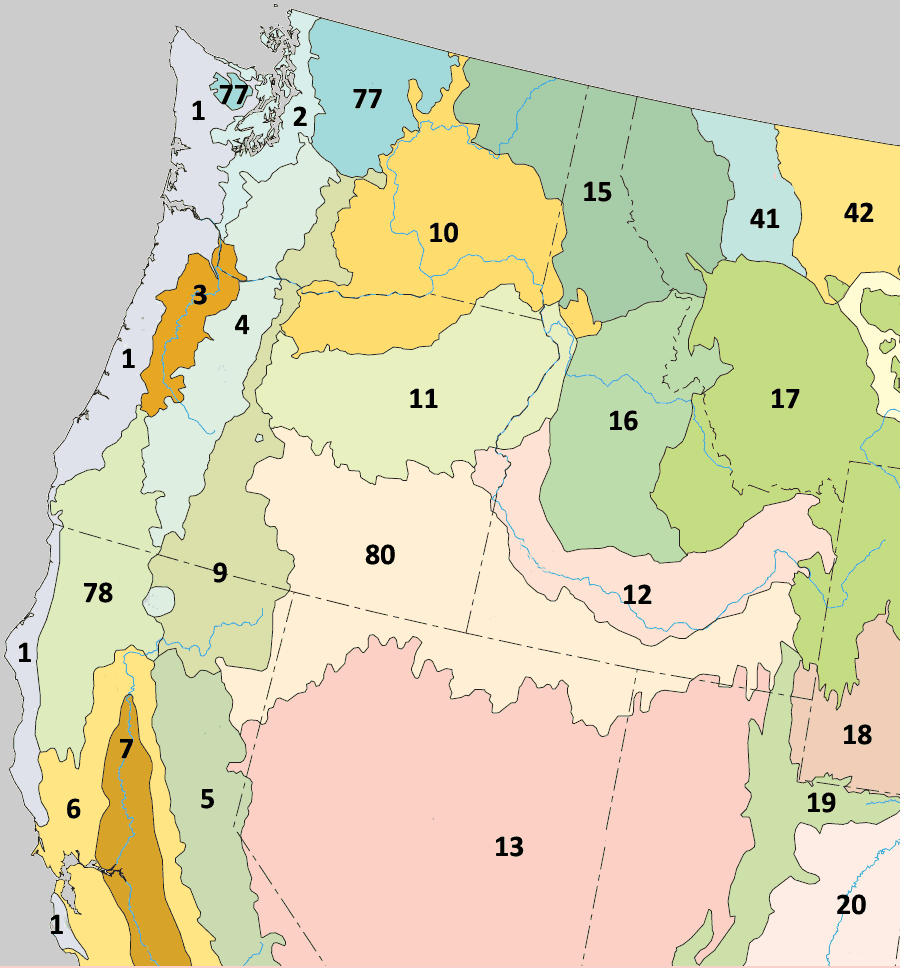
- Level III ecoregions of the Pacific Northwest. The Columbia Plateau ecoregion is marked with (10).

Ecology
- Realm: Nearctic
- Borders: List: Eastern Cascades Slopes and Foothills (9); Blue Mountains (11); Northern Rockies (15); Idaho Batholith (16); North Cascades (77)

Geography
- Countries: United States; Canada
- States/Provinces: Washington; Oregon; Idaho; British Columbia
- Coordinates: 47°N 119°W

The Columbia Plateau ecoregion is a Level III ecoregion designated by the United States Environmental Protection Agency (EPA) encompassing approximately 32,100 square miles (83,139 km^{2}) of land within the U.S. states of Washington, Oregon, and Idaho. The ecoregion extends across a wide swath of the Columbia River Basin from The Dalles, Oregon to Lewiston, Idaho to Okanogan, Washington near the Canada–U.S. border. It includes nearly 500 miles (800 km) of the Columbia River, as well as the lower reaches of major tributaries such as the Snake and Yakima rivers and the associated drainage basins.

The ecoregion is named for the Columbia Plateau, a flood basalt plateau formed by the Columbia River Basalt Group during the late Miocene and early Pliocene. The arid sagebrush steppe and grasslands of the region are flanked by moister, predominantly forested, mountainous ecoregions on all sides. The underlying basalt is up to 2 miles (3 km) thick and partially covered by thick loess deposits. Where precipitation amounts are sufficient, the deep loess soils have been extensively cultivated for wheat. Water from the Columbia River is subject to resource allocation debates involving fisheries, navigation, hydropower, recreation, and irrigation, and the Columbia Basin Project has dramatically converted much of the region to agricultural use.

The Columbia Plateau ecoregion has been subdivided into at least fourteen Level IV ecoregions, as described below.

== Level IV ecoregions ==
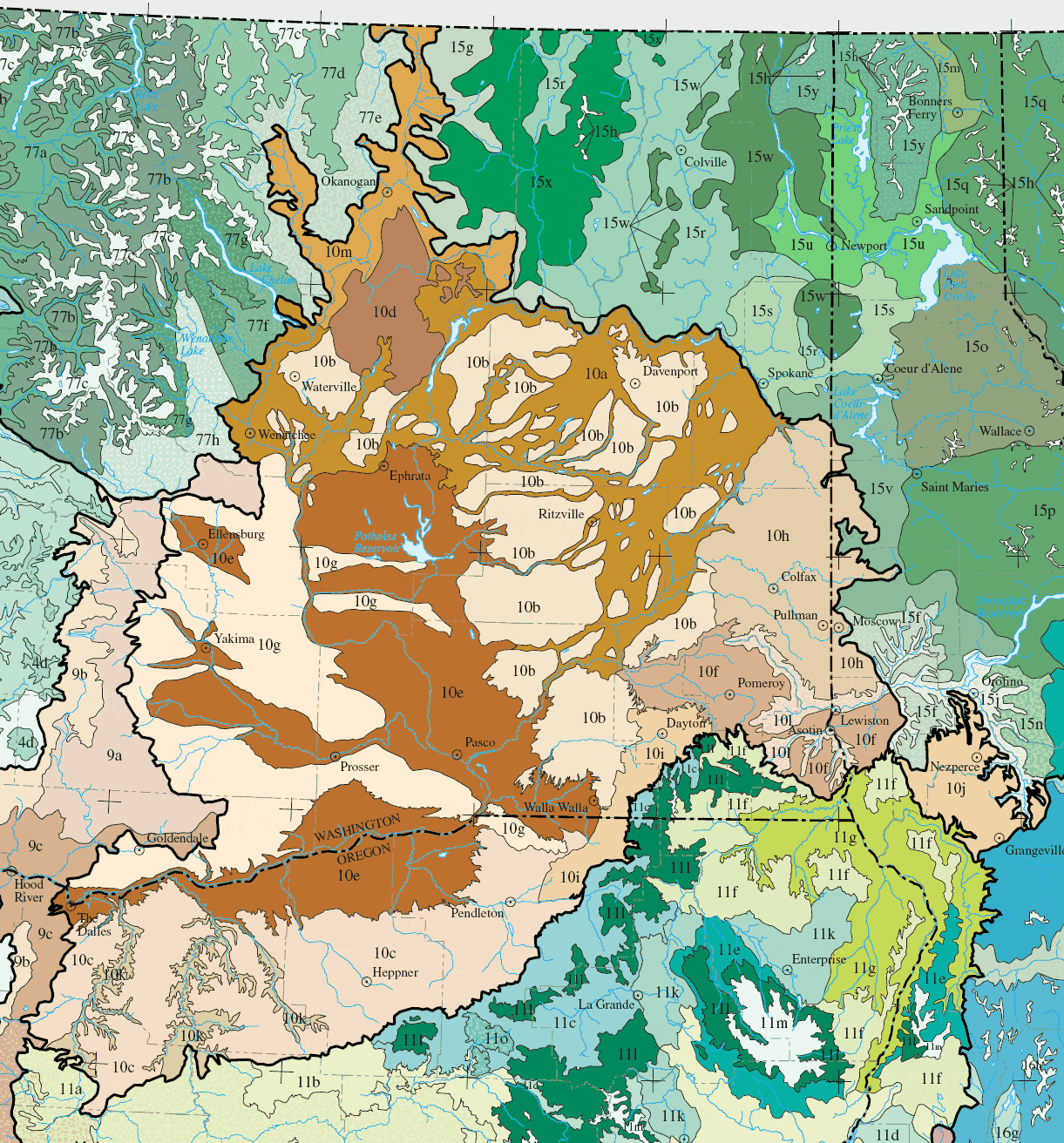
Level IV ecoregions in the Columbia Plateau.(Full map).

=== Channeled Scablands (10a) ===
The Channeled Scablands ecoregion contains the coulees and Channeled Scablands of Washington carved out by the cataclysmic Missoula floods, from Wenatchee to Spokane, including public land within the Lake Roosevelt National Recreation Area and Wenatchee National Forest.

=== Loess Islands (10b) ===
The Loess Islands ecoregion consists of large pockets of thick loess deposits surrounded by the Channeled Scablands throughout Eastern Washington, including public land within the Turnbull National Wildlife Refuge and the Juniper Dunes Wilderness.

=== Umatilla Plateau (10c) ===
The Umatilla Plateau ecoregion, named for the Umatilla who originally inhabited the area, is characterized by a nearly level to rolling, treeless plateau, underlain by basalt and veneered with loess deposits. Elevation varies from 1,000 to 3,200 feet (300 to 980 m). Glacial features such as patterned ground are common. Areas with thick loess deposits are farmed for dryland winter wheat or irrigated alfalfa and barley. Rangeland dominates more rugged areas where loess deposits are thinner or nonexistent. Mean annual precipitation is 9 to 15 inches (230 to 380 mm) and increases with elevation. In uncultivated areas, moisture levels are generally high enough to support grasslands of bluebunch wheatgrass, Sandberg bluegrass, and Idaho fescue, without associated sagebrush, which is more common in the Pleistocene Lake Basins. Stiff sagebrush may be found on very shallow soils. Alien cheatgrass covers broad areas. The region covers 3,712 square miles (9,614 km^{2}) in Eastern Oregon, including the Umatilla Indian Reservation and agricultural areas south of the Columbia River.

=== Okanogan Drift Hills (10d) ===
The Okanogan Drift Hills ecoregion is located in Douglas and Okanogan Counties, Washington, including part of the Colville Indian Reservation.

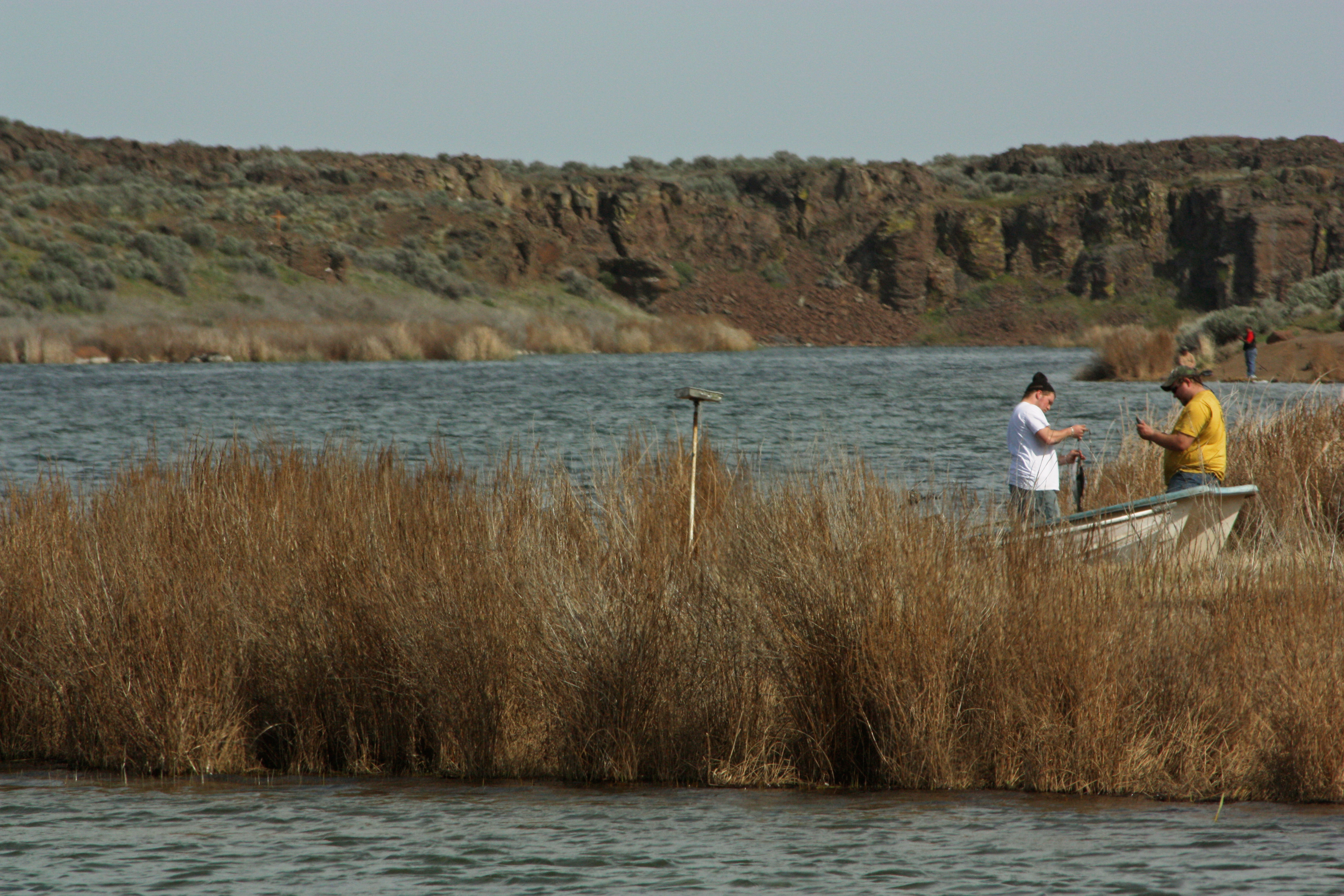
Quincy Lake, one of the Pleistocene Lake Basins, is a remnant of the temporary Pleistocene lakes that were created by flood waters from glacial Lake Missoula.

=== Pleistocene Lake Basins (10e) ===
The Pleistocene Lake Basins ecoregion is a nearly level to undulating lake plain that contained vast temporary Pleistocene lakes that were created by flood waters from glacial lakes Missoula and Columbia. In Oregon, the flood waters accumulated from the eastern entrance of the Columbia River Gorge upstream to the Wallula Gap to form ancient Lake Condon. Elevation varies from 300 to 1,200 feet (90 to 370 m). Today, the region is the driest and warmest part of the Columbia Plateau, with mean annual precipitation varying from 7 to 10 inches (180 to 250 mm). Major irrigation projects provide Columbia River water to the region, allowing the conversion of large areas into agriculture. Where present, native vegetation consists of needle-and-thread, Indian ricegrass, bluebunch wheatgrass, Sandberg bluegrass, and basin big sagebrush. Alien cheatgrass covers broad areas. The largest of the Columbia Plateau subregions, the Pleistocene Lake Basins covers 1,407 square miles (3,644 km^{2}) in Eastern Oregon and larger areas in Washington, encompassing lower elevations throughout the Mid-Columbia Basin. It includes part of the Yakama Indian Reservation, as well as public lands within the Umatilla, Cold Springs, McNary, and Columbia national wildlife refuges, the Hanford Nuclear Site, and the Hanford Reach National Monument.

=== Dissected Loess Uplands (10f) ===
The Dissected Loess Uplands ecoregion consists of disjunct rolling hills and flat plateau remnants cut by the Lower Snake and Clearwater Canyons. Elevation varies from 1,500 to 3,600 feet (460 to 1,100 m). Pure grasslands dominate lower elevations, with bluebunch wheatgrass, Idaho fescue, and Sandberg bluegrass. Mountain brush grows on north facing slopes and higher, moister sites, with snowberry and wild rose. Livestock grazing and farming have eliminated much of the original plant cover. Nevertheless, the Dissected Loess Uplands is not as suited to farming as neighboring regions because it has thinner soils. The Dissected Loess Uplands covers 224 square miles (580 km^{2}) in western Idaho and larger areas in southeastern Washington, south of the Snake River between Dayton and Lewiston, including part of the Nez Perce Indian Reservation.

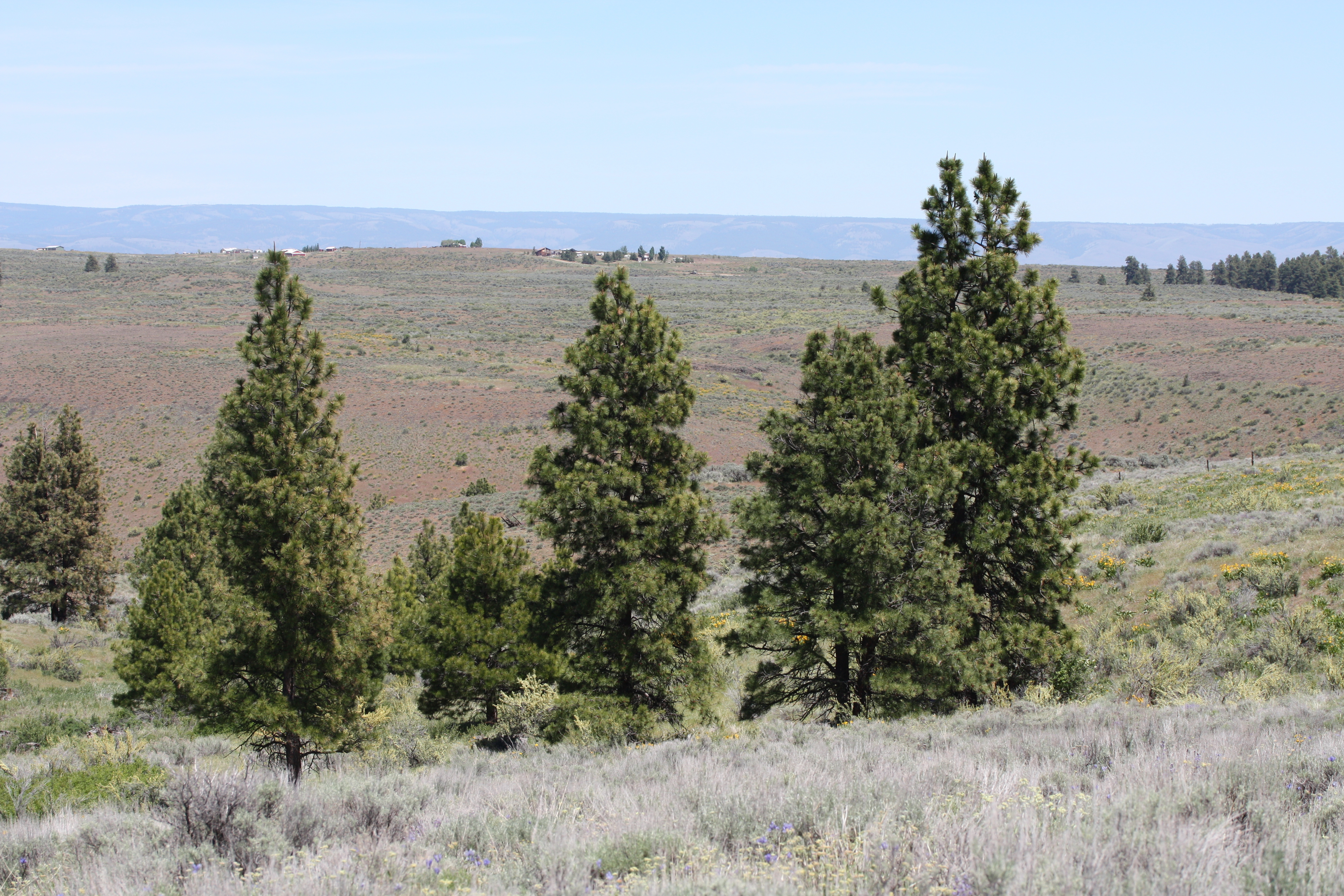
Arrowleaf Balsamroot (Balsamorhiza sagittata), Antelope Bitterbrush (Purshia tridentata) and scattered Ponderosa Pine grow in the Yakima Folds (ecoregion 10g)

=== Yakima Folds (10g) ===
The Yakima Folds ecoregion, named for the Yakama people who originally inhabited the area, consists of unforested anticlinal ridges composed of layer upon layer of basalt many thousands of feet thick. Elevation varies from 1,000 to 3,500 feet (300 to 1070 m). Loess blankets the south-facing slopes and supports dryland wheat farming. Steep, rocky north-facing slopes are commonly used for livestock grazing. The region receives an average of 10 to 12 inches (250 to 300 mm) of rain per year. Sagebrush and bunchgrass associations dominate plant assemblages outside of heavily farmed or grazed areas, with needle-and-thread, bluebunch wheatgrass, Sandberg bluegrass, Wyoming big sagebrush, and basin big sagebrush. Alien cheatgrass covers broad areas. The region covers 109 square miles (282 km^{2}) in Oregon and much larger areas in Washington, extending from the Horse Heaven Hills in the south to the Kittitas Valley in the north, including parts of Yakama Indian Reservation, Hanford Reach National Monument, Wenas Wildlife Area, and the Yakima Training Center.

=== Palouse Hills (10h) ===
The Palouse Hills ecoregion contains the unglaciated Western foothills of the Northern Rocky Mountains known as the Palouse Hills, after the Palouse River that runs through them and the Palus tribe who originally inhabited the area. Elevation varies from 2,500 to 3,000 feet (760 to 910 m). Mountain-fed perennial streams occur, and intermittent, loess-bottomed streams rise within the region. The soils are rich in organic matter and very productive, supporting extensive wheat farming, but they are easily eroded. Dry stream channels may be tilled. The region supports fescue-wheatgrass, fescue-snowberry, and fescue-hawthorn associations, as well as ponderosa pine savanna and open ponderosa pine and Douglas-fir forests. The region covers 453 square miles (1,173 km^{2}) along the Idaho border, including parts of the St. Joe National Forest and the Coeur d'Alene Indian Reservation, and larger areas in Whitman and Spokane Counties, Washington.

=== Deep Loess Foothills (10i) ===
The Deep Loess Foothills ecoregion contains the lower elevation, northwest-facing slopes of the eastern Blue Mountains, with perennial streams fed by snow melt from the adjacent high mountains. Elevation varies from 1,500 to 3,000 feet (460 to 910 m). Moisture levels are high enough to support grasslands of Idaho fescue, Sandberg bluegrass, and bluebunch wheatgrass, but the region is dominated by non-irrigated winter wheat, barley, alfalfa, and green pea farming on the highly productive, loess-rich soils. The region covers 146 square miles (378 km^{2}) in Oregon and a contiguous area in Washington, in a narrow band from Pendleton to Dayton, including part of the Umatilla Indian Reservation.

=== Nez Perce Prairie (10j) ===
The Nez Perce Prairie is a loess-covered plateau named after the Nez Perce tribe who originally inhabited the area and whose reservation is located here today. It is higher, cooler, less hilly, and has shallower soils than the Palouse Hills. Elevation varies from 2,000 to 4,100 feet (600 to 1250 m), with buttes up to 5,700 feet (1,700 m). Idaho fescue and bluebunch wheatgrass are native, with Douglas-fir and ponderosa pine on north-facing slopes. Cropland is now extensive and grows wheat, barley, peas, and hay. The headwaters of many perennial streams are impacted by agricultural land use, negatively impacting the water quality of downstream canyon reaches. The region covers 725 square miles (1,878 km^{2}) in Idaho, on the Nez Perce Indian Reservation and surrounding areas.

=== Deschutes/John Day Canyons (10k) ===
The Deschutes/John Day Canyons ecoregion consists of very steep to precipitous canyonlands containing the Deschutes and John Day Rivers. Deeply cut into the basalt, the canyons fragment a lightly populated portion of the Umatilla Plateau. Canyon depths up to 2,000 feet (600 m) create drier conditions than on the plateau above. Sparse bunchgrasses, Wyoming big sagebrush, and cheatgrass grow on the rocky, colluvial soil. Riparian vegetation in narrow reaches is often limited to a band of white alder at the water line, with some mockorange, western clematis, and chokecherry; broader floodplains and gravel bars are dominated by introduced species, such as reed canarygrass, sweetclover, and teasel. The rivers support chinook salmon and steelhead runs. The region covers 674 square miles (1,746 km^{2}) in Oregon, along the lower reaches of the Deschutes and John Day rivers and their tributaries.

=== Lower Snake and Clearwater Canyons (10l) ===
The Lower Snake and Clearwater Canyons ecoregion consists of deep canyons cut through the basalts of the Columbia Plateau by the Snake and Clearwater Rivers. Canyon depths exceed 1,400 feet (430 m) and create drier conditions than in neighboring regions; mean annual precipitation is only 12 to 25 inches (300 to 640 mm). Outside of towns and transportation corridors, the canyons provide good habitat for bighorn sheep and game birds, with grasslands of bluebunch wheatgrass, Idaho fescue, bluegrass, and Wyoming big sagebrush. The region covers 80 square miles (207 km^{2}) in Idaho and slightly larger areas in Washington, along the lower reaches of the Snake and Clearwater rivers and their tributaries.

=== Okanogan Valley (10m) ===
The Okanogan Valley ecoregion is located along the lower reaches of the Okanogan and Methow Rivers and their tributaries in northeastern Washington, including land managed by the Okanogan–Wenatchee National Forest. This ecoregion extends northward into the southern Okanagan Valley of British Columbia up to the southern shores of Skaha Lake. This includes towns such as Osoyoos, Oliver, and Okanagan Falls.

=== Umatilla Dissected Uplands (10n) ===
The Umatilla Dissected Uplands ecoregion consists of dissected, hilly uplands with a terrace-like appearance, where the dry grasslands of the Columbia Plateau meet the forested Blue Mountains ecoregion. Slopes are rolling to very steep. Elevation varies from 1,600 to 4,400 feet (490 to 1,340 m). The hills and uplands are covered with Idaho fescue, bluebunch wheatgrass, and Sandberg bluegrass. Near the Blue Mountains, some north-facing slopes have Douglas-fir and ponderosa pine, with snowberry, pinegrass, and ninebark. The region is mostly used as rangeland because it lacks the thick, arable loess deposits that cover the agricultural Umatilla Plateau. Scablands, composed of arrays of earth mounds surrounded by rock polygons, are relics of Pleistocene glacial periods. The region covers 743 square miles (1,924 km^{2}) in Eastern Oregon, in a narrow band along the northern edge of the Umatilla National Forest, mostly outside the national forest's boundaries.

== See also ==
- Ecoregions defined by the EPA and the Commission for Environmental Cooperation:
  - List of ecoregions in North America (CEC)
  - List of ecoregions in the United States (EPA)
  - List of ecoregions in Oregon
  - List of ecoregions in Idaho
  - List of ecoregions in Washington
- The conservation group World Wildlife Fund maintains an alternate classification system:
  - List of ecoregions (WWF)
  - List of ecoregions in the United States (WWF)
