= Kaleden =

- Location of Kaleden Kaleden (Canada)
- Coordinates: 49°23′59″N 119°36′04″W
- Country: Canada
- Province: British Columbia
- Region: Okanagan
- Regional district: Okanagan-Similkameen

Area
  - Total: 4.31 km^{2} (1.66 sq mi)

Population (2021)
  - Total: 1,186
  - Density: 275/km^{2} (713/sq mi)
- Area codes: 250, 778
- Highways: Highway 97
- Website: Official website

Kaleden (/kəˈliːdən/) is an unincorporated community about midway along the western shore of Skaha Lake in the Okanagan region of south central British Columbia. Adjacent to BC Highway 97, the locality is by road about 13 kilometres (8 mi) south of Penticton.

== Agriculture ==
As early as 1875, the cattle of Thomas (Tom) Ellis grazed on the Kaleden hillside. The first Caucasian settler (Shoemaker) farmed on what became the Junction Ranch, which stretched southwest from the BC Highway 3A junction. Richard Hynds, who pre-empted these 130 hectares (320 acres) in 1891, operated a stopping place for a number of years at the White Lake Rd junction. In 1899, he sold the property to Basel Lawrence, who later pre-empted the adjacent 130 hectares (320 acres) to the east. Dugald Gillespie, who pre-empted the adjacent land to the south in 1895, planted a small orchard of mixed fruits. In 1900, he developed the first irrigation system in the district, by building a small dam at the foot of Marron Lake. He also operated a freighting business that primarily served the mining communities to the west and south. To the north in the Banbury Green/Point area, R. J. Cheeseman pre-empted in 1895, Cheeseman Point being the name for many years. Later purchaser Douglas Dewar called his holdings Banbury.

During 1906–1909, under his own name and those of relatives and friends, James (Jim) Ritchie purchased 1,200 hectares (3,000 acres) which included the whole present settlement. In 1908, the Kaleden Development Company (KDC), his syndicate, began installing an irrigation system. Water flowed along pipes and ditches from a diversion dam on Shatford Creek to west of the junction on Marron Creek, where a concrete intake was built. Various upgrades were made over the following years and after the Kaleden Irrigation District took over the water supply.

In 1910, Jim Harrison, Harry Corbitt, and A.S. Hatfield established a partnership to plant and initially nurture about 81 hectares (200 acres). Around 27,000 trees were planted in the first year, largely for private owners. In 1911, H.H. Whitaker performed this task on parts of the unsold KDC land. The 1913 recession and the outbreak of World War I in 1914 suspended new planting.

In 1913, the first commercial crop was picked. The returns from these apricots did not cover the shipping and packing costs. In 1915 and 1916, profits were realized when Western Canners took most of the crop. In 1917, the first fruit packing house was built. By 1918, Kaleden had become the largest producer of apricots in the valley. The "Kaleden Cots", a form of apricot tree producing golden yellow apricots with red cheeks, were first propagated in Kaleden from trees purchased by Frank Harrison in 1910.

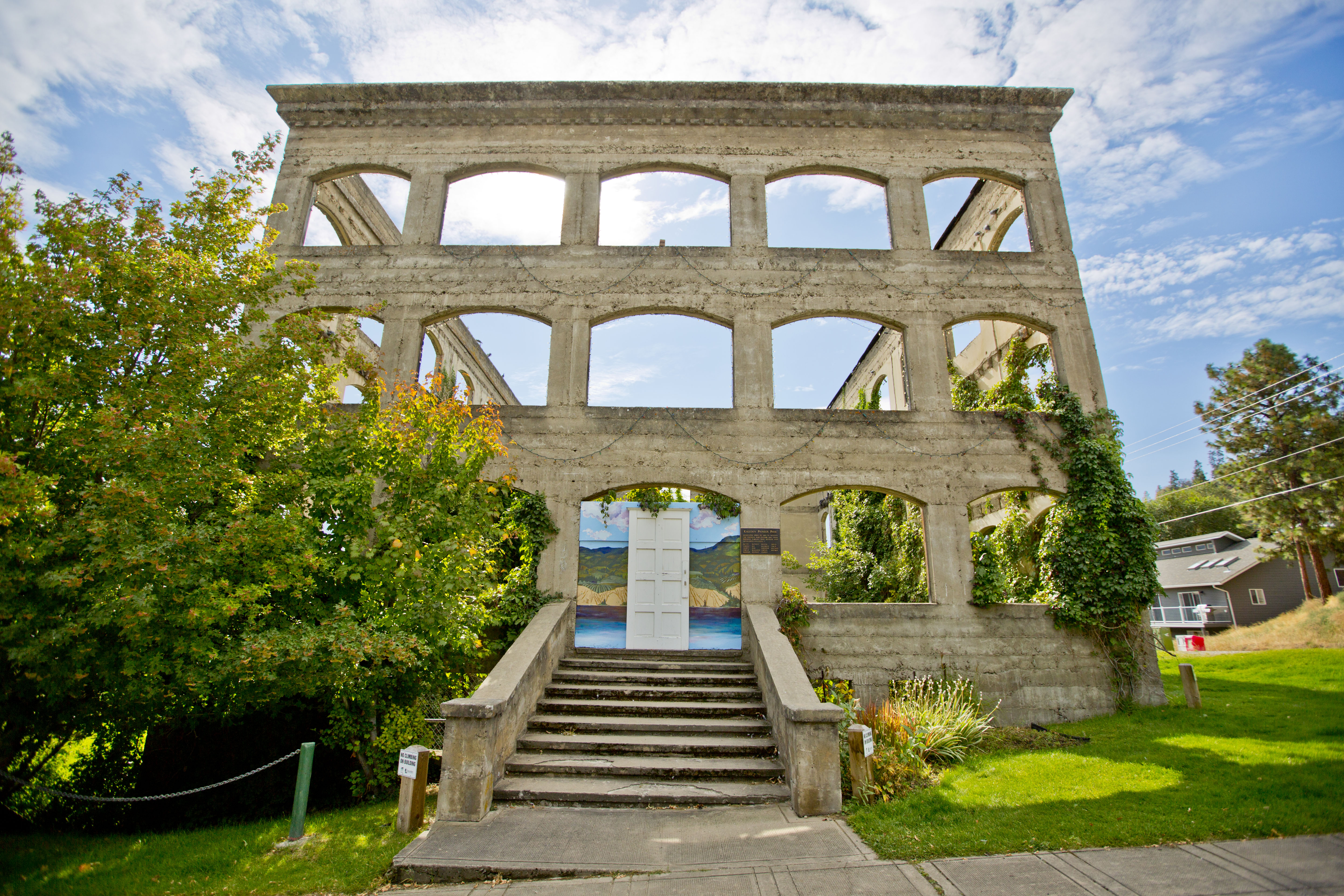
Former hotel (entrance), Kaleden, 2018

Several English lenders had funded the KDC. By 1912, Lord de Vesci had invested about $150,000. The enormous irrigation construction costs had created liquidity problems. Consequently, the KDC was unable to meet its immediate obligations, and the war had cut off further financing. Although the orchards held by private owners survived, the 100 hectares (250 acres) of KDC ones were abandoned to die. In 1919, the bankrupt company was wound up. By 1921, about 81 hectares (200 acres) were in private hands. The Kaleden Estates (KE) syndicate, headed by Sir William Hutcheson Poë and including Lord de Vesci, acquired the remaining 1,100 hectares (2,800 acres). In 1929, replanting of the abandoned orchards began. During 1921–1956, the KE sold the land for ranches and orchards, roads, and a cemetery, or gifted land to the province or the Kaleden Irrigation District to settle property taxes.

In 1922, the Penticton Co-operative Growers bought the packing house, but the growers formed the Kaleden Co-Operative Growers instead the next year. In 1932, a modern cold storage plant adjacent to the railway replaced the old inadequate packing house.

Over time, the produce has largely evolved from tree fruit to vineyards.

== Waterway and roads ==
During the earlier years, Skaha Lake ferries were critical to transportation.

Passing along the upper level were the W.J. Snodgrass stage in the 1890s and the McDougall & Hine one in the early 1900s, when Warwick Arnott bought out McDougall. In 1910, new highway construction descended from the north (present Pineview Dr), rejoining the old highway (present Old Kaleden Rd) near Okanagan Falls. From 1911, the Arnott & Hine stage followed this road into the lakeshore townsite. Bliss Carman recounts the route in the poem "Kaleden Road". After 1920, Seaman Hatfield began a passenger and mail run via the White Lake area. In 1931, Greyhound Canada bought the stage franchise that included the settlement.

Around 1990, the highway north was widened to four lanes.

BC Transit provides daily services.

== Name origin ==
In spring 1909, a contest was held to name the new subdivision. Rev. Walter Russel, who submitted the winning entry, won one of the lots. The name combined the Greek word "kalos" (beautiful) and the biblical garden.

== Earlier community ==
While the townsite was being surveyed during summer and fall 1909, each $50 deposit lodged by a buyer for a 2-hectare (5-acre) lot was listed chronologically. Ranking on the list determined priority in choosing a specific property. After the November sale day, the KDC sold lots in a more conventional manner. At the time, the lakeshore commercial centre comprised a log cabin and barn built years earlier, a two-storey general store, blacksmith shop, some residences, and numerous tents. In 1910, D.D. Lapsley purchased the store from Ritchie and Hatfield. That year, Miss Olga Watson was the inaugural teacher at the school that was held in the upstairs part of the store. A new cookhouse building erected in 1910 served workers until 1912. A.S. Hatfield, who was the inaugural postmaster 1910–1920, operated from a small building about 23 metres (25 yd) north of the 1912 store. In 1912, a new two-room school opened on the benches. The Kaleden Baptist Church, erected in 1913, is now called the Kaleden Community Church.

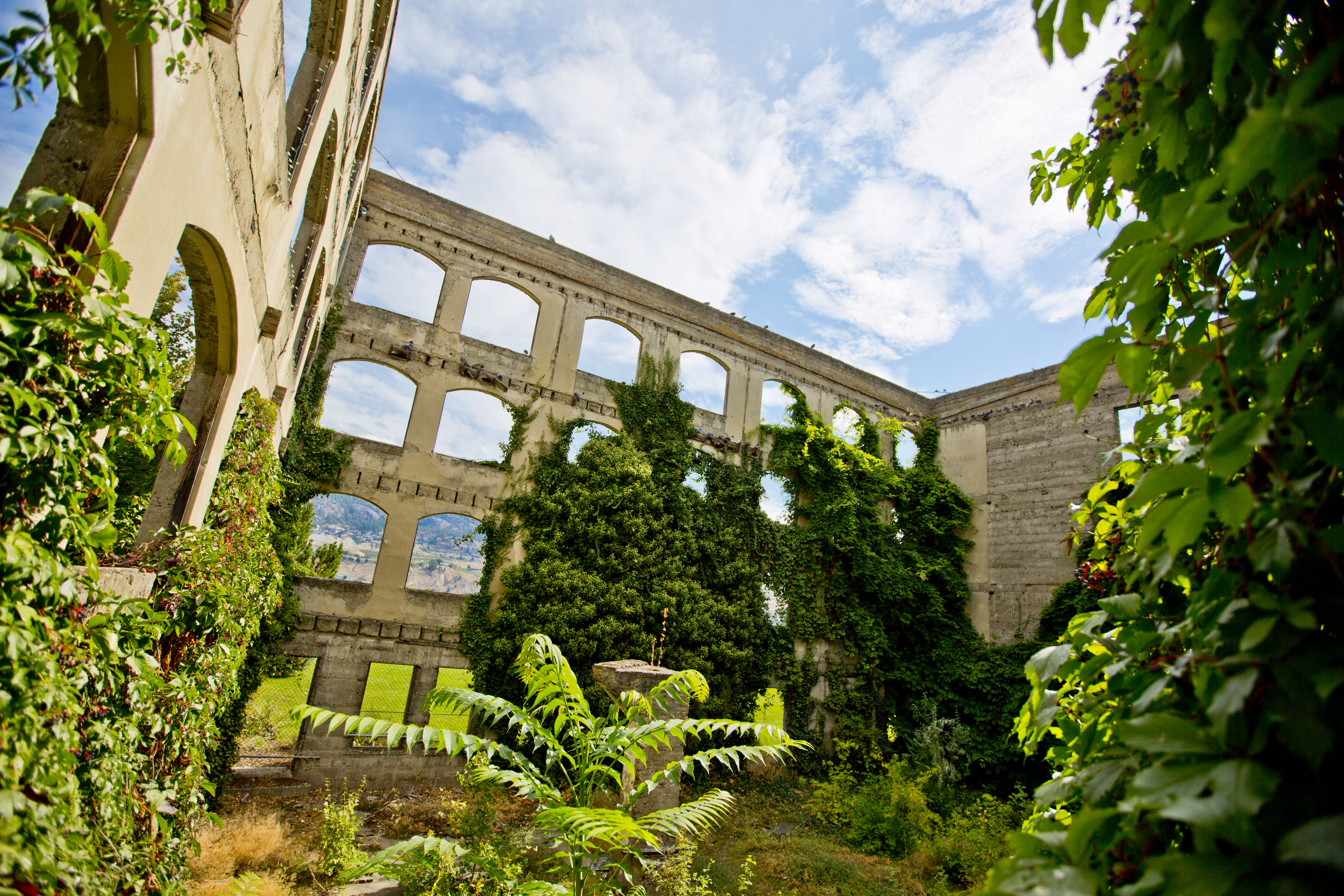
Former hotel (interior), Kaleden, 2018

In the townsite plans, land was reserved for a hotel, a larger store, a bank, and other public buildings. In fall 1911, hotel construction began. Expensively modern for the era, the concrete structure comprised 26 rooms, each with sleeping porch and bath. An upscale dining room catered to guests, and a downmarket one served the orchard workers. A private hydro plant supplied electricity. Operating for about two and a half years, the hotel closed temporarily when war broke out but never reopened. Facing dim prospects, the furniture and fittings were sold. In 1912, Lapsley moved the general store into new larger premises beside the hotel, but falling demand led to closure in 1916. The store reopened in 1923 for a couple of years.

In 1949, the community hall was built while the interior was gradually finished over the next decade.

In 1933, the school became a superior one and Grade 10 was added the next year. In 1936, the new school opened at the present location. In 1966, a new gym and a library were added. In 1976, two classrooms were added. In 1994, the present school building opened.

== Railway ==
In August 1931, the line connecting Penticton and Okanagan Falls (via Kaleden) opened, eliminating the barge service between those two points. In 1979, the tracks south of Okanagan Falls were lifted. In 1989, the last train passed through Kaleden. That year, all that remained of the Kettle Valley Railway was abandoned.

The rail bed is now a rail trail. However, residential development has absorbed parts in Kaleden, necessitating detours to local streets.

Census population: Kaleden
Year	Pop.	±%
1951	269	—
1956	299	+11.2%
1961	350	+17.1%
1966	426	+21.7%
1971	640	+50.2%
1976	789	+23.3%
1981		—
1986	1,000	—
1991	1,118	+11.8%
1996	1,229	+9.9%
2001	1,269	+3.3%
2006	1,289	+1.6%
2011	1,224	−5.0%
2016	1,203	−1.7%
2021	1,186	−1.4%
Source: Statistics Canada

== Crime ==
In June 1948, a local orchardist murdered his family, before taking his own life.

In August 1958, a female murder victim was found in a fruit picker cabin near Kaleden. A suspect stopped for questioning shot an RCMP officer three times. A search plane pursuing possible sightings of the fugitive crashed into a mountainside, killing all three RCMP officers on board. The fugitive (who was not the murderer) and the actual murderer were both committed to mental institutions.

== Later community ==
Kaleden Elementary provides K to Grade 5 education for approximately 100 students. Other services include a library branch, general store/post office, volunteer fire department, and community church.

The two local parks are Kaleden Hotel Park and Pioneer Park, which has a public beach, boat launch and BBQ area. Across the street from the former hotel, the lakeshore building has been a general store, candy making business, garage, restaurant, and private living quarters. The latest iteration, called the 1912 Restaurant, appears to have permanently closed in the mid-2010s.

Tourism accommodation includes Ponderosa Point resort and Banbury Green RV & Camping Resort.

The Dominion Radio Astrophysical Observatory lies to the southwest.

== Notable people ==
- Bud Riley (1925–2012), football coach, was a resident from 1987.
