= Christie Memorial Park =

Former provincial park of British Columbia, Canada

- Location within British Columbia
- Interactive map of Christie Memorial Park
- Location: Okanagan Falls, British Columbia
- Coordinates: 49°21′N 119°34′W
- Area: 3 hectares (7.4 acres)
- Created: 1965
- Closed: 2013
- Status: Defunct

Christie Memorial Park (formerly Christie Memorial Provincial Park) was a provincial park in British Columbia, Canada, located in the town of Okanagan Falls at the south end of Skaha Lake.

The park was established on October 5, 1965, in remembrance of RCAF Pilot Officer Robert G. Christie, DFM. Christie was serving as a Navigator (flight officer) with No. 97 Squadron RAF when he was killed in action September 23, 1943. As the only serviceman from Okanagan Falls killed in action during World War II, this Provincial Park was named after him. He is buried at Rheinberg War Cemetery, Kamp-Lintfort, Nordrhein-Westfal, Germany, grave 8. C. 18.

The park ceased to be managed by BC Parks in February 2013, when the province transferred ownership to the Regional District of Okanagan-Similkameen.
