= Riordan House =

Historical building in BC

Coordinates: 49°29′33″N 119°35′34″W

Riordan House is a historical house in Penticton, British Columbia, that was built and owned by hotel owner and rumored bootlegger David Riordan in the 1920s. The house is notable for its well-preserved California Craftsman design that represents the lifestyles and preferences of the early 20th century North American elite. It is also distinguished by its ownership by the Riordan family, who were prominent members of early Penticton society.

== Construction ==
The home was built in 1921 at 689 Winnipeg Street, a prominent corner lot. A local carpenter who had moved to Penticton from Halifax, Nova Scotia, Oswell Etter, who had been contracted to work on various other prominent Penticton buildings at the time, including the now defunct Incola Hotel, worked on construction of the home. The plans for the house were taken from a Los Angeles architect, Henry Wilson's, plan book, "The Bungalow Book," published in 1908, and are in the American Craftsman style. This style was popular amongst the elites of the Okanagan, and North America in general, during the early 20th century and was inspired by the Arts and Crafts movement.

== Architecture ==
The home is two and a half stories tall with a basement and includes three bedrooms and four bathrooms. There are many notable elements of the home's design that remained intact until at least 2006, according to the Penticton Register of Historic Places, including:

- The porte-cochere
- The decorative porch entrance
- The deep overhanging eaves
- Craftsman elements including the use of vertical elements which contrast with and break the horizontal planes (upper storey massing of gables, tall chimney, battered piers on the porte-cochere, and heavy porch supports reaching to the ground
- Exposed rafter ends and decorative knee braces
- Upper storey dormers
- Rich interior woodwork of Nova Scotia fir and oak
- Original built-in cupboards and window seats
- Original windows, doors, frames, and mouldings
- Original concrete wall around perimeter of the property
- Original rear garage
- Original landscaping and mature trees
- Original boiler and hot water heating system

An original stained-glass window in the living room depicts twin peacocks. There is an original built-in buffet and a coffered ceiling in the dining room along with a bay window. The original bookcases and ice box also remain intact. A typical Craftsman styled balustrade at the main entry and the original front door decorated with a "lobed quatrefoil" window remains. There is also a peculiar window between the Master bedroom closet and stairwell, and its purpose is unknown, although researchers theorize that it may have been used as a lookout to the stairs when Riordan might have conducted gambling on the second floor.

== Riordan ownership ==
The original owner of the house, David Riordan, was the owner and manager of the BC Hotel that was located on current-day Front Street in Penticton. He was also a Penticton City Council member for three terms. Riordan has been described by locals as "Penticton's most notorious Prohibition-era bootlegger" although other accounts state that Riordan's involvement in liquor smuggling was only rumored. Most accounts of Riordan's involvement in storing liquor for illegal distribution are local oral accounts, such as Eddie Brent's:

Dave Riordan was very involved; he owned the BC Hotel. It was during prohibition, I can remember the cases of White Horse Whiskey stacked up against the wall in the house. All kinds of booze, nobody seemed to drink it, but there was a lot of booze around. Beer came in barrels, one of which was out in the garage, the boys always took a bottle with them when they went to work.

It was rumored that Riordan stored smuggled liquor in the basement of the house. In 1920, Riordan plead guilty to a charge of illegally possessing alcohol. He was a prominent businessman and member of the Penticton elites. Riordan's wife, Alice Riordan, was known for hosting parties including her 1921 housewarming party and 1936 Halloween party that hosted guests from Montreal, Vancouver and Kelowna.

== Post-Riordan ownership ==
The Riordan family sold the home in the mid-1950s to Dr. William Wickett and his family, who owned the property until 1980. Throughout the 1980s the property was alternately used as a restaurant and teahouse. The building operated as a Bed & Breakfast from 1991 to 2006. In 2023, the home was listed again for $1.299 million. As of December 2024, the property was sold for a proposed restaurant and bakery venture led by Giulio Miceli, the co-owner of La Terrazza, an Italian restaurant in Vancouver, BC. The proposed business may serve French and Italian inspired cuisine in the future. As of 2021, the home is included on the Penticton Heritage Registry.
