= Skaha Bluffs =

Rock climbing area in British Columbia, Canada

Coordinates: 49.43°N 119.56°W

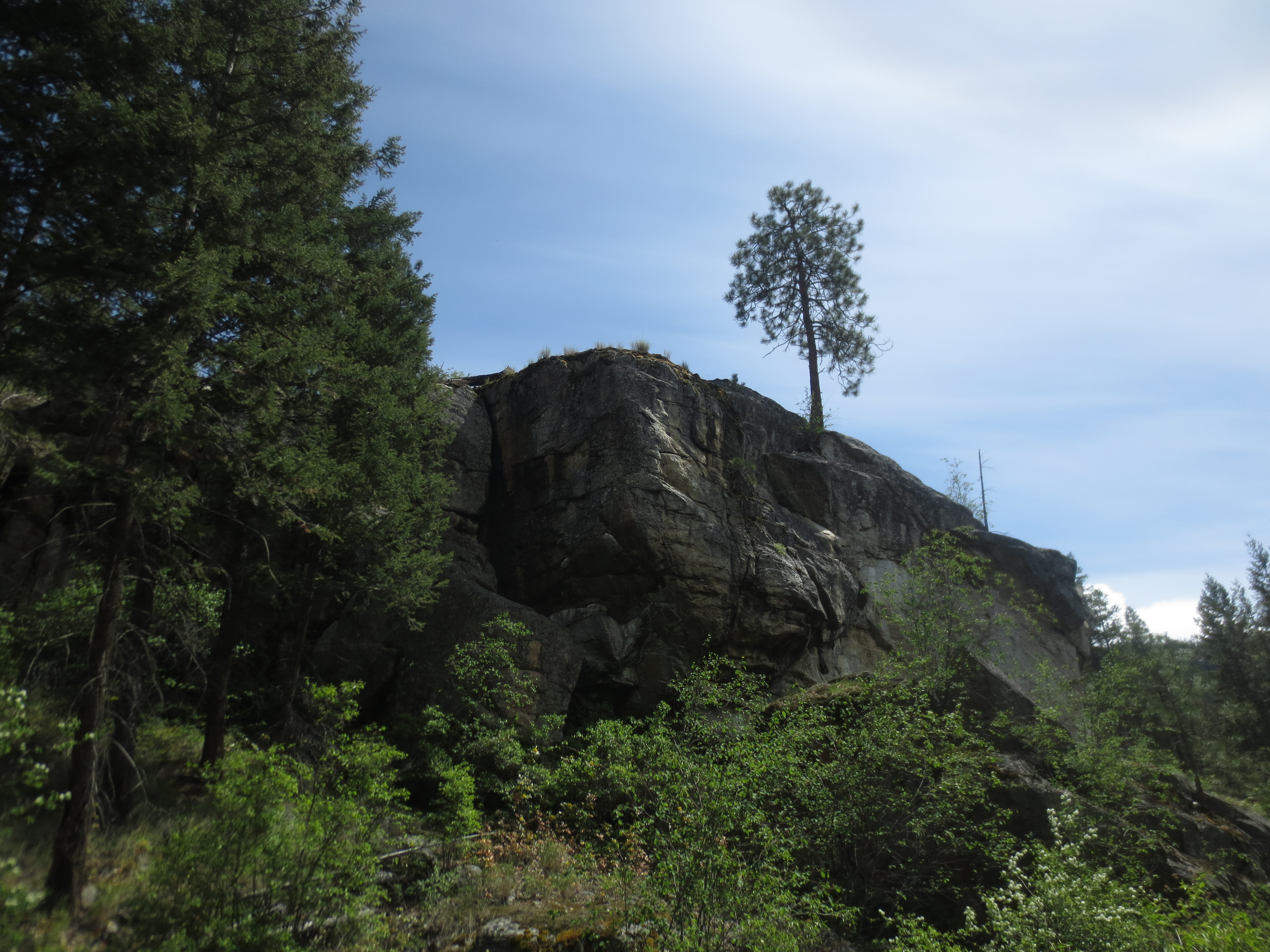
Pine on an outcrop at Skaha Bluffs

Skaha Bluffs is a rock climbing area just south of Penticton, British Columbia, Canada on a hillside above Skaha Lake. The climbing takes place in three parallel canyons. Notable climbing walls include Fortress, Red Tail, Doctors wall, The Great White Wall and The Grand Canyon. The area is mostly a sport climbing area, though traditional climbing opportunities also exist. The rocks in the area are predominantly a coarse-grained gneiss and are generally under 30 metres tall. Skaha Bluffs is a climbing area with mild weather, easy access and a number of sport climbing routes. Access is from Lakeside Road to Smythe Road up along Gillies Creek.

Permanent access to Skaha Bluffs in BC's South Okanagan has been secured. The local climbing community has worked for years to secure public access to the Bluffs. Mountain Equipment Co-op and The Land Conservancy (TLC) joined the effort in 2006. With financial support from the province of BC, the Nature Conservancy of Canada, the Climber's Access Society, and other partners, TLC closed the $5.2 million deal on January 16, 2008.

All in all, more than 740 MEC members gave over $140,000 to the campaign. MEC matched those donations up to the first $100,000 and kicked in an additional $250,000 – for total contribution of $350,000 towards the land purchase.
