= Columbia Basin =

Columbia Basin may refer to:

- Columbia Plateau, the geographic region in the Pacific Northwest commonly referred to as the Columbia Basin
- Columbia Plateau (ecoregion), an ecoregion in the U.S. states of Oregon and Washington
- Columbia River drainage basin, a drainage basin covering parts of U.S. and Canada
- Columbia River Basalt Group, a set of rock layers that underlies the Columbia Plateau, above.
