= Okanagan Falls Provincial Park =

Provincial park in British Columbia, Canada

Coordinates: 49°20′27″N 119°34′51″W

Okanagan Falls Provincial Park, now officially named sx̌ʷəx̌ʷnitkʷ Provincial Park, is a provincial park in British Columbia, Canada, located within the traditional territory of the Osoyoos Indian Band. Since time immemorial, the Osoyoos Indian Band's Okanagan ancestors have inhabited and cared for the lands and waters in their traditional territory. The park is also located within the town of Okanagan Falls, protecting the area around the waterfall of the same name, which lies below the outlet of Skaha Lake in the course of the Okanagan River.

== History ==
Okanagan Falls Provincial Park was created in 1956. In 2015, the park was renamed to reflect the traditional Okanagan place name for the area. sx̌ʷəx̌ʷnitkʷ means “little falls.” This place name signifies a connection to the historic Kettle Falls in Washington state. The step-like rapids of the outlet of the Skaha Lake were lost in 1950 when a flood control dam was built over them.

== Flora ==
The park occupies an area of two hectares. The park has deciduous trees and is an important site for the conservation of riparian vegetation. In the 1950s, non-native tree species like Chinese elm, Norway maple, red ash and Lombardy poplar were planted in the park.

== Fauna ==
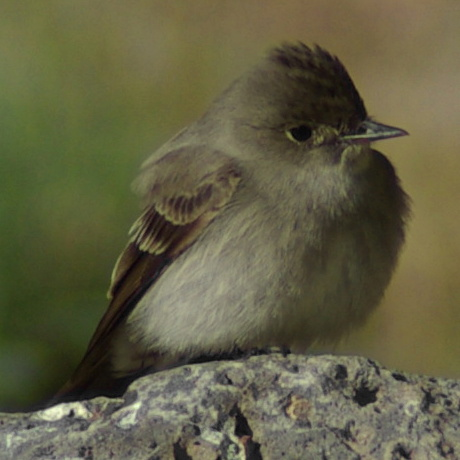
Western wood-pewee (Contopus sordidulus)

There is superb bird watching in the park. Rare species such as western wood pewees, American yellow warblers, northern orioles and least flycatchers are often spotted in the park. The park offers numerous nature-related activities such as wildlife viewing, nature study, and photography. The park also supports an astounding 18 species of bats, one of the highest concentrations in Canada.

== Activities ==
The park offers several activities, such as cycling and fishing, though for the latter permits are required. There are many trails in the park for hiking. There are also camping sites within the park.

== Events ==
sx̌ʷəx̌ʷnitkʷ park closes annually the third weekend of September for the Okanagan Nation Alliance's Salmon Feast. The event raises awareness of Okanagan history and culture, as well as the Nation's efforts to revitalise and restore sockeye salmon numbers in the Okanagan River. Everyone is welcome to attend the celebration, but the campsites are closed to the general public on this weekend.
