= Penticton =

- City
- The Corporation of the City of Penticton
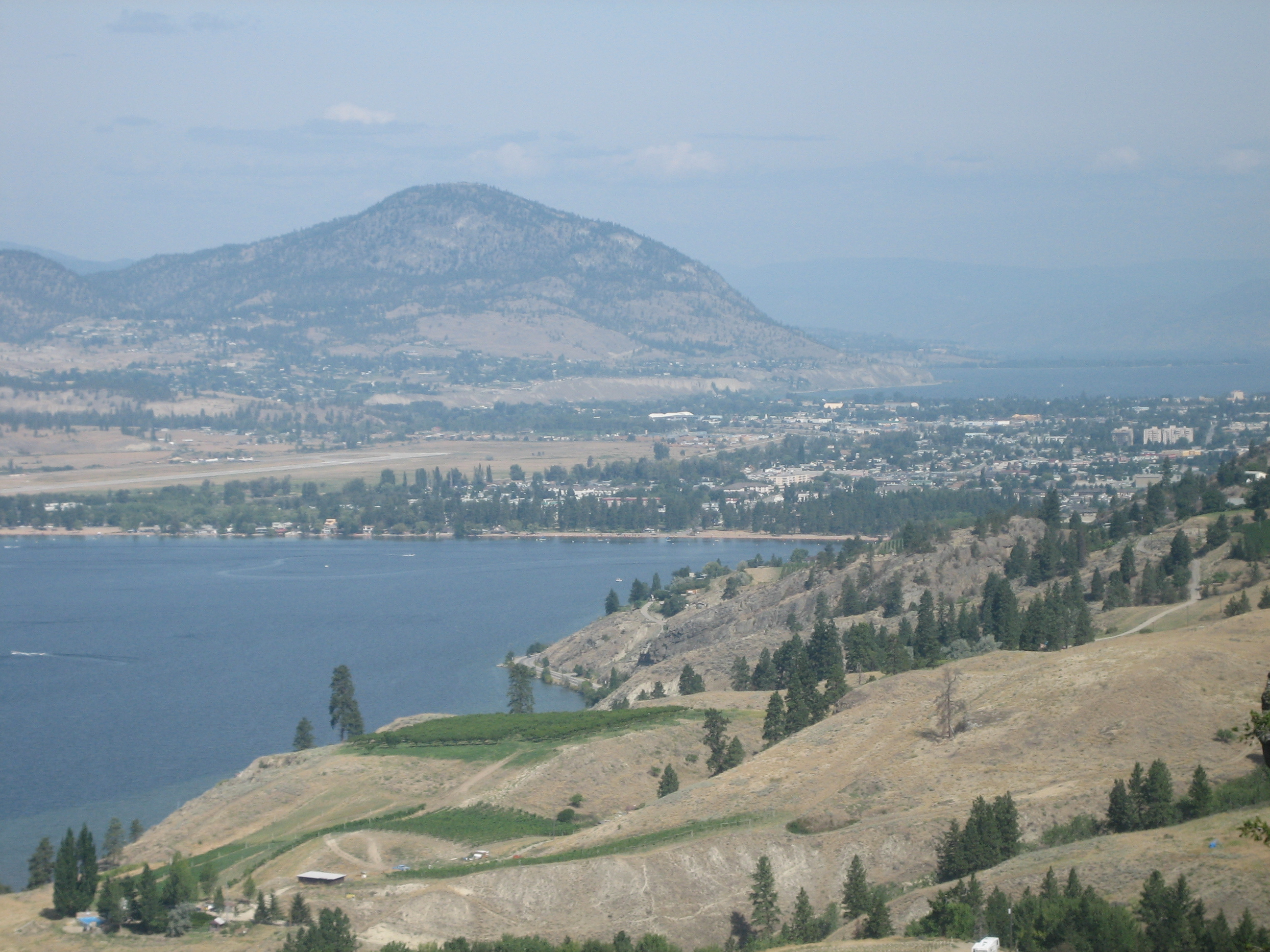
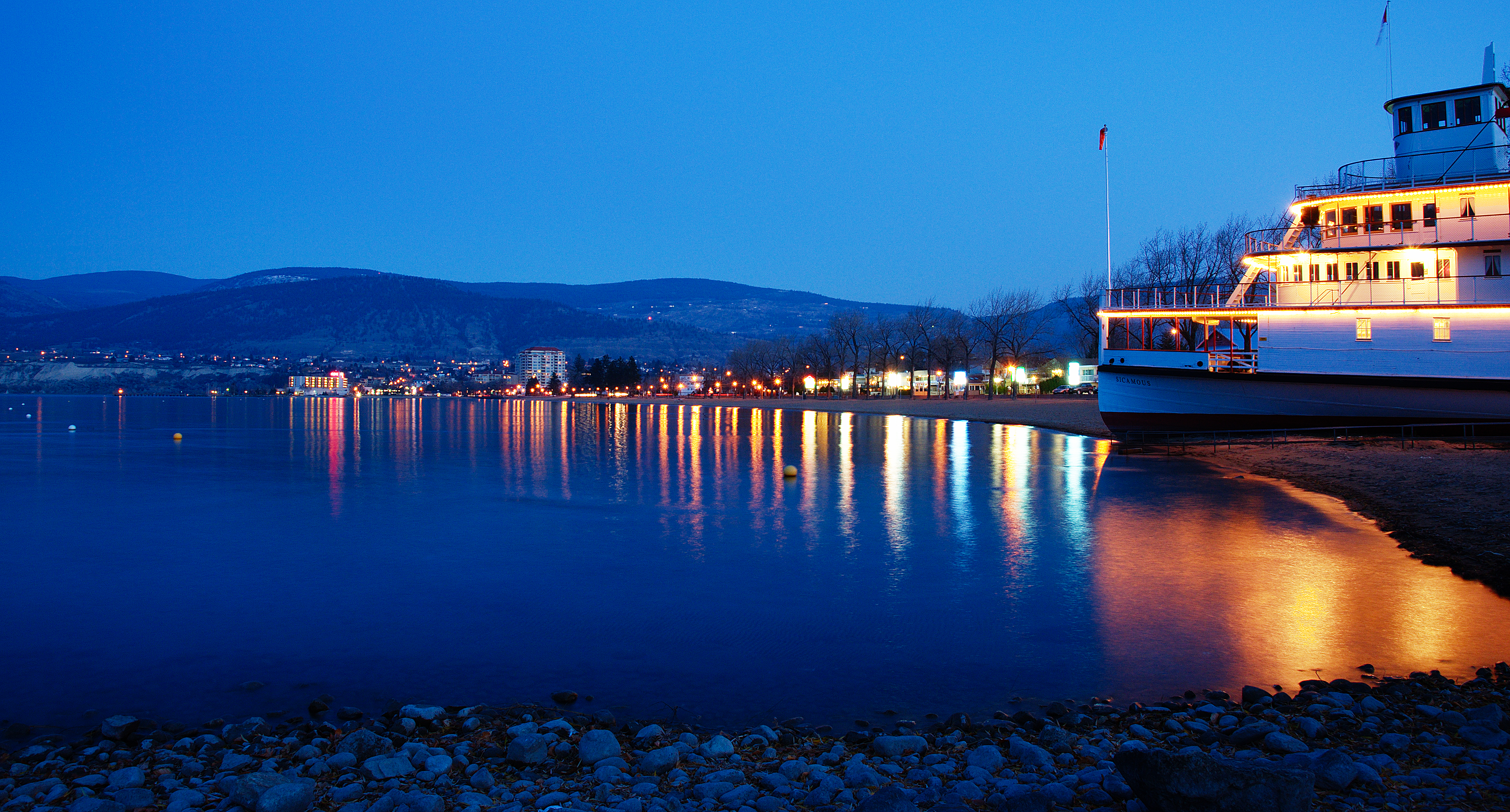
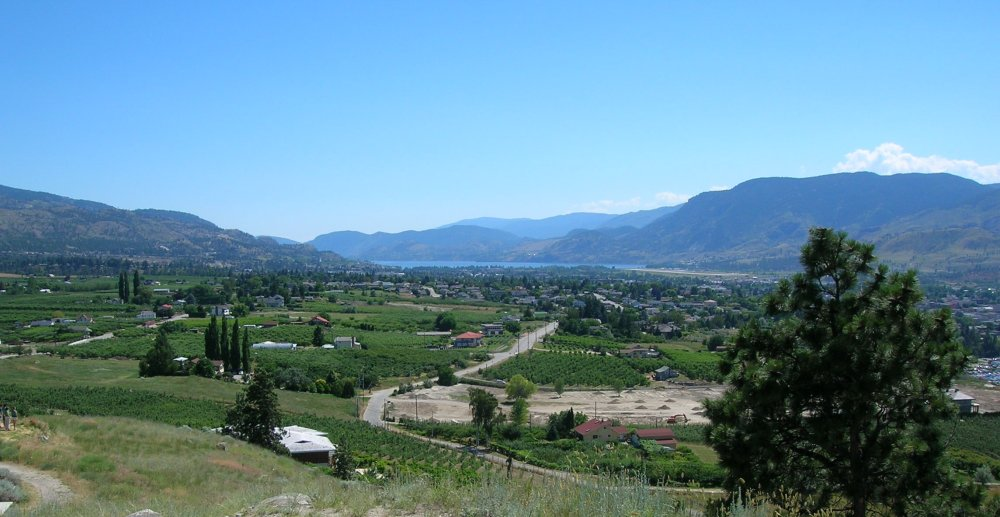
- From top, left to right: Penticton from Skaha Lake, Penticton waterfront and the SS Sicamous at night, Penticton from Munson Mountain

- Flag Coat of arms Logo
- Nickname: The Peach City
- Motto: A Place to Stay Forever
- Location of Penticton Penticton (Canada)
- Coordinates: 49°30′03″N 119°35′38″W
- Country: Canada
- Province: British Columbia
- Region: Okanagan
- Regional district: Okanagan-Similkameen
- Incorporated • District: December 31, 1908
  - City: May 10, 1948

Government
  - Mayor: Dan Ashton
  - Council: Penticton City Council
  - MPs: Helena Konanz
  - MLAs: Tracy St. Claire

Area (2021)
  - City: 43.03 km^{2} (16.61 sq mi)
  - Metro: 1,734.72 km^{2} (669.78 sq mi)
- Elevation: 344 m (1,129 ft)

Population (2021)
  - City: 36,885
  - Density: 857.3/km^{2} (2,220/sq mi)
  - Metro: 47,380 (65th)
  - Metro density: 27.3/km^{2} (71/sq mi)
- Demonym: Pentictonite
- Time zone: UTC−07:00 (PT)
- Forward sortation area: V2A
- Area codes: 250, 778, 236, 672
- Highways: Highway 97
- Waterways: Okanagan Lake, Okanagan River, Skaha Lake
- Website: penticton.ca

Penticton (/pɛnˈtɪktən/ pen-TIK-tən) is a city in the Okanagan Valley of British Columbia, Canada, situated between Okanagan and Skaha lakes. In the 2021 Canadian Census, its population was 36,885, while its census agglomeration population was 47,380.

== Name origin ==
The name Penticton is derived from the Okanagan word snpintktn. It is conventionally translated as "a place to stay forever" but is actually a reference to the year-round flow of Okanagan Lake through Penticton where it enters Skaha Lake. Differing accounts of the meaning are given in the BC Geographical Names entry for the city:

Place where water passes beyond.

— Information from Isaac Harris, published in Vernon News, July 18, 1918; compare with: "Derived from the Okanagan dialect of the Salish tribe, the word Pen-tak-tin meaning 'a place of permanent abode where waters pass by'." (50th Anniversary booklet of Penticton, 1958)

From the Indian name Pente-hik-ton, "ever" or "forever", referring to the constant, steady flow of the Okanagan River out of the lake.... applied by the Indians to the locality at the outlet of the lake, meaning that the stream ran on ever, or forever, in contrast to other streams which dried up during the summer (6th Report of the Okanagan Historical Society); compare with: "Derives from the Okanagan word Sin-peen-tick-tin, loosely translatable as 'permanent place'."

— c1980 advice from Randy Bouchard, BC Indian Language Project.

== History ==
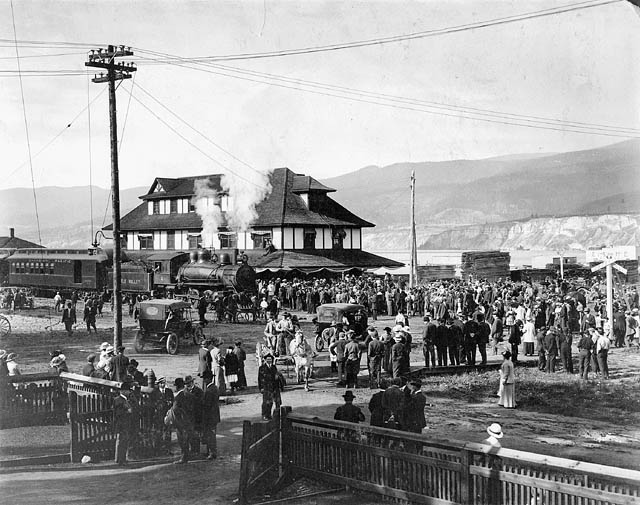
Headquarters of the Kettle Valley Railway were situated in Penticton.

The site of the city was first settled by the Syilx (Okanagan people), of the Interior Salish languages group, who initially named the community Phthauntac, meaning the "ideal meeting place", followed by Penticton, meaning a "place to stay forever", or officially "a place where people live year-round" in the Okanagan language. They settled around the city's two lakes: Skaha Lake and Okanagan Lake; the former was originally known as Dog Lake. Their descendants form the Penticton Indian Band, a First Nations government part of the Okanagan Nation Alliance situated near Penticton.

In 1866, Irishman Thomas Ellis and his family travelled to Penticton, and became the first white settlers. He started to develop a community by building a cattle empire, and planting fruit trees. The Penticton Hotel was established in 1892 by Ellis, who positioned it around the local government area, and its first road: Front Street. The sidewalks on the street were made from wood, with coal oil lamps being introduced to the sidewalk. Ellis and his relatives retired in 1892, and sold a portion of their land to property dealers. Around this time, a number of European fur traders travelled through Penticton and the surrounding communities.

The sternwheeler SS Aberdeen, which began service on Okanagan Lake in 1892, meant that more services could be shipped to the area. A group of residents formed their own local public government board for the community, by 1907, in the hopes of promoting the area. It was referred to as the Board of Trade, who attempted to specialize in arts, commerce, education, and recreation. Another sternwheeler was constructed at Okanagan Landing and launched that same year, the SS Okanagan, for use on Okanagan Lake, while other sternwheelers served Penticton and other communities on Skaha Lake.

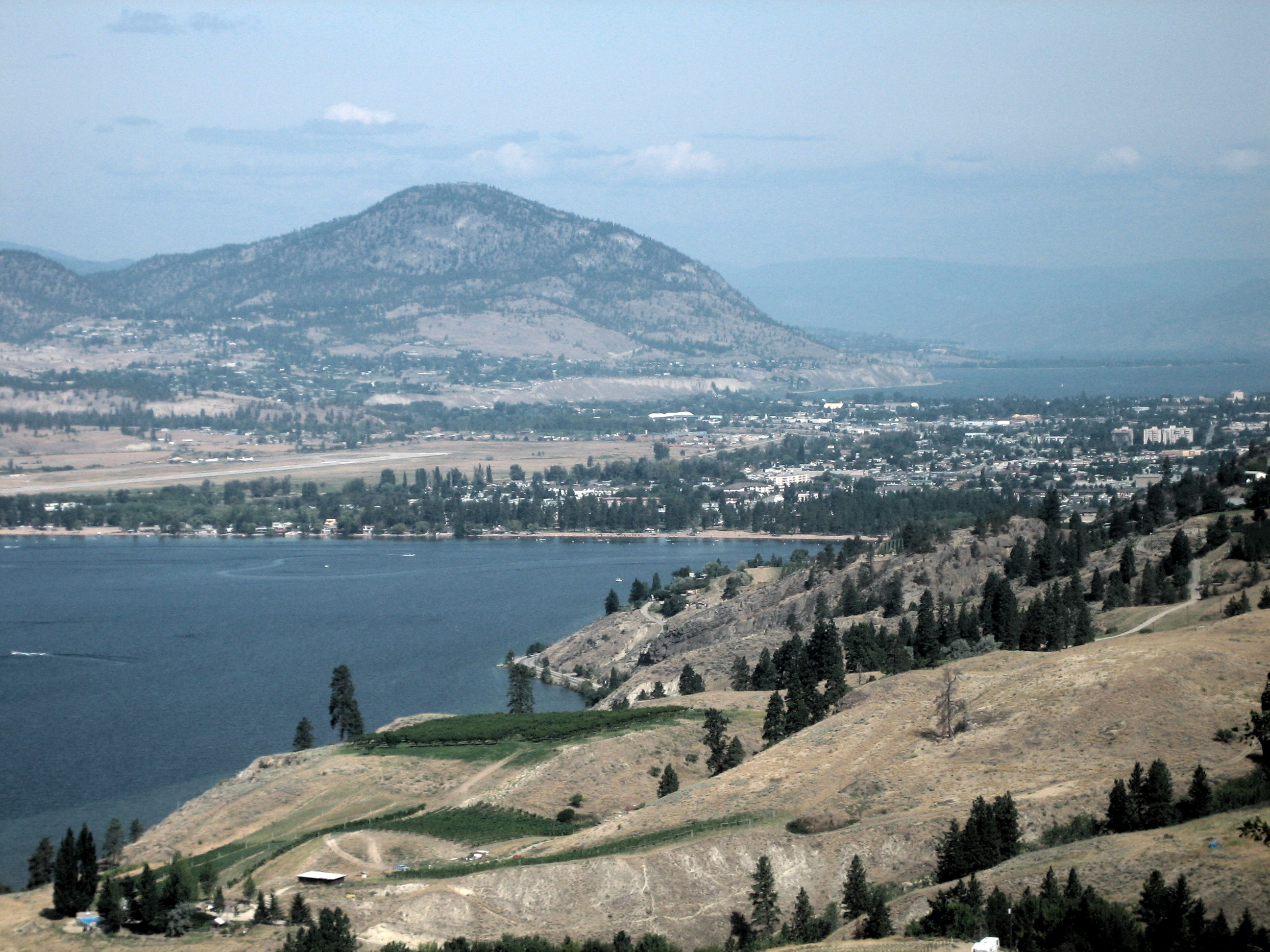
An aerial view of Penticton; Skaha Lake can be seen in the foreground, while Okanagan Lake is visible in the background. Penticton Regional Airport's runway can also be seen.

Penticton was incorporated as a district municipality on December 31, 1908. Shortly after the district was incorporated, the fruit trees planted by Ellis, many of them apple trees, started to grow. Residents of the area packed fruit in boxes, so they could distribute it worldwide. In 1912, the Canadian Pacific Railway (CPR) developed the Incola Hotel for the city, which operated for approximately 70 years. The Penticton Aquatic Club was a center of entertainment.

During World War I, the SS Sicamous came to the community, while the Kettle Valley Railway train service began operating, by moving specific passengers. In 1949, Penticton purchased the ship from the Canadian Pacific Railway. The Penticton Regional Airport was developed during World War II due to wartime military air transportation concerns, which acted as an emergency landing strip until its tarmac was completed. Its land was expropriated from the Penticton Indian Band in 1949 under the War Measures Act.

In 1948, a provincial highway opened between Hope and Princeton, which allowed access to Penticton, and created competition for the Kettle Valley Railway; headquarters for the railway were chosen to be in Penticton, in 1910, but the location burnt down in 1964. Much of the railroad's original route has been converted to a multi-use recreational trail, known as the Kettle Valley Rail Trail, which carries the Trans Canada Trail through this part of British Columbia. It was incorporated as a city on May 10, 1948, with the Governor General of Canada declaring this. Reeve Robert Lyon served Penticton as the first mayor, while Lord Alexander was made a freeman of the city.

During a series of church fires in 2021–thought to be associated with the outrage following the discovery of many purported burials at Canadian Indian residential school sites–Sacred Heart Mission Church in Penticton was burned on 21 June 2021. Sacred Heart Mission was one of two Catholic churches burned that day, the other roughly 40 minutes away on Osoyoos land.

== Geography ==
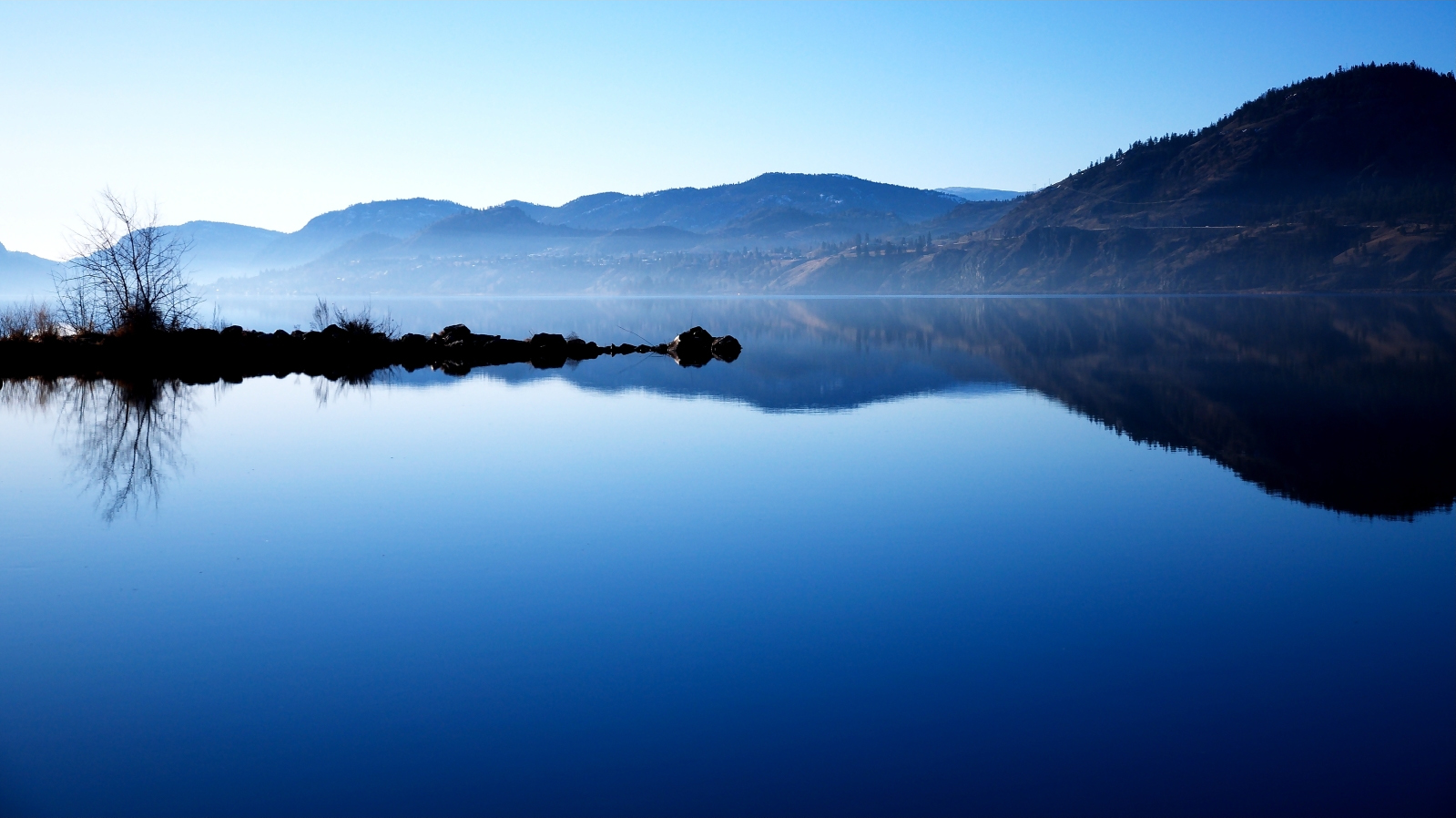
Skaha Lake sits along the Okanagan River near Penticton.

Penticton is located at the geographical coordinates of 49°29′28″N 119°35′19″W and covers an area of 43.03 km^{2} (16.61 sq mi), with a maximum north–south distance of 7 km (4.3 mi) wide between the Okanagan Lake to the north and Skaha Lake to the south; these lakes are part of the drainage system of the Okanagan River, a tributary of the Columbia River. Its borders are formed by Skaha Lake Road to the south and west, which changes to Highway 97 after city limits, Naramata Road to the east, and to the west, Highway 97. Penticton has an elevation of 385 m (1,263 ft), and is situated five hours from Seattle, Washington, and Vancouver, British Columbia in another direction; and eight hours from Calgary, Alberta, by highway.

=== Topography ===
Penticton is the largest city by area and population in, and the seat of, the Okanagan-Similkameen Regional District, which is part of the Okanagan as a whole, for which the city is the third largest in the region. It is the 21st largest settlement in British Columbia itself by population, while its metropolitan area, including the city plus Okanagan-Similkameen Electoral Area D, serves as the 71st largest in Canada; by area, Penticton ranks 20th in its province; statistics are based on the 2011 Canadian Census. It lies at the south bottom of Okanagan Lake, and north beginning of Skaha Lake. Between Okanagan Lake and Skaha Lake are a number of residential areas, farms, which grow orchard and wine products.

Pine and fir are commonly found in the mountains and high country around Penticton, which include the Okanagan Highland, and to its east, the Monashee Mountains. Apex Mountain Resort, which sits 33 km (21 mi) west of the city on the Thompson Plateau, is home to the tallest mountain peak in the Penticton area; ski services are offered. The Okanagan Highland is an intermediary plateau-like hilly country between the Okanagan Valley and the Monashee Mountains.

=== Climate ===
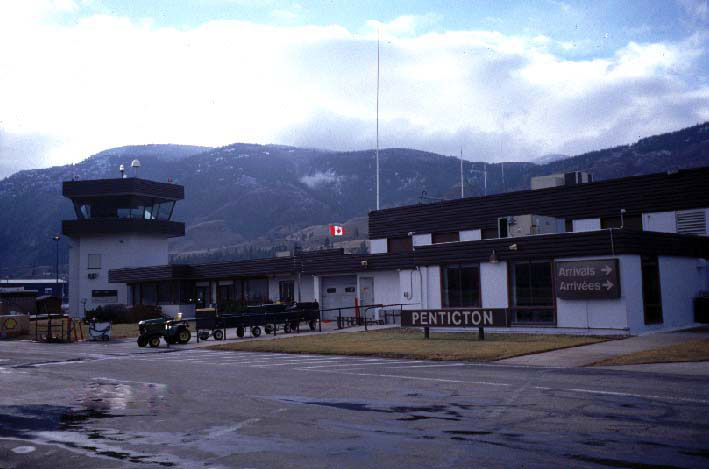
The local and upcoming weather for the city is observed at the Penticton Regional Airport.

Penticton has a semi-arid climate (Köppen climate classification: BSk). Penticton has low precipitation, hot summer days with cool nights, and moderately cool, mostly cloudy winters. With 346.0 mm (13.62 in) of annual precipitation, Penticton is the fourth driest city in Canada. It averages 58.7 cm (23.1 in) of snowfall per year. Penticton has the mildest winter of any non-coastal city in Canada.

The high daytime temperatures throughout the summer means that Penticton has on average the second most number of days in a year over 30 °C (86 °F) (after Kamloops) and the city has the lowest amount of fog in Canada. Penticton experiences 1,923 sunshine hours annually, lower than one might expect in a dry climate. This is the result of temperature inversions during the winter that leave a layer of cloud cover at the top of the valley where warm moist air collides with the cooler dry air that fills the valley. During December and January, Penticton is one of the cloudiest places in Canada. By contrast, the summer months are some of the most cloud-free in the country. Overall the sun shines for 39 per cent of daylight hours, varying between a low of 13 per cent in December and January to 62.6 per cent in August.

Mean relative humidity hovers between 63–77 per cent in the morning throughout the year, but afternoon mean relative humidity is more uneven, ranging from 36 per cent in July to 69 per cent in January and December. The local and upcoming weather of Penticton is observed at the Penticton Regional Airport by Environment and Climate Change Canada. It typically experiences four distinct seasons annually, having hot summers, relatively mild winters, and little snow, according to the British Columbia government based on statistics from Environment and Climate Change Canada. Despite having a mild winter by Canadian standards, Penticton often sees moderate stretches of below freezing weather, typically confined to December and January.

The highest temperature ever recorded in Penticton was 44.2 °C (111.6 °F) on June 30, 2021, and the lowest was −27.6 °C (−17.7 °F) on January 13, 2024.

Climate data for Penticton (Penticton Regional Airport) WMO ID: 71889; coordinates 49°27′47″N 119°36′08″W; elevation: 344.4 m (1,130 ft); 1991−2020 normals, extremes 1907−present (Note: Climate data was recorded at Penticton from April 1907 to March 1941 and at Penticton Airport from April 1941 to present.)
Month	Jan	Feb	Mar	Apr	May	Jun	Jul	Aug	Sep	Oct	Nov	Dec	Year
Record high humidex	14.1	15.9	21.1	29.4	34.7	46.0	42.1	41.1	36.2	27.1	18.9	22.5	46.0
Record high °C (°F)	15.7 (60.3)	17.8 (64.0)	22.0 (71.6)	30.6 (87.1)	34.4 (93.9)	44.2 (111.6)	40.6 (105.1)	38.9 (102.0)	36.6 (97.9)	28.9 (84.0)	19.4 (66.9)	22.5 (72.5)	44.2 (111.6)
Mean daily maximum °C (°F)	1.6 (34.9)	4.7 (40.5)	10.2 (50.4)	15.7 (60.3)	21.4 (70.5)	24.6 (76.3)	29.2 (84.6)	28.4 (83.1)	22.6 (72.7)	14.3 (57.7)	6.7 (44.1)	2.1 (35.8)	15.1 (59.2)
Daily mean °C (°F)	−0.8 (30.6)	0.8 (33.4)	4.9 (40.8)	9.1 (48.4)	14.3 (57.7)	17.6 (63.7)	21.4 (70.5)	20.6 (69.1)	15.6 (60.1)	8.9 (48.0)	3.4 (38.1)	−0.4 (31.3)	9.6 (49.3)
Mean daily minimum °C (°F)	−3.2 (26.2)	−3.2 (26.2)	−0.6 (30.9)	2.4 (36.3)	7.1 (44.8)	10.6 (51.1)	13.5 (56.3)	12.8 (55.0)	8.5 (47.3)	3.5 (38.3)	0.0 (32.0)	−2.8 (27.0)	4.1 (39.4)
Record low °C (°F)	−27.6 (−17.7)	−26.7 (−16.1)	−17.8 (0.0)	−8.1 (17.4)	−5.6 (21.9)	0.0 (32.0)	2.2 (36.0)	0.6 (33.1)	−5.6 (21.9)	−14.5 (5.9)	−22.3 (−8.1)	−27.2 (−17.0)	−27.6 (−17.7)
Record low wind chill	−32.6	−34.0	−27.8	−11.0	−10.1	0.0	0.0	0.0	−6.0	−21.2	−34.0	−39.7	−39.7
Average precipitation mm (inches)	28.1 (1.11)	19.3 (0.76)	22.7 (0.89)	25.6 (1.01)	38.2 (1.50)	43.8 (1.72)	28.3 (1.11)	27.0 (1.06)	24.5 (0.96)	28.9 (1.14)	28.1 (1.11)	29.6 (1.17)	344.1 (13.55)
Average rainfall mm (inches)	12.9 (0.51)	12.6 (0.50)	18.0 (0.71)	25.1 (0.99)	38.2 (1.50)	43.8 (1.72)	28.3 (1.11)	27.0 (1.06)	24.5 (0.96)	28.9 (1.14)	21.9 (0.86)	12.2 (0.48)	293.3 (11.55)
Average snowfall cm (inches)	19.1 (7.5)	8.6 (3.4)	5.2 (2.0)	0.6 (0.2)	0.0 (0.0)	0.0 (0.0)	0.0 (0.0)	0.0 (0.0)	0.0 (0.0)	0.2 (0.1)	7.5 (3.0)	20.4 (8.0)	61.6 (24.3)
Average precipitation days (≥ 0.2 mm)	13.0	10.1	9.4	8.9	10.9	10.9	7.4	6.4	7.4	9.7	12.2	14.0	120.2
Average rainy days (≥ 0.2 mm)	6.9	6.8	8.1	8.7	10.9	10.9	7.4	6.4	7.4	9.7	9.8	6.4	99.3
Average snowy days (≥ 0.2 cm)	8.1	4.4	2.1	0.35	0.0	0.0	0.0	0.0	0.0	0.09	3.1	9.7	27.9
Average relative humidity (%) (at 1500 LST)	72.3	61.5	48.3	39.0	38.7	38.8	33.3	34.0	41.0	52.6	65.8	72.0	49.8
Mean monthly sunshine hours	35.0	81.4	144.3	189.7	234.3	237.3	287.9	279.7	212.3	135.0	53.0	33.7	1,923.3
Percentage possible sunshine	13.0	28.6	39.2	46.1	49.3	48.8	58.7	62.6	56.0	40.3	19.3	13.2	39.6
Source: Environment and Climate Change Canada (sun 1981–2010) (June maximum) (December maximum) (January minimum)

== Demographics ==
Historical population
Year	Pop.	±%
1921	3,979	—
1931	4,640	+16.6%
1941	5,777	+24.5%
1951	10,548	+82.6%
1956	11,894	+12.8%
1961	13,859	+16.5%
1966	15,330	+10.6%
1971	18,146	+18.4%
1976	21,344	+17.6%
1981	23,181	+8.6%
1986	23,588	+1.8%
1991	27,258	+15.6%
1996	30,987	+13.7%
2001	30,985	−0.0%
2006	31,909	+3.0%
2011	32,877	+3.0%
2016	33,761	+2.7%
2021	36,885	+9.3%
Sources: Statistics Canada

In the 2021 Canadian census conducted by Statistics Canada, Penticton had a population of 36,885 living in 17,361 of its 18,457 total private dwellings, a change of 9.3 per cent from its 2016 population of 33,761. With a land area of 43.03 km^{2} (16.61 sq mi), it had a population density of 857.2/km^{2} (2,220.1/sq mi) in 2021.

In 2016. Penticton has a dwelling occupancy rate of 93.2 per cent. The median value of a private dwelling is $359,167, just under the national median of $374,975. The median age is 52.4, much higher than the national median age of 41.2. 29.0 per cent of residents are 65 years or older, compared to 16.9 per cent nationally. In 2024, the median value of a single family home is priced at $750,000 CAD.

=== Ethnicity ===
As of 2021, 84.3 per cent of residents are white, while 8.9 per cent are visible minorities, and 6.8 per cent are Indigenous. The largest visible minority groups in Penticton are South Asian (3.2 per cent), Filipino (1.4 per cent), Chinese (1.0 per cent), and Black (0.7 per cent), and Japanese (0.5 per cent).

Panethnic groups in the City of Penticton (2001−2021)
Panethnic group	2021		2016		2011		2006		2001	
Panethnic group	Pop.	%	Pop.	%	Pop.	%	Pop.	%	Pop.	%
European (Note: Statistic includes all persons that did not make up part of a visible minority or an indigenous identity.)	30,110	84.28%	28,000	86.18%	28,050	88.43%	28,510	90.83%	27,990	91.05%
Indigenous	2,420	6.77%	2,220	6.83%	2,005	6.32%	990	3.15%	960	3.12%
South Asian	1,130	3.16%	920	2.83%	710	2.24%	990	3.15%	755	2.46%
East Asian (Note: Statistic includes total responses of "Chinese", "Korean", and "Japanese" under visible minority section on census.)	685	1.92%	490	1.51%	295	0.93%	420	1.34%	485	1.58%
Southeast Asian (Note: Statistic includes total responses of "Filipino" and "Southeast Asian" under visible minority section on census.)	670	1.88%	500	1.54%	280	0.88%	280	0.89%	305	0.99%
African	265	0.74%	95	0.29%	120	0.38%	20	0.06%	65	0.21%
Latin American	175	0.49%	105	0.32%	100	0.32%	75	0.24%	175	0.57%
Middle Eastern (Note: Statistic includes total responses of "West Asian" and "Arab" under visible minority section on census.)	120	0.34%	55	0.17%	75	0.24%	25	0.08%	20	0.07%
Other/multiracial (Note: Statistic includes total responses of "Visible minority, n.i.e." and "Multiple visible minorities" under visible minority section on census.)	150	0.42%	100	0.31%	75	0.24%	85	0.27%	0	0%
Total responses	35,725	96.86%	32,490	96.24%	31,720	96.48%	31,390	98.37%	30,740	99.21%
Total population	36,885	100%	33,761	100%	32,877	100%	31,909	100%	30,985	100%
Note: Totals greater than 100% due to multiple origin responses.

=== Language ===
As of 2016, 86.4 per cent of residents spoke English as their first language. Other common mother tongues are German (2.2 per cent), Punjabi (1.8 per cent), French (1.8 per cent), Portuguese (0.7 per cent) and Tagalog (0.6 per cent).

=== Religion ===
According to the 2021 census, religious groups in Penticton included:

- Irreligion (19,645 persons or 55.0 per cent)
- Christianity (14,575 persons or 40.8 per cent)
- Sikhism (750 persons or 2.1 per cent)
- Hinduism (170 persons or 0.5 per cent)
- Buddhism (155 persons or 0.4 per cent)
- Islam (90 persons or 0.3 per cent)
- Judaism (60 persons or 0.2 per cent)
- Indigenous Spirituality (45 persons or 0.1 per cent)

As of 2011, 52.9 per cent of residents were Christian. The largest denominations were Catholic (15.8 per cent), other Christian (14.5 per cent) United Church (8.6 per cent), Anglican (4.7 per cent), and Baptist (2.0 per cent) The largest minority religions were Sikhism, practised by 1.7 per cent of the population and Buddhism, practised by 0.5 per cent, while 43.5 per cent held no religious affiliation.

== Architecture ==
According to SkyscraperPage, there are eight notable buildings in Penticton, the largest of which are the Lakeshore buildings, which are 15 floors, with the building's construction by concrete completing in 2008. The building is associated with an engineering organization, construction company, and real estate agency, but was made for residential use. At ten stories each, The Athens Creek Tower and Alysen Place are tied for Penticton's second-tallest building. The third-largest building, Cherry Lane Towers, is eight floors, and is also residential.

== Public spaces ==
Due to its warm climate, the city has a diverse array of public spaces, from parks to hiking trails. It is home to ten public parks, including Gyro Park, Lakawanna Park, Marina Way Park, Okanagan Lake Park, Penticton Youth Park, Rose Garden, Rotary Centennial Pavilion, Rotary Park, Skaha Lake Park, and Munson Mountain. There are also seven beaches situated in the city, including Okanagan Lake Beach, Skaha Lake Beach, Airport Beach, Marina Way Beach, Okanagan Lake Park Beach, Sudbury Beach, and Three Mile Beach.

The larger metropolitan area contains the Okanagan Falls Provincial Park, located in the unincorporated community Okanagan Falls. Penticton maintains a policy on dogs that are allowed at parks or beaches. Other public spaces include trails, such as part of the Trans Canada Trail, and Kettle Valley Railway; the former was formed throughout Canada, while the latter runs through Penticton and nearby Kelowna. Rock climbing area Skaha Bluffs is located south of city centre on a hillside above the Skaha Lake in the Skaha Bluffs Provincial Park. With over 1,200 documented routes, it is the second most popular rock climbing area in British Columbia, after the Smoke Bluffs in Squamish.

== Education ==
Penticton is served by School District 67 Okanagan Skaha, a school district with education institutions also based in nearby communities Naramata, Kaleden, and Summerland; its head office is held in Penticton itself. The district administers children from kindergarten to grade 12 locally, those of which are between kindergarten to grade five attend elementary schools, while children in grades between grade six to eight attend middle schools; ninth to 12th graders are served by secondary schools. School District 67 Okanagan Skaha currently maintains 11 elementary schools, four middle schools, and three secondary schools, including Penticton Secondary School and Princess Margaret Secondary School. On June 30, 2016, School District 67 closed McNicoll Park Middle School. During the 2016/2017 school year School District 67 operated 10 elementary schools, 3 middle schools, and 3 high schools. Penticton has three independent schools; Penticton Christian School, Holy Cross School, and Concordia Lutheran School.

The Conseil scolaire francophone de la Colombie-Britannique operates two Francophone schools: école Entre-lacs primary school and the école secondaire de Penticton.

The city is home to a Sprott Shaw College campus, and an Okanagan College campus, the latter of which, in 2010, had an enrolment of 610. It also contains the Okanagan Hockey School, which has had partnerships with professional hockey teams, such as the Vancouver Canucks.

The Penticton Public Library was founded in 1909; from 1948 to 1968, it was a part of the Okanagan Regional Library. In 1968, a successful referendum separated the library from the Okanagan Regional Library.

== Sports ==
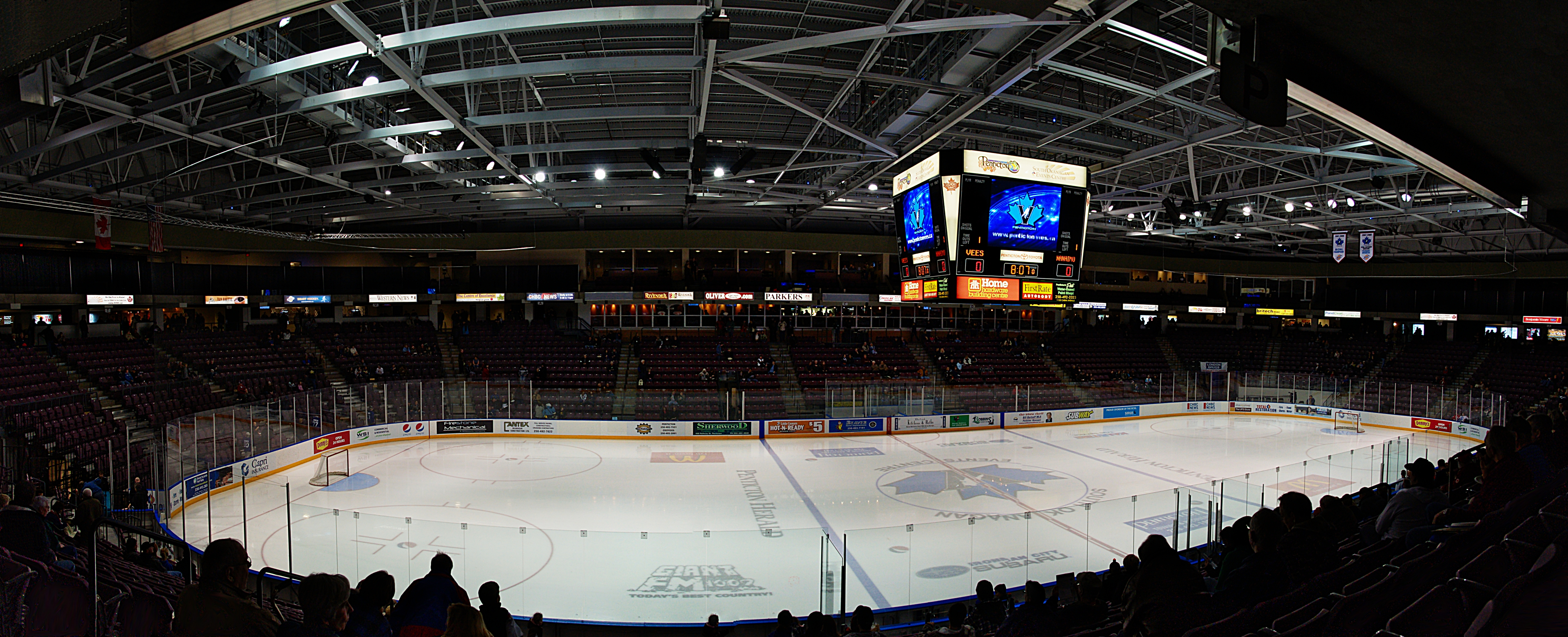
The South Okanagan Events Centre is the venue of a number of sport teams in Penticton.

The city hosts games played by ice hockey teams Penticton Vees, a major junior team in the Western Hockey League. Prior to the 2025-26 season, the Vees were a junior "A" team in the British Columbia Hockey League, and one of the most successful Junior A teams in Canadian history. (BCHL), The city formerly hosted the Penticton Lakers, a junior "B" team in the Kootenay International Junior Hockey League (KIJHL). The Vees play at the South Okanagan Events Centre, while the latter played in the arena of the neighbouring Okanagan Hockey School. The former were founded in 1961, and have won the Doyle Cup, and Royal Bank Cup, while the latter were established in 2009. The Penticton Upperdek Vees are also a junior ice hockey that were founded in 2008, and also play at the South Okanagan Events Centre; people who have special needs are part of the team's squad, which is in the Special Needs Hockey League (SNHL).

The Penticton Pinnacles are a soccer team that were established in 1997 that play at the Kings Park for the Pacific Coast Soccer League (PCSL), the Penticton Pistoleras, a local roller derby team part of the South Okanagan Roller Derby Association, and Penticton Harlequins, a local rugby team in the British Columbia Rugby Union, also play tournaments for the city; the South Okanagan Event Centre serves as both of their venues.

Beside team sports, the city hosted the 2010 British Columbia Scotties Tournament of Hearts, 2010 World Junior A Challenge, 2013 Continental Cup of Curling., the 2016 BC Winter Games, the 2017 International Triathlon Union Multisport World Championships and Curling Canada's 2018 Scotties Tournament of Hearts.

== Events ==
Penticton hosts many events annually, among them the Super League Penticton Triathlon, the Valley First Granfondo Axel Merckx Okanagan, the Okanagan Wine Festival, the Okanagan Children's Festival, Meadowlark Nature Festival, Which takes place on the May long weekend Fest-of-Ale BC, the Penticton Peach Festival (commonly known as "Peachfest"), the Miss Penticton Pageant, which takes place during the Penticton Peach Festival, the Pentastic Hot Jazz Festival, the Peach City Beach Cruise, and the Elvis Festival, which was featured in the Summer 2006 issue of British Columbia Magazine. Penticton was home to the Ironman Canada race; the final Penticton Ironman was held in 2024.

== Recreation ==
Penticton offers many kinds of recreation, including skiing at the Apex Mountain Resort ski area; boating and fishing on Skaha Lake and Okanagan Lake, golfing on the area's many courses, hiking and biking the Kettle Valley Railway Trail, and rock climbing at Skaha Bluffs. In the summer many people enjoy floating down the river channel that connects Okanagan Lake and Skaha Lake. It is home to the Western Hockey League (WHL) hockey team Penticton Vees who play throughout the winter season, and the PCSL soccer team Penticton Pinnacles, who play May–July.

Completed in 2011, the Penticton Community Centre is a modern facility with many health, fitness and recreation options. The Penticton Community Centre is located at 325 Power Street.

In September 2006, Penticton residents voted 80.3 per in favour of the construction of the South Okanagan Events Centre (SOEC). The $73 million arena, sports complex and convention centre is the home of the BCHL's Penticton Vees, named in honour of the senior hockey team that won the 1955 Ice Hockey World Championships against Russia. The SOEC also serves as a summer or early fall training facility for the Vancouver Canucks. It has boosted the city's convention market and is a popular venue for concert tours and other special events. Notable shows hosted at the SOEC in recent years have been Rihanna, Ringo Starr & His All-Starr Band, Def Leppard, Carrie Underwood and several Cirque du Soleil shows.

Every Saturday from mid April to the end of October, the Penticton Farmers' Market runs on a downtown section of Main Street. Then, from Victoria Day weekend to Labour Day weekend a second market, the Downtown Penticton Community Market, runs alongside and combines to form one of the largest outdoor market events in BC. Visitors come from all around for this Saturday morning event which sees over 10,000 visitors per day at its peak in July–August.

The Penticton Art Gallery (formerly the Art Gallery of the South Okanagan) is a registered not-for-profit charitable organization. Exhibits feature international and local artists, and the gallery offers art workshops and seasonal events. During the winter holidays, there is a special "art under $500" event.

Penticton is the hub of wine tourism in the Okanagan Valley, with 120 wineries within an hour's drive and over 40 wineries within city limits. Craft beer, distilled spirits, and cider are also widely manufactured. Penticton is known for its early involvement in the craft brewing movement and is a featured route in BC Ale Trails.

The Kettle Valley Rail Trail, with trail heads leading to more than 160 km (99 mi) of flat, railbed trails for hiking and biking, can be accessed from Penticton. This trail is part of the Trans Canada Trail.

== Infrastructure ==
=== Electrical ===
The Electric Utility is owned and operated by the City of Penticton Electrical providing electrical service to the community's residential, commercial and industrial customers. The Fortis Connection are made at three substations Carmi Ave, Huth Ave, Abbott St.

=== Transportation ===
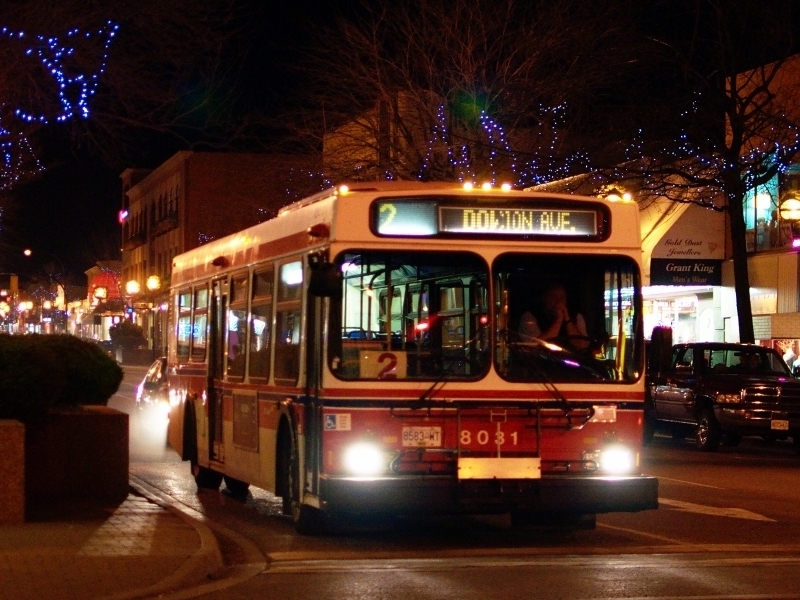
Mass local transit in Penticton is offered by the Penticton Transit System.

Mass local transit in Penticton and Okanagan-Similkameen is offered by the South Okanagan-Similkameen Transit System under the BC Transit label, operating on six routes. There is also a service for people who are unable to use regular transit, HandyDART. The bus transportation system is funded by Penticton, Okanagan-Similkameen, and BC Transit. Its services are provided to points of interest, such as the Cherry Lane Shopping Centre Downtown Penticton. as well as traversing the distance lake to lake.

A number of parks and recreation transportation services are offered in the city, including trails, such as part of the Trans Canada Trail, and Kettle Valley Railway; the former runs through Canada, while the latter runs through Penticton, and Kelowna. Headquarters for the trail was chosen to be in Penticton in 1910, but the location burnt down in 1964. The city has access to transportation corridors running north, south, east, and west, while the Highway 97 can also be accessed.

It is served by the Penticton Airport, a regional airport located 1.8 nautical miles (3.3 km; 2.1 mi) southwest of city centre. In 2018 a $6million upgrade to the facility was initiated to expand the departure and arrivals lounges as well as increase capacity for managing passenger flow. Although it has historically provided flights to several destinations, the airport currently offers flights to the Vancouver International Airport, which are provided by Air Canada Express; these services are provided three to four times daily, while the exception of Sunday, when two flights are available. WestJet Encore flies twice daily to its Calgary hub. The city is also home to the Penticton Water Aerodrome, a water aerodrome situated adjacent to the Penticton Airport and is home base to HNZ Topflight, an advanced helicopter flight training school operated by HNZ.

== Notable residents ==
- Jeannette Armstrong, Syilx Elder, Author, and Professor at UBCO
- Andy Bell, pro freestyle motocross champion, host of MTV's Nitro Circus
- George Bowering, poet, first ever Canadian Parliamentary Poet Laureate
- Tyler Breeze, professional wrestler
- Layla Claire, soprano
- Thomas Ellis, the first European settler in the area in 1866
- Gordon Herbert, basketball player and coach
- Brett Hull, National Hockey League (NHL) hockey player, graduate of Penticton High School
- Paul Kariya, retired NHL player, graduate of Penticton Secondary School
- Duncan Keith, NHL hockey player, graduate of Penticton Secondary School
- Alan Kerr, hockey player
- Jett Klyne, actor
- Shane Koyczan, spoken word poet
- Spencer Krug, musician from the band Wolf Parade
- Richard H. Leir, chief of maritime operations for the Canadian navy.
- Ivan McLelland, Penticton Vees player and 1955 IIHF World Hockey Champion
- Andy Moog, hockey player
- Brendan Morrison, NHL hockey player, graduate of Penticton High School
- Terry David Mulligan, actor and television personality
- Andi Naude, 2018 Olympian on the Canadian National Ski Team
- Bob Nicholson, CEO of the Edmonton Oilers
- Nakai Penny, professional rugby player for the Seattle Seawolves of Major League Rugby
- Cameron Phillips, radio broadcaster
- Justin Pogge, hockey player
- Mike Reno, musician from the band Loverboy
- Mark Allan Robinson, political activist
- Mark Rycroft, retired NHL player, Colorado Avalanche TV colour analyst
- Alexis Smith, actress
- Blake Wesley, hockey player

== Media ==
=== Radio stations ===
- AM 800 – CKOR, soft adult contemporary
- FM 92.9 - CFUZ-FM, Community radio station Peach City Radio
- FM 93.7 – CBTP-FM, CBC Radio One
- FM 97.1 – CJMG-FM, hot contemporary (Sun FM)
- FM 100.7 – CIGV-FM, country music

== International relations ==
In early 1975, residents of the Penticton area travelled to Japan, in order to search for business opportunities. They met Kaneyasa Marutani, the mayor of Ikeda, Hokkaido, a town in the Nakagawa regional district of Japan. He claimed that the town was proposing a sister city relationship, and stated that Penticton was a reasonable option, due to its similarities with winery production, cattle industry, and geographic features. Later that year, residents of the Ikeda area toured Penticton and met with the government of Penticton, reaching a decision to become a sister city in 1977.

Since 1977, Penticton has served as a sister city of Ikeda. The relationship is one of the oldest in Canada, with a number of residents having exchanged visits to the respective locations annually. In 1993, there was consideration for building a Japanese garden in Penticton, in order to honour their agreement, with the garden's construction beginning in 1997. It is known as the Penticton–Ikeda Japanese Garden.

== See also ==
- Dominion Radio Astrophysical Observatory
- Penticton Herald
- Penticton (crater)
- Penticton (electoral district)
