= Western clematis =

Western clematis is a common name for several plants and may refer to:

- Clematis ligusticifolia, native to western North America
- Clematis pubescens, native to western Australia
