= Incola Hotel =

Luxury hotel

Coordinates: 49.5019°N 119.5961°W

The Incola Hotel was a luxury hotel constructed by the Canadian Pacific Railway, CPR, company in the city of Penticton, British Columbia, Canada to provide quality accommodation for those traveling on the CPR mainline or steamships and passing through Penticton. The hotel opened in 1912 and served the city for 70 years before eventually being demolished in 1981.

== Construction ==
Construction began on August 2, 1911 on a 1.23-acre site at 100 Lakeshore Drive. The cost was estimated at $100 000. A liquor license was granted on December 11, 1911 and the hotel opened on August 19, 1912. The building was of black and white half-timber pattern, with a veranda and decorated in mock Tudor. Furniture was in solid oak and upholstered in leather. The four floors housed 62 rooms (14 had private baths), five public baths, a sun parlor, ladies' parlor, reading room, fireplace, billiard room, and music room. The hotel's first manager was W.J. Richardson from the Queen's Hotel in Toronto, Ontario. The hotel was built to accommodate passengers from the trains and CPR steamships such as the SS Sicamous.

== Amenities ==
The Incola was a luxury hotel with an elegant dining hall, as described by an Okanagan resident in the 1920s: "Dinner at the Incola Hotel was a real treat. The dining room at the Incola was on the second storey level, giving guests a view of the lake. Visitors went up a broad flight of steps to reach the entrance. The room was large and furnished with white linen-covered tables, high-back chairs, silverware, glassware, and imported English china. The food included English meat pies, seafood, and roast beef with Yorkshire Pudding. Desserts included a variety of tarts and pastries, often served from a tea cart."

The hotel also had telephones beginning in the early 1930s. According to an account by a worker involved in the installation, the telephones replaced wooden push-button buzzers previously used to summon a busboy.

== Events ==
Receptions, concerts, and dances were often held in the hotel. Passengers from the train and boats provided business and by 1928, there was lawn bowling on the grounds. During the 1930s, bands and orchestras often performed. The hotel also held events such as Board of Trade and Canadian Club dinners, Gyro, Kiwanis and Rotary luncheons, parties, and weddings, making the hotel the center of community life for decades.

== Decline ==
Decline began in 1948 with the opening of highways that increased Penticton's role as a resort and convention center. Rail business decreased and newer hotels were built. Between 1966 and 1975, the Incola underwent four ownership changes and new extensions and modifications erased the hotel's original appearance. Neglect led to safety hazards, resulting in the fire marshal's order to close the top floor in 1963. Two fires broke out in 1978, leaving a hole in the roof that was not repaired. Broken windows were boarded up and outside walls began to rot due to the absence of drain pipes. By the late 1970s, the premises had become a gathering place for bikers, minors, and regular performances by strippers that destroyed the hotel's reputation. It closed on August 27, 1979, and was demolished in March 1981.

== See also ==
- Canadian Pacific Railway
- Penticton
