= Okanagan Falls =

District municipality in British Columbia, Canada

Okanagan Falls sx̌ʷəx̌ʷnitkʷ
- District municipality
- District of Okanagan Falls
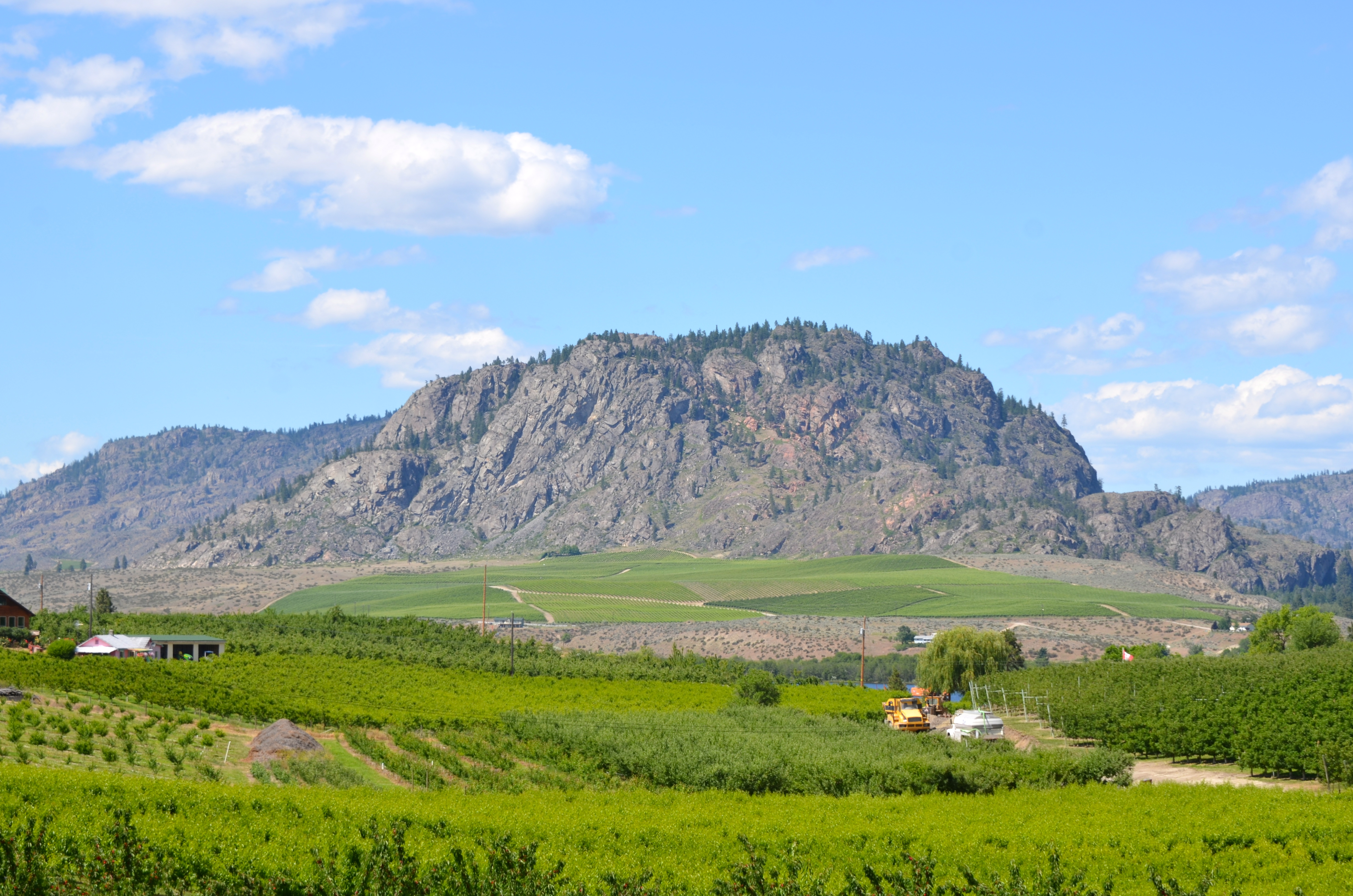
- Rolling hills of Okanagan Falls with Peach Cliff in the distance
- Nickname: OK Falls
- Location of Okanagan Falls in British Columbia
- Coordinates: 49°21′00″N 119°34′00″W
- Country: Canada
- Province: British Columbia
- Established: 1893
- Incorporated: 2026

Government
  - Type: Mayor–council
  - Mayor: Matt Taylor

Area
  - Total: 3.8174 km^{2} (1.4739 sq mi)

Population (2021)
  - Total: 2,266
- Time zone: UTC−07:00 (PCT)
- Area codes: 250, 778
- Website: okanaganfalls.ca

Okanagan Falls (also known as OK Falls) is a district municipality with a population of about 2,200 located on the south end of Skaha Lake in British Columbia, Canada. It was officially incorporated as the District of Okanagan Falls on November 6, 2026.

== History ==
The community was founded in 1893 as Dogtown. The current name derives from a small set of the falls that used to lie on the Okanagan River at the outlet of Skaha Lake. The falls have since been submerged beneath the lake due to the construction of a dam on the river.

=== Incorporation ===
In 2025, residents voted to incorporate as a municipality, with 53 percent in favour. On 6 November 2026, the community was incorporated under the name "District of Okanagan Falls".

== Geological features ==
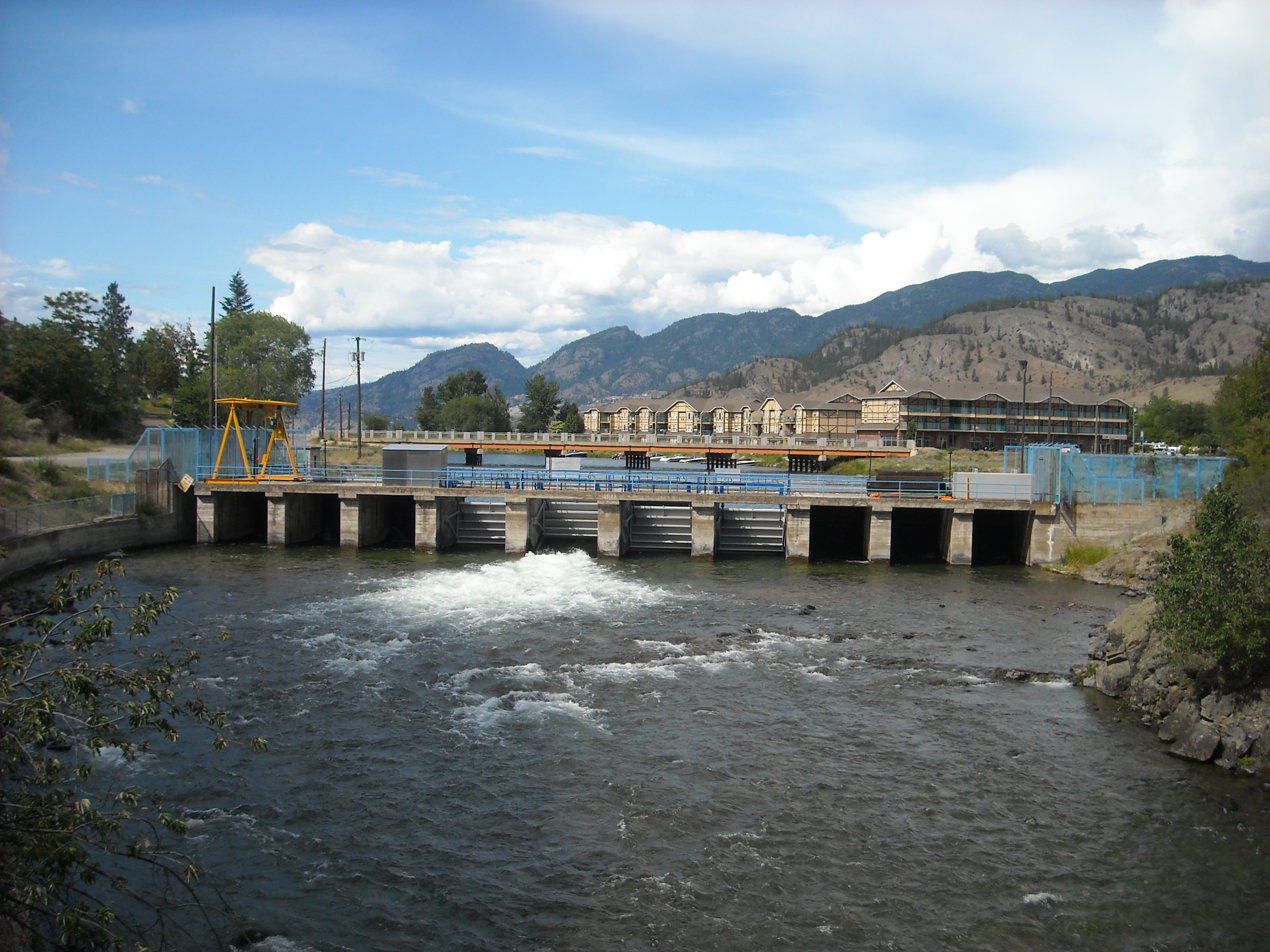
The namesake Okanagan Falls have long been submerged by the waters of Skaha Lake, which rose as a result of the construction of this small dam. The dam is located just south of the bridge along Highway 97 The dam is a vital component of the flood and irrigation controls of the region.

Nestled at the head of a giant spillway formed as the discharge of Glacial Lake Penticton was constrained between Mount McLellan to the west and Peach Cliff to the east. Okanagan Falls has a diverse assemblage of geological attractions.

=== Peach Cliff ===
Peach Cliff is a dominant landmark to the east of Okanagan Falls. It consists of trachyte of Eocene age. Peach Cliff is home to herds of mule deer and a sizeable herd of California bighorn sheep. Perched high on a spur of Peach Cliff is Balancing Rock, a large glacial erratic supported by a couple of granitic cobbles.

=== Indian Head ===
Southwest of Okanagan Falls, are the ragged cliffs of Indian Head, one of the most unusual rock formations in the Okanagan. Consisting of dark volcanic rocks overlying a lighter conglomerate. This formation contains spectacular megabreccia, volcanic and plutonic rocks up to 70 m (230 ft) across and metamorphic rocks of up to 500 m (1,600 ft) across.

=== Mahoney Lake ===
South of Okanagan Falls lies meromictic Mahoney Lake, home to spectacular blooms of purple sulphur bacteria. This purple is contrasted by nearby Green Lake, which is coloured by the precipitation of calcium carbonates in the water column.

== Observatory ==
The Dominion Radio Astrophysical Observatory is a research facility founded in 1960 and located southwest of Okanagan Falls and Penticton.

The site houses three instruments – an interferometric radio telescope, a 26 m (85 ft) single-dish antenna, and a solar flux monitor – and supports engineering laboratories. The DRAO is operated by the Herzberg Institute of Astrophysics of the National Research Council of the Canadian government.

The observatory was named an IEEE Milestone for first radio astronomical observations using VLBI. There is a self-guided tour available at the facility during daylight hours.

== Parks ==
Christie Memorial Provincial Park is located on the south shoreline of Skaha Lake. Okanagan Falls Provincial Park is also nearby.

== Government ==
Okanagan Falls is within the jurisdiction of the Regional District of Okanagan-Similkameen. The community was incorporated as a municipality under the name "District of Okanagan Falls" on 6 November 2026. The municipality is governed by an elected council composed of a mayor and four councillors.

=== Council ===
The inaugural council was elected in October 2026 and will take office on 6 November 2026.

Membership
Matt Taylor	Mayor
Amy Bydal	Councillor
Allison Symons	Councillor
Eugene Dettling	Councillor
Randy Ludwar	Councillor

==== Election results ====
The first local election took place on 17 October 2026.

Mayoral
Candidate	Votes	Pct
Matt Taylor	780	65
Tyler Johnsen	312	26
Glenn Innes	106	9

Councillor
Candidate	Votes	Pct
Amy Bydal	698	16
Allison Symons	596	13
Randy Ludwar	563	13
Eugene Dettling	507	11
Keith Mosimann	413	9
Cheryl Snyder	361	8
John Bell	325	7
Shelley Mackenzie	295	7
Melody Walker	285	6
Heather Jackson	273	6
Kris Lee	103	2
