= Skaha Lake =

Lake in British Columbia, Canada

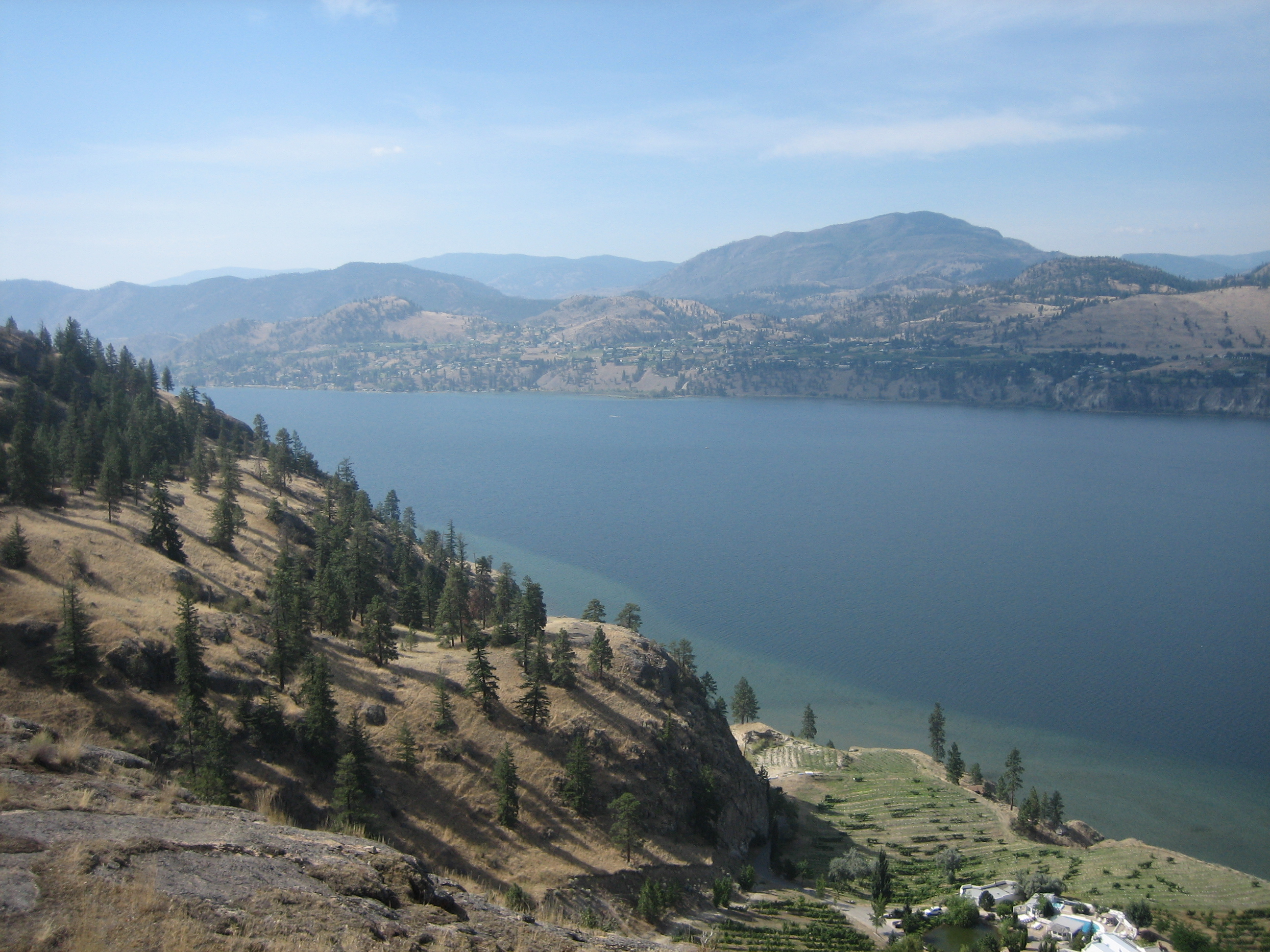

- Location within British Columbia
- Location: British Columbia
- Coordinates: 49°25′20″N 119°35′16″W
- Primary inflows: Okanagan River
- Primary outflows: Okanagan River
- Catchment area: Okanagan Basin
- Basin countries: Canada
- Max. length: 11.8 kilometres (7.3 mi)
- Max. width: 2.2 kilometres (1.4 mi)
- Surface area: 19.6 square kilometres (7.6 sq mi)
- Average depth: 26.6 metres (87 ft)
- Max. depth: 56.7 metres (186 ft)
- Water volume: 0.552 cubic kilometres (0.132 cu mi)
- Residence time: 1.1 years
- Shore length^{1}: 30.7 kilometres (19.1 mi)
- Surface elevation: 339 m (1,112 ft)
- Frozen: February 2014
- Settlements: Penticton, Okanagan Falls
- ^{1} Shore length is not a well-defined measure.

Skaha Lake is a freshwater lake, through which the Okanagan River flows, in the Okanagan region of south central British Columbia. Along the shoreline are Penticton (north), Kaleden (west), and Okanagan Falls (south).

== Name origin ==
The lake was labelled L. du Chien on Anderson's map (1867) and Du Chien L. on Trutch maps (1866 and 1871). Likely named by French Canadian fur traders, the origin is unknown. The translation as Dog Lake was later adopted. When changed to Skaha Lake in 1930, the Shuswap name for dog was mistakenly chosen. The Okanagan meaning of Skaha is horse.

== Ferries ==
In the early years, the Okanagan depended upon water transportation from the rail terminal at Okanagan Landing. Penticton separates Okanagan Lake from Skaha Lake. In 1893, W. J. Snodgrass acquired a new boat, the Jessie, named for his daughter. Plying the Okanagan Falls–Penticton run, this boat burned at the Falls in 1898. In 1894, the Canadian Pacific Railway (CP) built the 17-metre (55 ft) sternwheeler SS Fairview for this run but soon moved to Okanagan Lake, where the vessel burned in 1897. The 27-metre (89 ft) Greenwood, launched in 1897 at Okanagan Landing, burned at the Falls around 1903. In 1899, Snodgrass purchased another boat, the Maude Moore, named after his youngest daughter. In 1905, the vessel relocated to Naramata. In 1910, CP launched the 29-metre (94 ft) Kaleden for the Penticton–Okanagan Falls run. Encountering navigational difficulties on the connecting river, the sternwheeler remained in Okanagan Lake after the initial run.

In 1909, James Ritchie bought the launch Mallard, which he renamed Kaleden for his Kaleden subdivision. For two years, the vessel towed scows carrying building materials. The absence of wharves meant the scows were run up onto the beaches for loading and unloading. In 1911, J.F. Campbell and A.S. Hatfield bought the Kaleden to form the South Okanagan Transportation Company. The next year, they built wharves on the lake at Penticton, Kaleden, and Okanagan Falls. That year, they bought the new 12-metre (40 ft) launch Cygnet and sold the Kaleden. In 1914, the 10-metre (32 ft) Mallard entered service, which included the river route. During 1920–1931, CP's SS York pushed rail barges on the Penticton–Okanagan Falls leg.

The ferry service was subsidized in 1900 and 1910–1922.

== Ecology ==
In the chain of Okanagan lakes, Skaha Lake is south of Okanagan Lake and north of Vaseux Lake. Possessing an approximate 20-square-kilometre (7.7 sq mi) surface area and 55-metre (180 ft) depth, the lake lies as the boundary between the Okanagan dry forests to the northeast and the Cascade Mountains leeward forests to the west. To the south lies the Columbia Plateau shrubland, the only xeric shrubland ecoregion in Canada. The lake hosts a variety of fish including kokanee salmon, rainbow trout, and smallmouth bass. The most recent forming of thicker ice occurred in the mid-1990s and 2014.

== See also ==
- List of lakes of British Columbia
