= Canadian Pacific Railway Lake and River Service =

Division of Canadian Pacific Railway

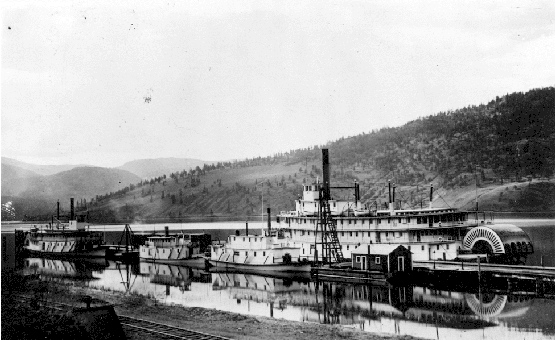
Steamboats Sicamous, Kaleden, York, and Aberdeen at Okanagan Landing, British Columbia, 1916

The Canadian Pacific River Lake and River Service, also known as the British Columbia Lake and River Service, was a division of Canadian Pacific Railway (CPR) which began operating passenger and cargo shipping routes along British Columbia's inland waters during the late 19th century.

== Canadian Pacific Railway Overview ==
In 1884, the Canadian Pacific Railway began purchasing sailing ships as part of a railway supply service on the Great Lakes. Over time, the company began to expand its water transportation to include the Canadian Pacific Railway Upper Lake Service, the Trans-Pacific service, the Canadian Pacific Railway Coast Service, the Trans-Atlantic service, and the British Columbia Lake and River Service.

In the 20th century, the company evolved into a transcontinental railway, operating two transoceanic services which connected Canada with Europe and Asia.

== British Columbia Lake and River Service ==
CPR's expansion in the West included expanding routes. More ships were added to the inland waters fleet. For example, in 1901 CPR built three sternwheelers for use on the Yukon River — the Tyrrell, the Duschesnay, and the Dawson. The investment in more ships was accompanied by increased numbers of CPR workers. Expansion required additional CPR station and terminal structures to be built.

== Inland fleet ==
Vessel name	Launch date	Retirement date	Waterway	Notes
Lytton	July 2, 1890	1904	Arrow Lakes	
Aberdeen	May 22, 1893	December 31, 1919	Okanagan Lake	
Kootenay	April 1897	1919	Arrow Lakes	Abandoned at Crescent Bay, British Columbia
Rossland	November 18, 1897	1916	Arrow Lakes	Sunk at dock on January 25, 1917
Moyie	October 22, 1898	1957	Kootenay Lake	Restored and preserved as a museum ship
Minto	November 19, 1898	1954	Arrow Lakes	Burned in August 1968
Tyrell	1898	—	Yukon River	Sister ship of Moyie
Dawson	1901	—	Yukon River	
York	January 18, 1902	1930s	Okanagan Lake	
Duchesnay	—	—	Yukon River	
Kuskanook	May 5, 1906	December 1931	Kootenay Lake	Converted to a floating hotel in 1932; sank in 1936
Okanagan	July 10, 1907	1934	Okanagan Lake	Scrapped except for the stern saloon, which is preserved with the Sicamous
Kaleden	1910	1916	Skaha and Okanagan Lakes	Scrapped in 1918
Castlegar	1911	1925	Okanagan Lake	
Bonnington	April 24, 1911	1931	Arrow Lakes	Sister ship of Sicamous and Nasookin
Nasookin	April 30, 1913	1947	Kootenay Lake	Dismantled in 1952
Naramata	April 20, 1914	August 1967	Okanagan Lake	Restored with the Sicamous
Sicamous	May 19, 1914	August 1936	Okanagan Lake	Restored and preserved as a museum ship
Kelowna	1920	1956	Okanagan Lake	
Okanagan	1947	May 31, 1972	Okanagan Lake	

- MV Columbia (1948)
- SS Trail
- SS Columbia (1896)
- SS Columbia (1920)

== See also ==
- Canadian Pacific Steamship Company
- Canadian Pacific Railway Coast Service
- Canadian Pacific Railway Upper Lake Service
