= SS York =

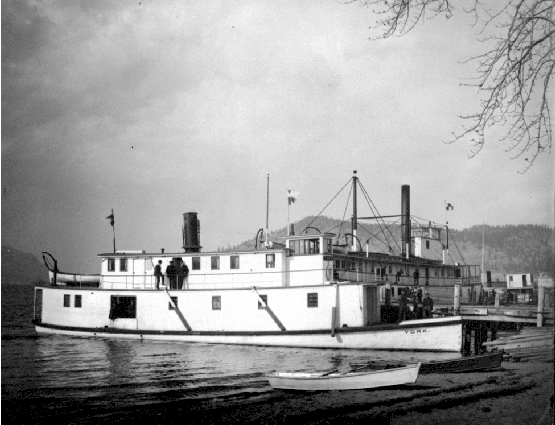
- SS York and SS Aberdeen at Kelowna on Okanagan Lake, 1905

History

Canada
- Owner: Canadian Pacific
- Builder: Bertram Iron Works, Toronto
- Launched: 1902
- Fate: Sold in 1931 and later scrapped

General characteristics
- Type: Steam Tug
- Length: 88 feet (27 m)
- Beam: 16 feet (4.9 m)
- Depth: 4.9 feet (1.5 m)
- Capacity: 134 tons

SS York was a small twin-screw steamer that was used to move passengers and freight on Okanagan Lake and Skaha Lake for the Canadian Pacific Railway Lake and River Service. York was built in 1902 by Bertram Iron Works of Toronto and assembled at Okanagan Landing. She was pre-fabricated with a steel hull and was twin-screw-driven. She was a small vessel in comparison to the many other ships on the lake; York was only 88 by 16 feet (27 by 4.9 metres). York was capable of moving 134 tons in freight and could carry up to 90 passengers.

== Purpose ==
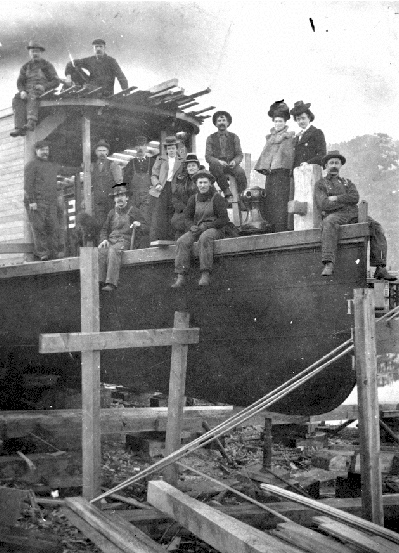
Steamboat York being assembled from prefabricated parts, at Okanagan Landing, BC, in 1901

York was originally built to replace SS Victoria on Trout Lake in the Kootenays; however, SS Aberdeen was in need of a relief vessel. Aberdeen was in dire need of a refitting, hence York was launched on Lake Okanagan in 1902. After Aberdeen returned to Lake Okanagan, York provided way point service(service to location when called in)(online ref.) and worked as a tug boat, carrying cargo that had been clustered on the deck of Aberdeen. Although York was not intended to work as a tugboat, it pushed and pulled barges on Lake Okanagan during fruit season to move perishables to Okanagan Landing so they could be readied for shipment to markets. During the winter when the lake would freeze, York was used to break the ice for larger ships such as Aberdeen.

York worked on Okanagan Lake until 1921, when she was relocated to Skaha Lake (Dog Lake), where York transported passengers up Okanagan River through Penticton. Traveling up and down the channel was tedious and York frequently got stuck in sandbars. York retired when the railway between Penticton and Okanagan falls was complete, after which she was sold to Sid Leary (never put back into service) and eventually dismantled.

== Operation ==
York was launched in 1902 by the Canadian Pacific Railway company. York was only in service for thirty years, from 1902 to 1931. She worked on Lake Okanagan as a tugboat until 1921, when York was moved from Okanagan Lake to Skaha Lake. In 1931, the ship was retired and sold to a mill operator in Nakusp named Sid Leary. While Leary had purchased the vessel with the intention of operating her on Arrow Lakes, York never went back into service. She was later dismantled and used for scrap. Turner, Robert (1995). The Sicamous & The Naramata. Sono Nis Press.

== Officer and crew complement ==
York was a comparatively small vessel, with two decks and a pilot house. The pilot house was the area from which the captain would steer the boat. York was a twin screw vessel, which means that the vessel had two propellers. Additionally, York had a tunnel hull, and the shallow hull allowed her to travel along the channel between Okanagan and Skaha Lakes.

Throughout her career, York had many different people working aboard her. From 1904 to 1907, the captain of the ship was Captain J. Weeks, who had just earned his Master’s Certificate. This was Weeks’ first captain job. He would later go on to become the captain of the Aberdeen and Sicamous. In 1913, according to Canadian Railway and Marine World, York was captained by M. Reid, and her chief engineer was A. McLena.

== Comparison ==
While the York was not as luxurious in accommodations as the other local Canadian Pacific Railway passenger ships, such as the Aberdeen, Okanagan, or Sicamous, she could carry up to 90 passengers and was more efficient than alternative modes of transportation. York did not have as many decks, only what was necessary for her basic operation, and was so was most valued by smaller communities along Skaha Lake.

The modest sternwheeler was too small and slow to replace the rest of the local CPR fleet and lacked the power to compete with the CPR tugboats on Okanagan Lake. However, her relatively small size was advantageous when working on Skaha Lake and traveling up Okanagan River.
