= Canadian National Tug no. 5 =

Tugboat owned and operated by Canadian National Railway on Okanagan Lake

History

Canada
- Owner: Canadian National Railway
- Launched: May 8, 1930

Canadian National Tug no. 5, or CN Tug no. 5, was a tugboat owned and operated by the Canadian National Railway (CNR) company on Okanagan Lake in British Columbia, Canada. Launched on May 8, 1930, the all steel CN no. 5 tug pushed railway barges between Penticton and Okanagan Landing shipyard.

By the 1950s and 1960s, CNR had three Okanagan tugs: MV Pentowna, CN Tug no. 6, and CN Tug no. 5. Only one tug operated at a time, although two would be used in busy times such as harvest season. CNR's competitor on the lake, the Canadian Pacific Railway company, ran three tugs at a time, as well as several sternwheelers and other passenger ships over the years.

Although the date of CN Tug no. 5's retirement is unknown, CNR terminated barge service on February 15th,1973, retiring its last ship, CN Tug no. 6, due to the highways and other modes of transportation that had emerged by that time.
