= Kuskanook =

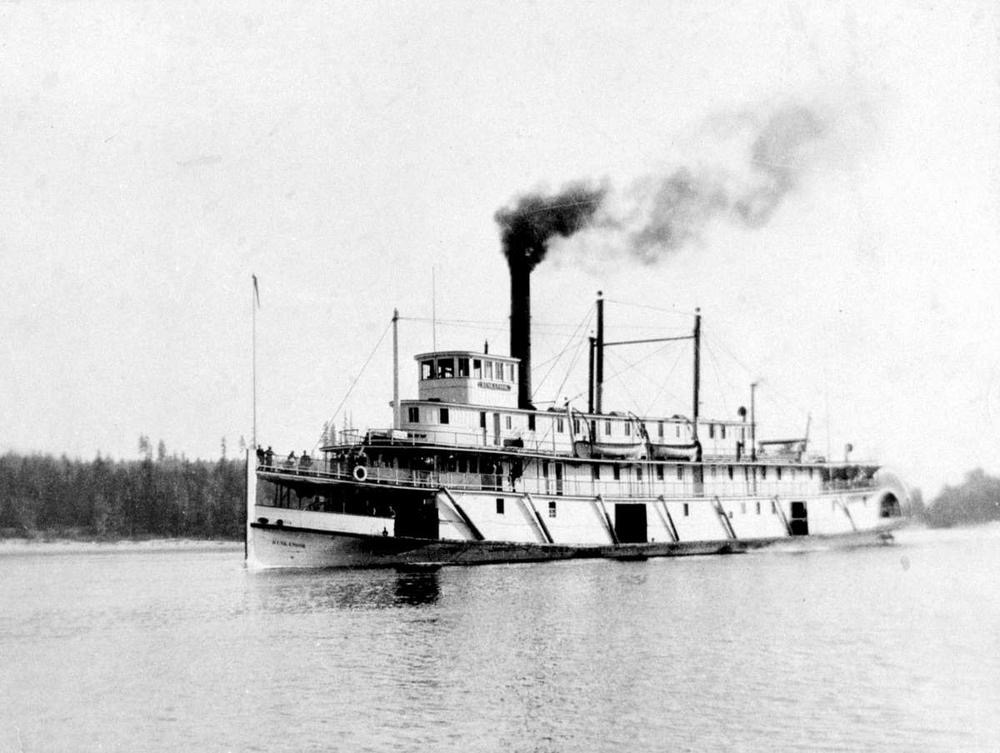
- Kuskanook underway, 1928.

History
- Name: Kuskanook
- Owner: Canadian Pacific Railway
- Operator: CPR River and Lake Service
- Route: Kootenay Lake
- Builder: James M. Bulger
- Cost: $104,145..37
- Launched: May 5, 1906
- Maiden voyage: July 19, 1906
- Out of service: December 1931
- Identification: Canada #121758
- Fate: Converted to floating hotel in 1932 and sank in 1936.

General characteristics
- Type: inland all-purpose.
- Tonnage: 1008 GRT; 548 NRT
- Length: 193.5 ft (58.98 m)
- Beam: 30.9 ft (9.42 m)
- Depth: 7 ft (2.13 m) depth of hold
- Installed power: twin steam engines, horizontally mounted: cylinder bore 22 in (56 cm); stroke 8 ft 3 in (251 cm); 32.3 nominal horsepower; 560 indicated horsepower; boiler generated steam pressure 180 p.s.i.
- Propulsion: stern-wheel
- Capacity: Licensed for 450 passengers; 37 staterooms.
- Crew: Twenty-eight (including seven officers).

Kuskanook was a wooden, stern-wheel driven steamboat that operated on Kootenay Lake, in British Columbia from 1906 to 1931. After being taken out of service, Kuskanook was sold for use as a floating hotel, before sinking in 1936. The vessel name is also seen spelled Kooskanook.

== Route ==
The SS Kuskanook operated on Kootenay Lake, a long glacially carved lake running north to south in the Kootenay region in British Columbia. About halfway along the lake's length, an extension called the Western Arm curved in to Nelson, British Columbia. Near the junction of the Western Arm with the main lake were, on the north of the arm, Balfour, and on the south, Proctor.

North of Balfour, about halfway between the Western Arm and Lardeau, was the town of Kaslo, British Columbia. Just to the east across the lake from the Western Arm, there were landings at Kootenay Bay, Crawford Bay, and Pilot Bay. At the southern end of the lake was Kootenay Landing, which was the furthest point reached by railroad when Kuskanook was built.

== Construction ==
Kuskanook was built by James M. Bulger at Nelson, British Columbia, in 1906 for the Canadian Pacific Railway. No sternwheeler had been built in Nelson since Moyie was launched in 1898. Kuskanook was one of a pair of nearly identical vessels ordered by CPR, the other being Okanagan, which was placed into service in 1907 on Okanagan Lake. Both Kuskanook and Okanagan were based on the design of an earlier vessel, the Arrow Lakes sternwheeler Rossland, down to the style of livery on the bow of the hull.

The vessel cost $104,145.37. The parts had been manufactured in eastern Canada and brought to Nelson to be assembled. The launch on May 5, 1906, was reportedly attended by 3,500 people.

== Dimensions ==
Kuskanook was 193.5 ft (58.98 m), long, measured over the hull, exclusive of the fantail on which the stern-wheel was mounted. The steamer had a beam of 30.9 ft (9.42 m) with a depth of hold of 7 ft (2.13 m) . The Canadian merchant vessel registry number was Canada #121758.

According to one source, Kuskanook had 37 staterooms and was licensed to carry 450 passengers. Another, more detailed source, states that Kuskanook had four dining room tables, with a total seating for 32 persons, with 39 staterooms, and a total passenger capacity of 400. By the mid-1920s Kuskanook could carry eight motor vehicles, mostly on the route between Nelson and the settlement of Kuskonook, just north of Kootenay Landing.

Kuskanook had three decks, the freight and machinery deck, above which were the passenger deck and the texas deck. The wheelhouse was placed just forward of the funnel and stepped back from the forward edge of the Texas deck cabins. The passenger accommodations were the finest yet seen on the Canadian Pacific's sternwheelers.

Kuskanook required a crew of twenty-eight, including seven officers.

== Engineering ==
Kuskanook was driven by twin steam engines that pushed pitman arms to rotate a stern wheel. Each steam engine was horizontally mounted, with a cylinder bore of 22 in (56 cm), and a piston stroke of 8 ft 3 in (251 cm). The steam plant generated 32.3 nominal horsepower; 560 indicated horsepower. The boiler generated steam pressure ad 180 p.s.i.

== Career ==
Kuskanook and other lake steamers were often the only connections the communities along Kootenay Lake had with the outside world. Kuskanook made its initial trip on July 19, 1906, running from Nelson, BC, to Kootenay Landing. Kootenay Landing was the terminus of the Canadian Pacific Railway, which reached the landing from points east through Crowsnest Pass. Increasing demand for lake transport on this run was the main reason for placing Kuskanook into service.

Because of the connection to the Crowsnest railway, the Nelson-Kootenay Landing run was called the “Crow Boat” route. Increasing demand for lake transport on this run was the main reason for placing Kuskanook into service.

Kuskanook was extensively refitted in 1911, and in 1913 was replaced on the Nelson-Kootenay Landing run by the new steel-hulled steamer Naskookin. Kuskanook was refitted in 1914 and placed on the Nelson-Kaslo run. From 1914 to December 31, 1930 Kuskanook was also operated as a relief steamer for Nasookin, and for excursions departing from Nelson. Kuskanook also called at Balfour, where before the First World War, to encourage tourism, the Canadian Pacific had built a 50-room hotel.

== Steam pipe explosion ==
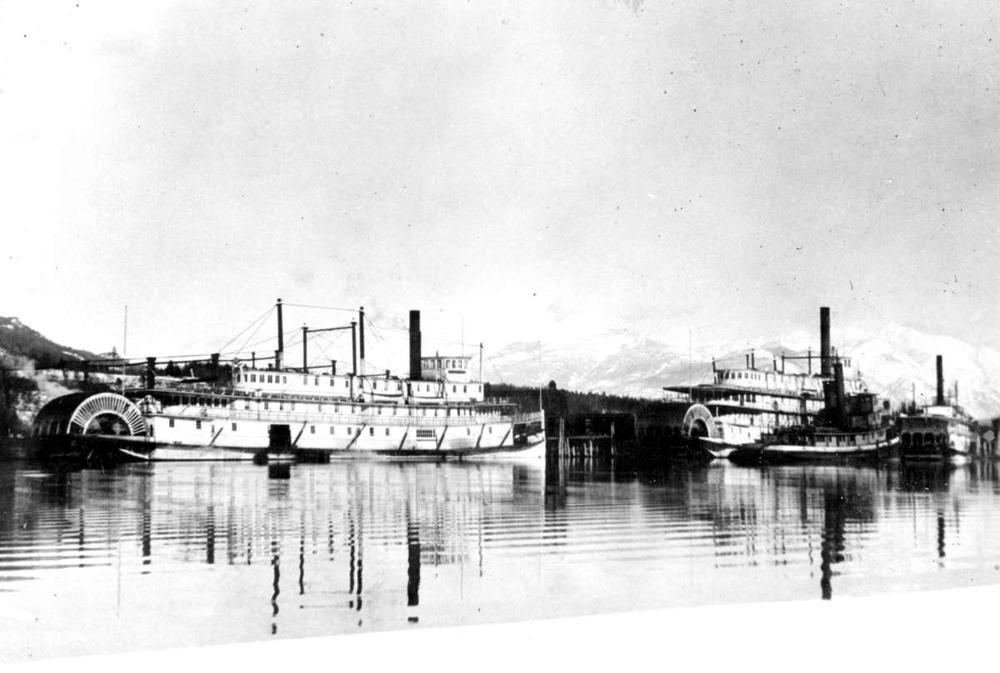
Kuskanook (left) and other lake steamers tied up at Proctor BC in May 1931, after completion of the rail link between Kootenay Landing and Proctor.

In 1925 there was a steam pipe explosion on Kuskanook. A water trap failed in the main steam pipe leading aft to the boiler, and high-pressure steam burst out all through the engine room. Three crew members were scalded to death. This event is remembered as one of the worst accidents in the history of the Canadian Pacific’s Lake and River Service.

== Last years ==
The completion of the B.C. Southern rail link between Kootenay Landing and Proctor eliminated the need for steamboat service between the two points. Road construction had already reduced the demand for steamer transport. In 1931, Kuskanook was worked on the Proctor-Crawford Bay-Lardeau run, and on excursions.

== Disposition ==
In December 1931, Canadian Pacific sold Kuskanook to Arthur D. Pochin. The Canadian Pacific Railway company decided to keep the older Moyie in service because the design of the Kuskanook’s hull made the boat difficult to maintain. Pochin tied Kuskanook up to a wharf at Nelson for use as a floating hotel. The boat was later towed to Kootenay Landing, where it sank in 1936.

== Wreck status ==
The wreck of Kuskanook lies at Kokanee Landing, on Highway 3A, about 30 km east of Nelson. The wreck lies perpendicular to the shore, and can be readily seen during low water.

== Restoration ==
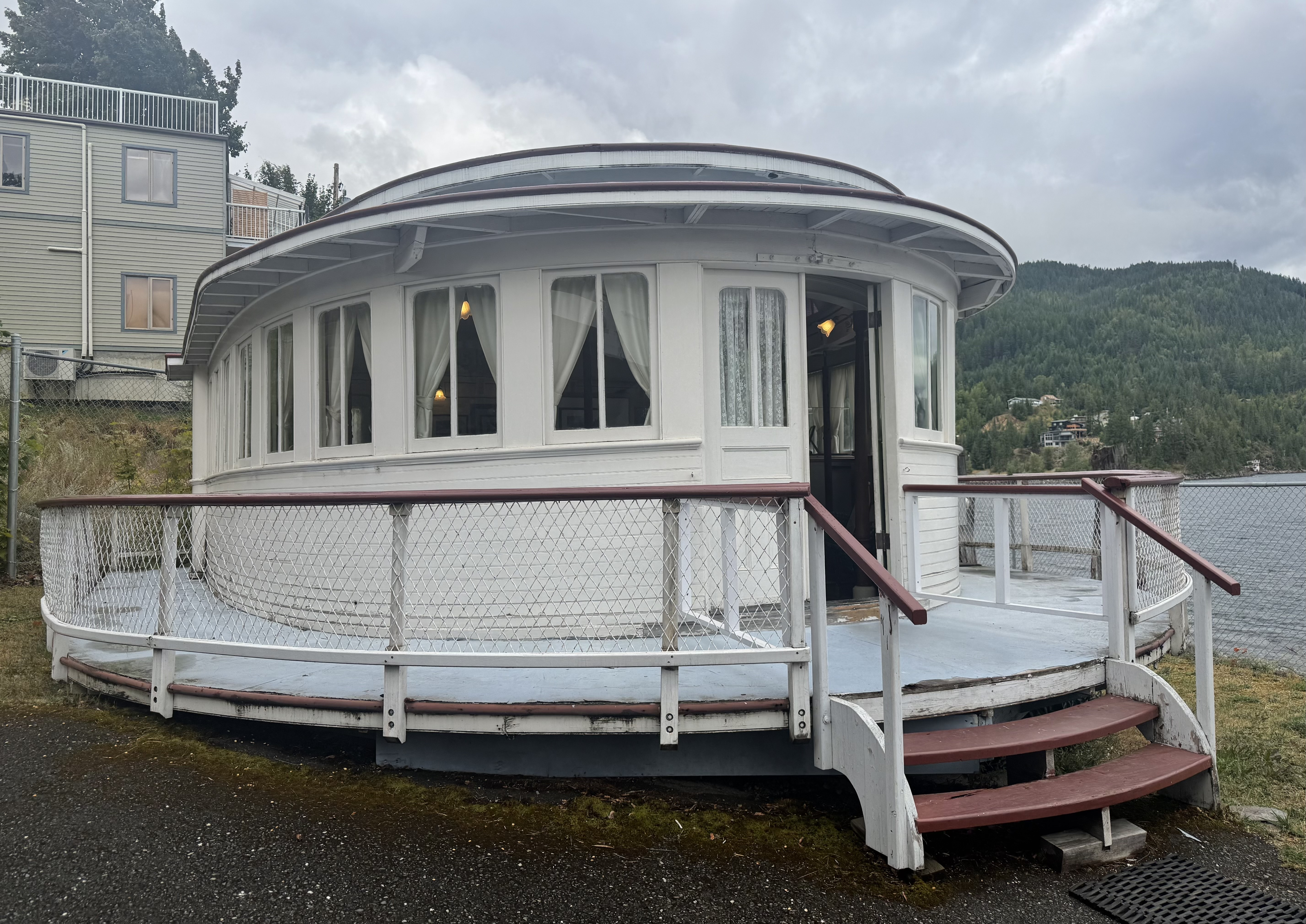
Restored S.S. Kuskanook stern saloon in Kaslo, BC

While much of the ship was lost in the sinking of 1936, the ladies' stern saloon was restored and is open to visitors of the S.S. Moyie in Kaslo, British Columbia. As of 2026, the stern saloon features artifacts from the Kuskanook's construction, service, and restoration, as well as information and photographs of other ships from the Canadian Pacific Railway Lake and River Service.
