= Canadian National Tug no. 6 =

Coordinates: 49°30′09″N 119°36′42″W

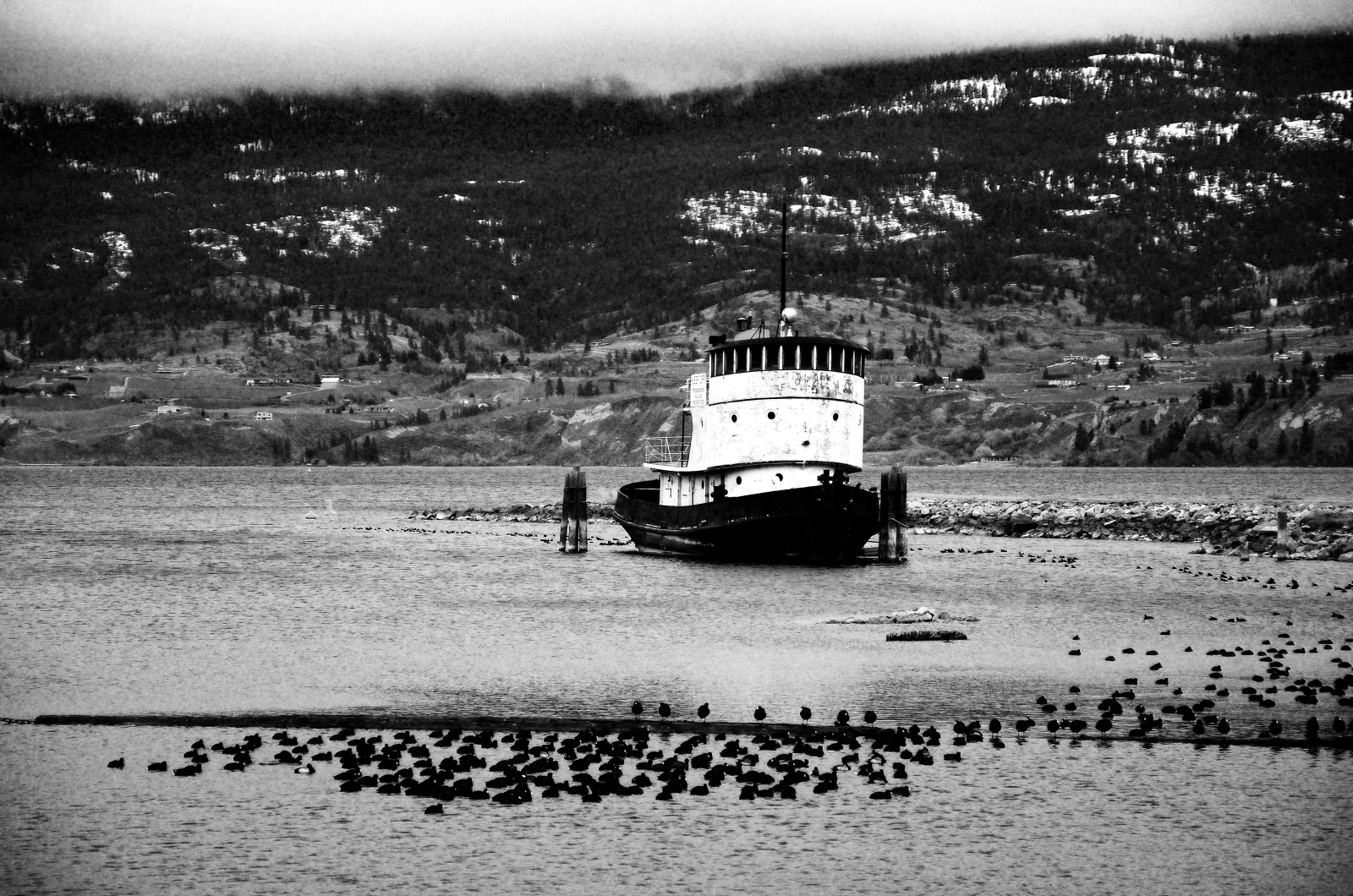
- CN Tug 6

History

Canada
- Owner: Canadian National Railway
- Port of registry: Esquimalt
- Route: Penticton to Kelowna
- Builder: Yarrows Limited, Esquimalt, BC
- Launched: August 6th 1948
- Out of service: February 15th 1973
- Status: Museum ship

General characteristics
- Class & type: Steam Tug
- Tonnage: 158 GT
- Length: 88 ft (27 m)
- Depth: 10 ft 6 in (3.20 m)

Canadian National No. 6 was a diesel-powered tugboat owned and operated by the Canadian National Railway (CNR) company on Okanagan Lake, British Columbia. It was launched in 1948 and transferred railway barges between Penticton and Kelowna. It was retired in 1973, becoming the last of many tugboats to operate on Okanagan Lake. Tug 6 was moved to Penticton in 2007 to rest alongside the SS Naramata and SS Sicamous, two Canadian Pacific Railway (CPR) steamboats, as part of the S.S. Sicamous Inland Marine Museum. The ships are currently being restored by the S.S. Sicamous Restoration Society.

== Canadian National Railway in the Okanagan ==
After a long delay due to World War I, the CNR finally reached Kelowna from Kamloops in September, 1925. This would prove to be one of the most important factors for the end of lake travel in the Okanagan, as more fruit shipments would go through the railway in Kelowna than through the slower steamer route at Okanagan Landing. Passenger service began February 1926 and service on the lake began with the launching of the propeller-driven motor vessel MV Pentowna in June. CNR had transfer slips in Peachland, Westbank, Penticton, and Kelowna, and shared with Canadian Pacific Railroad (CPR) in Summerland and Naramata. The Pentowna transported passengers between Penticton and Kelowna, hence the name. She competed with Sicamous, but was converted to haul freight in 1937 due to her ungainly appearance and problems with vibrations. CNR ended its barge service in 1973 due to the improvement of highways and other modes of transportation.

== Construction ==
Canadian National no. 6 joined CNR's fleet in 1948. While it appears to have been built to meet service demands, some speculate that CN No. 6 was launched because CPR, CNR's competitor, had launched the MV Okanagan the previous year. It was built in 1948 by Yarrows Shipbuilders, Esquimalt, BC and registered number 190311. CN No. 6 is an all-steel tugboat with an eight-cylinder, turbo-charged diesel engine. It has a single blade rudder and a nominal horsepower of 575. It is 88 feet long, 22 feet wide, and 10 feet, 6 inches deep with a gross tonnage of 158 tons. There are three double cabins and a storage room on board.

== Service ==
Like most other tugboats on Okanagan Lake, CN No. 6 transported fruit and other freight. It was used to push and pull barges loaded with railcars full of fruit from Osoyoos, Penticton, Naramata, Summerland, Peachland, Gellatly's Point, and Westbank to the rail yard at Kelowna, where they were then loaded onto the trains to Vancouver to be shipped across Canada.

=== Crew ===
The crew upon the retirement of CN No. 6 was as follows: Skipper: Ron Giggey Chief engineer: Ben Bounds Second engineer: Dick Sieward Cook: Harry Heyworth Mates: Ike Klassen, Harry Bailey, Inar Bozarth, Ken Marshall, Frank Hawkey

== Retirement and restoration ==
CPR stopped its barge service in 1972, and CNR retired its two remaining vessels, Pentowna and CN No. 6, the following year due to the new highways and other forms of transportation. Thus, CN No. 6 was the last tugboat to operate on Okanagan Lake. It was sold to Fintry Estates in 1973, along with Okanagan, while Pentowna was moved to the Peachland waterfront. Thirteen years later, the city of Kelowna bought CN No. 6 from its owner at the time, Angela Percy, for CAD$35 000. The city was intending to make it a museum, but decided to transfer the ship to the S.S. Sicamous Restoration Society in 2007 to restore it and to expand and promote the Sicamous Inland Marine Heritage Park. CN No. 6 was moved to Penticton on June 16, 2007, to rest alongside Sicamous and Naramata, becoming the only ship at Heritage Park to have been fueled by diesel instead of coal. Restoration began with the construction of a bridge from the park to the floating tug. Cleaning and painting followed. Current plans include hopes to open CN No. 6 for tours in the future.
