= SS Aberdeen (1893) =

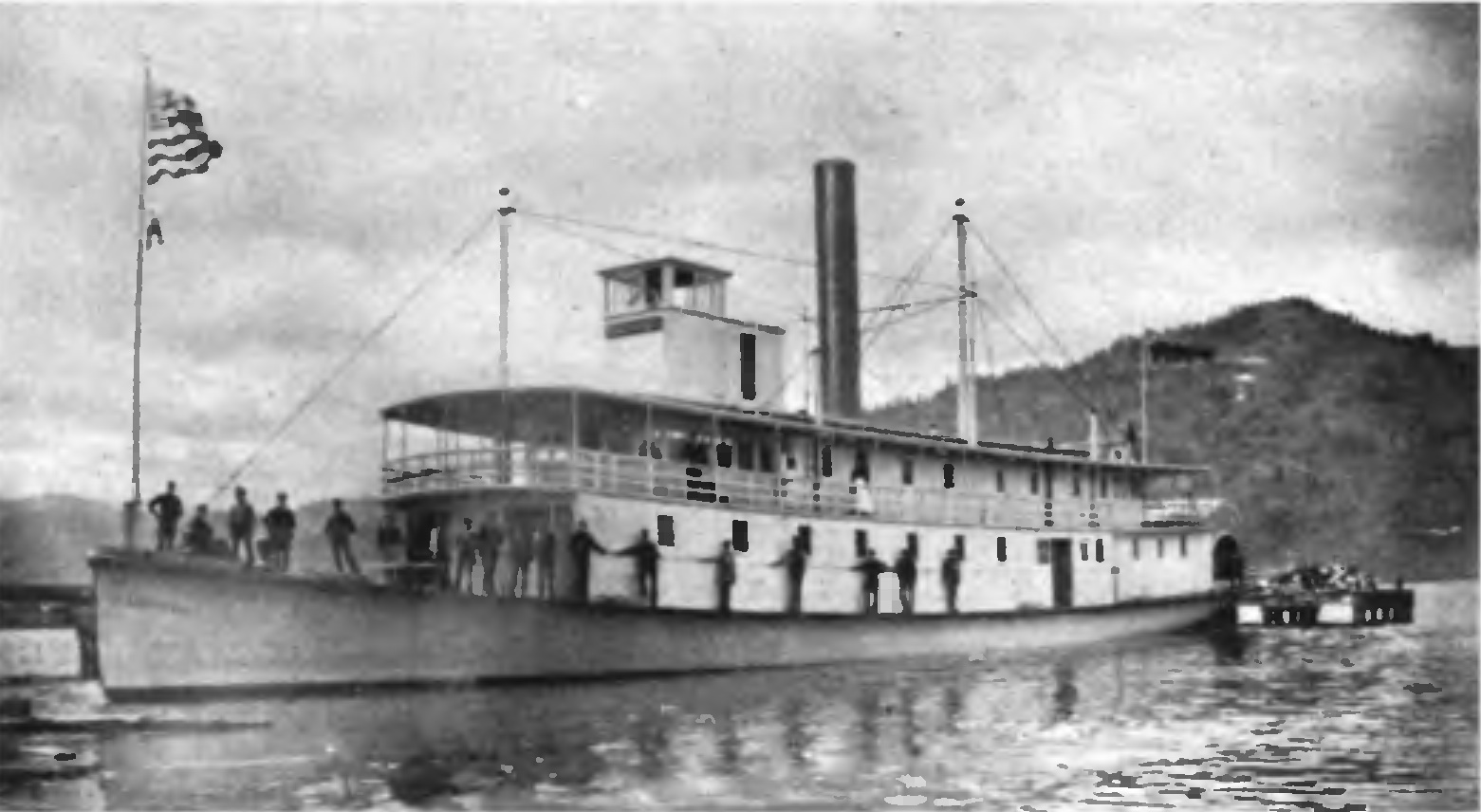
- SS Aberdeen on Okanagan Lake, 1895

History

Canada
- Name: Aberdeen
- Namesake: John Hamilton-Gordon, 7th Earl of Aberdeen (1870-1916) and Governor General of Canada (1893-1898)
- Owner: Canadian Pacific Railway
- Route: Penticton to Okanagan Landing
- Builder: B.C. Iron Works and CPR
- Launched: May 22, 1893
- In service: 1893
- Out of service: December 31, 1919
- Fate: Hull sold for $35

General characteristics
- Class & type: Sternwheeler
- Tonnage: 544.0
- Length: 146.2 feet (44.6 m)
- Beam: 29.9 feet (9.1 m)
- Depth: 6.8 feet (2.1 m)

SS Aberdeen was a steamship commissioned by Canadian Pacific Railway company for the Canadian Pacific Lake and River Service on Okanagan Lake. It was the first CPR steamship on Okanagan Lake and carried passengers and cargo from Okanagan Landing to Penticton from 1893 to 1919. Aberdeen was the first sternwheeler to connect many of the shoreside communities along Okanagan Lake, creating a new era in the Okanagan Valley and greatly aiding the economy and settlement of interior British Columbia.

== Construction ==
Aberdeen was commissioned by the Canadian Pacific Railway (CPR) to extend the Shuswap and Okanagan Railway line from Okanagan Landing to Penticton. President William Cornelius Van Horne authorized construction in 1892. The ship was designed by the Danish shipbuilder John F. Steffen, while master builder Edwin G. McKay supervised the building of the steamer. Horace Campbell of Portland, Oregon designed the engines, which were built at B.C. Iron Works. CPR built the boiler in Montreal. Aberdeen burned wood until 1902, when she was converted to a coal burner.

A shipyard named Okanagan Landing was constructed near Vernon to build and maintain Aberdeen. Okanagan Landing was later used for the construction and maintenance of many ships, including the SS Okanagan, SS Naramata, and Sicamous. The construction of Aberdeen also provided work for local businesses, such as those supplying moulding, lumber, and fittings.

Aberdeen was a sternwheeler of classic western design, and called the “Finest inland steamer set afloat in the Northwest in 1893". She measured 146.2 by 29.9 feet (44.6 by 9.1 m) and her depth of hold was 6.8 feet (2.1 m). Her passenger capacity was 250 and her cargo deck capacity was 200 tons (180 tonnes).

The first deck held the boiler, machinery, freight, and crew’s quarters for eight men. At the front of the freight deck was a staircase leading to the saloon deck, which had a smoking room in front, purser’s office aft, and a spare room. The dining saloon was in the center with 11 staterooms lining both sides. The stewardess’ room, pantry, and ladies’ toilet and cabins were also on the saloon deck. However, the cabins were not completed when Aberdeen was launched. The woodwork needed a year to shrink fully before the last coat of paint and gilt stripping could be applied. Officers’ quarters were behind the pilothouse.

== Crew ==
The first captain of Aberdeen was Captain J. Foster, former mate of the coaster liner Islander. R. Williams was first mate, H. Fawcett was purser, and W.B. Couson was first engineer. A notable captain was Captain Joseph Weeks, who first joined Aberdeen's crew as a deckhand. He later went on to command SS York and Aberdeen before becoming the last captain of Sicamous.

== Name ==
Aberdeen was named after John Campbell Gordon, 7th Earl of Aberdeen. He owned the large Coldstream Ranch near Vernon and was appointed Governor General of Canada in 1893.

== Service ==
Aberdeen was launched on May 22, 1893, with crowds arriving on foot or by train to Okanagan Landing to participate in the festivities. Farmers, settlers, and merchants were pleased to have a first-class, modern steam vessel to connect the Okanagan for the first time. Before Aberdeen, only primitive transportation was provided by individuals on Okanagan Lake. The operations were small, unreliable and insufficient to promote the development of the region. Aberdeen greatly improved service for residents and held a virtual monopoly on the lake as there were no comparable vessels to compete with her.

She made round trips from Penticton to Okanagan Landing three times a week, with service being suspended between mid-January to March, when the steamer Penticton would fill in twice a week. In later years, this was done by SS Fairview and Greenwood. Until the construction of Okanagan in 1907, Aberdeen ran south on Mondays, Wednesdays, and Fridays, leaving Okanagan Landing in the morning and arriving in Penticton by the afternoon. She ran from Penticton to Okanagan Landing on Tuesdays, Thursdays, and Saturdays.

In the beginning, wharves were primitive and there were few traveller amenities, but improvements were made and business increased. Mining developments in the 1890s meant large volumes of traffic. The Okanagan had a booming fruit industry by the early 1900s and steamers were essential for exportations. York was launched in 1902 as relief steamer for Aberdeen. By 1904, it was becoming clear that the ageing Aberdeen could not handle the traffic on the lake. Okanagan was launched in 1907 and replaced Aberdeen, freeing her for freight. Aberdeen was retired in 1916 and her hull was sold for $35.

== See also ==
- Steamboats of Lake Okanagan
