= Nasookin =

Canadian steamboat

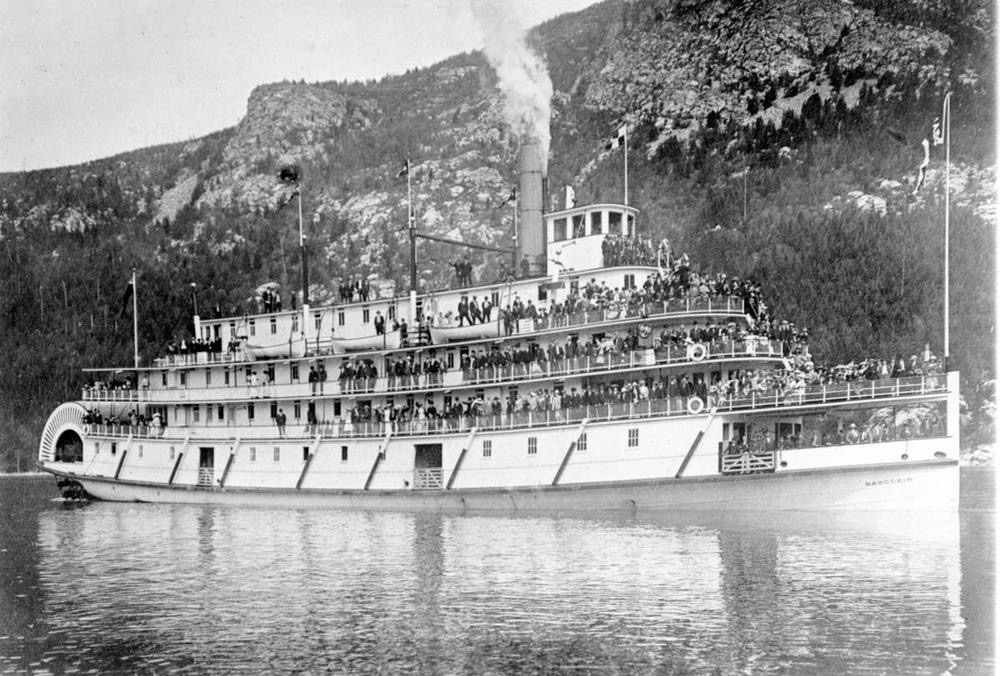
- First passenger carrying trip of Nasookin, May 25, 1913.

History
- Name: Nasookin
- Owner: Canadian Pacific Railway; Government of British Columbia
- Operator: River and Lake Service
- Cost: $200,000
- Launched: April 30, 1913, at Nelson, BC
- Out of service: 1947
- Identification: Canada 133885
- Fate: Dismantled in 1952

General characteristics
- Tonnage: 1869 GT; 1035 NT
- Length: 200 ft (61 m) over hull exclusive of fantail; 236 ft (72 m) LOA
- Beam: 40 ft (12 m) exclusive of guards
- Draft: 5 ft (1.5 m)
- Depth: 8 ft (2.4 m) depth of hold
- Decks: four (freight, passenger, saloon, and texas )
- Installed power: twin compound steam engines, horizontally mounted: cylinder bores 16 in (41 cm) (high pressure) and 34 in (86 cm) (low pressure; stroke 6 ft 6 in (198 cm)); steam pressure 200 psi
- Propulsion: stern-wheel
- Speed: 22 miles (35 km) per hour
- Capacity: Licensed for 550 passengers

Nasookin was a sternwheel-driven steamboat that operated on Kootenay Lake in British Columbia from 1913 to 1947. Nasookin was one of the largest inland steam vessels ever to operate in British Columbia and the Columbia River and its tributaries. Nasookin became surplus to its original owner, the Canadian Pacific Railway, and was transferred to the British Columbia Provincial government which used it as an auto ferry until 1947. Negligent mooring of the steamer in 1948 led to irreparable damage to its hull, and it was later scrapped. Portions of the upper works were salvaged and used as a house.

== Name ==
The name Nasookin was reported to mean “Big Chief.” The name was selected by CPR in Montreal on the recommendation of A.D. Wheeler, of Ainsworth, to continue the plan of using First Nations names for all of its steamers on the lake.

== Design ==
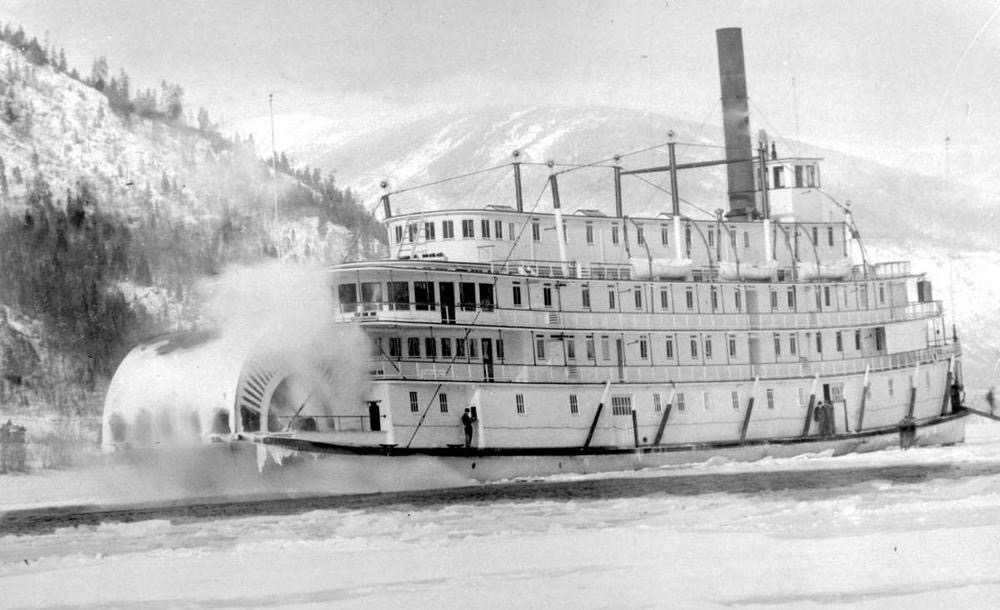
Nasookin in ice, March 1929.

Nasookin was the sister ship of two other vessels, Bonnington operating on the Arrow Lakes and Sicamous, on Okanagan Lake. Nasookin was the second to be built, with Bonnington having been the first. Nasookin was nearly identical to Bonnington. Nasookin had a steel deck, whereas that of Bonnington’s was of wood. The hull design was slightly different on Nasookin and its engines were more powerful.

=== Main deck ===
Nasookin had four decks. The main deck housed the boiler and the engines, and had space for cargo. The crew accommodations were also on the main deck. On the left side of the main deck was a galley, a pantry, the crew’s mess, cold storage, and cabins for the cook. On the right side was a bathroom, lavatory, storeroom, waiter’s room, express room, and mail room. Also on the main deck were six cabins with bunks for 12 men.

=== Saloon deck ===
Next above the main deck was the saloon deck, which was devoted almost entirely to passenger accommodations. In the center of the saloon deck was a dining room which could seat 60 people at its six main tables. The ceiling of the dining room extended through the next deck, creating an impressive effect, similar to ocean-going or coastal steamships of the time.

Forward of the dining room on the left side was the steward’s office and room, and on the right side was the purser’s office. There were also 14 staterooms on the saloon deck, and, in the forward area, a smoking room with curved sides and large windows. At the rear of the saloon deck was the ladies’ saloon.

=== Gallery deck ===
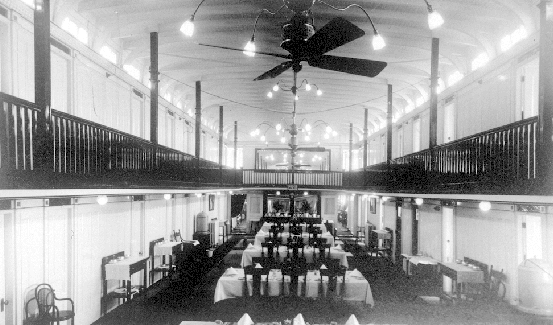
Interior of gallery deck overlooking salon deck on Bonnington, sister ship of Nasookin.

Above the saloon deck was the gallery deck, so named because of the gallery around the interior of the deck that overlooked the dining room on the saloon deck. The gallery deck had 25 three-berth staterooms. Forward on the gallery deck was the ladies’ observation lounge, while to the rear on this deck was another men's smoking room. The chief engineer also had a cabin on the gallery deck.

=== Texas deck and pilot house ===
Above the saloon deck was the texas deck, so named because of a cabin structure, called a texas that was built on this deck. The texas housed a further 18 three-berth staterooms, as well as cabins for the captain and officers, and a room for the boat's watchman. The pilot house was located on top of the texas, just above the captain's cabin.

== Construction ==
The steel hull of Nasookin was built by the Western Drydock and Shipbuilding Company of Port Arthur, Ontario. The hull was then disassembled for shipment by rail to British Columbia to be reassembled for service on Kootenay Lake.

Assembly of Nasookin began in the fall of 1912 at the CPR shipyard at Nelson, British Columbia. Several hundred men were reported to be at work on the vessel. Construction was supervised by the chief engineer of the CPR's Lake and River Service, David Stephens. James M. Bulger master shipbuilder, and J. French, yard foreman, also managed the work.

== Dimensions ==
When built, Nasookin was the largest sternwheeler in British Columbia and the largest sternwheeler north of San Francisco. Nasookin was reported to have been 200 ft (61 m) long, exclusive of the extension of the main deck over the stern, called the “fantail”, on which the stern-wheel was mounted. Including the fantail, the length overall was 236 ft (72 m).

The beam was 39 ft (12 m), which would have been exclusive of the long protective timbers running alongside the top of the hull, called guards. Nasookin was projected to draw about 5 feet of water.

From the top of the pilot house to the waterline was about 50 feet. Overall size of Nasookin was 1869 gross tons 1035 net tons, with ton in this case being a measure of volume and not weight. Nasookin was reported to have cost $200,000 to build. Nasookin was capable of carrying 550 passengers on day trips, with overnight accommodations for 170.

== Engineering ==
Nasookin was propelled by a stern-wheel turned by twin compound horizontally mounted steam engines, each with cylinder bores 16 in (41 cm) (high pressure) and 34 in (86 cm) (low pressure) and a piston stroke of 6 ft 6 in (198 cm). Another source reports slightly larger piston bore diameters. The boilers produced steam at a pressure of 200 lbs P.S.I. The boilers were coal-fired.

According to one source, the stern-wheel shaft was 14 ft 6 in (442 cm), with a 5 in (13 cm) core. A contemporaneous source reported the stern-wheel was about 20 feet wide, with a diameter of 24 feet. Each paddle blade, called a “bucket” was 25 inches wide. Electricity for the six hundred 16 candle power lights on board was produced by a 25 watt dynamo.

Before launching, Nasookin was expected to be able to reach a speed of 22 miles (35 km) per hour, 2 miles (3.2 km) an hour faster than Bonnington, on the Arrow Lakes.

== Launch and trial run ==
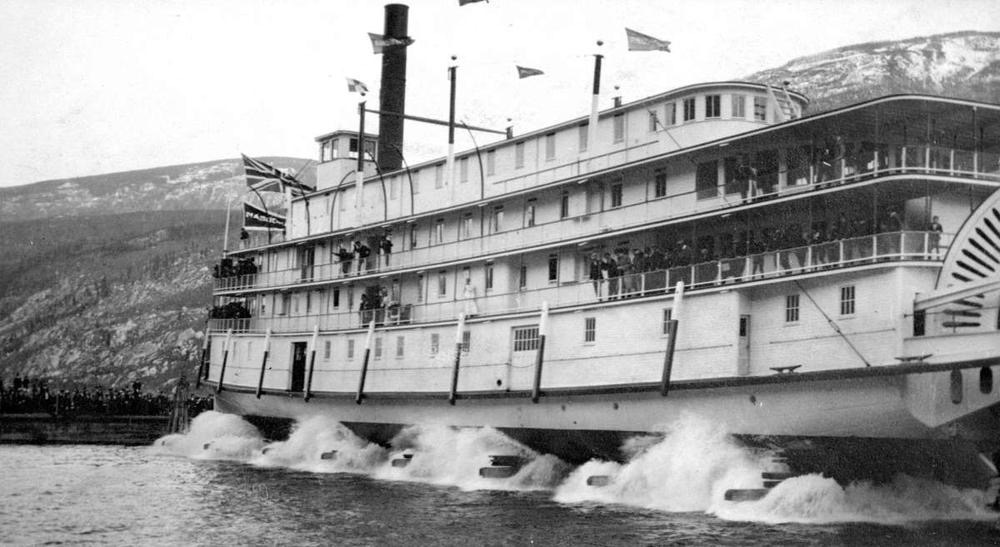
Launch of Nasookin, April 30, 1913.

Nasookin was launched on April 30, 1913, before a crowd estimated at 2,000 people. The vessel was decorated with flags and bunting. Barges were moored alongside the launch site so that more people could see the launch. The steam tug Ymir and the sternwheeler Nelson also carried sightseers. The launch went well and the new steamer would be ready to run in a week or so, because much of the finish work had already been completed.

Nasookin made its trial run on May 4, 1913, under Captain McKinnon, with David Stephens acting as chief engineer. The vessel went up the west arm of Kootenay Lake to Procter and then into the main lake. The trip was a success.

The formal maiden run of Nasookin was taken on Victoria Day, May 25, 1913, with the boat embarking its full licensed passenger capacity of 550 persons.

== Career ==
The CPR intended Nasookin to be able to handle the growing local business on Kootenay Lake as well as tourism which CPR was in the process of developing. CPR intended that at least in the summer months when traffic was at its busiest, that Nasookin replace Kuskanook on the route on the lake between Procter and Kootenay Landing, British Columbia. By August 1913, Nasookin was running between Nelson and Kootenay Landing, connecting at each point with CPR trains. J.V. Murphy was the CPR's district passenger agent in Nelson, B.C.

In September 1913, CPR offered “reduced rates” to the Spokane Interstate Fair, to be held from September 15 to September 21, in Spokane, Washington. Fare from Greenwood would be $15.15. Fare from Phoenix would be a little bit more, $15.30.

In May 1915, Nasookin was reported to be ready to return to service “as soon as traffic warrants it.” On April 1, 1916, Nasookin resumed its route on the West Arm of Kootenay Lake after having been taken out of service for months because of ice on the lake. On Sunday, July 14, 1929, the town of Creston, BC had the “biggest auto tourist day” so far that year, when Nasookin loaded 26 automobiles headed west at Kuskanook, BC.

== Auto ferry ==
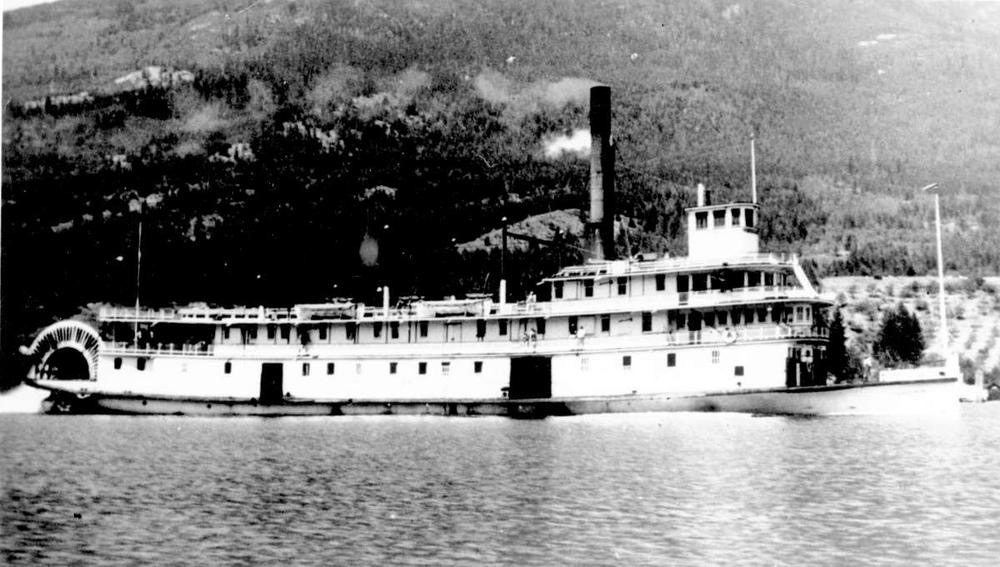
Nasookin with decks cut down in use as an auto ferry.

By 1931, CPR had no further use for Nasookin. A railway had been completed from Kootenay Landing to Nelson, and steamboat service between the two points was no longer required.

CPR leased Nasookin to the government of British Columbia, to be used to carry motor vehicles from Frasers Landing, which was located near Proctor, on the north side of the west arm of the lake, to Gray Creek on Crawford Bay. At first, the only modification to Nasookin was to remove the extension of the passenger deck from the house to the bow, to permit larger vehicles such as buses to be carried.

First the province leased Nasookin, and then, in 1933, purchased the vessel outright. The upper decks of Nasookin had made the steamer difficult to handle in a cross wind, so it was taken to Nelson and extensively rebuilt, with the cabins on the texas deck completely removed, and the pilot house placed on top of the truncated gallery deck. The steamer became less attractive but more functional, and was able to run for another 15 years.

== Disposition ==
Nasookin was replaced by a twin-propeller ferry in 1947. Nasookin was then sold to Norman C. Stibbs, who then transferred the steamer to the Navy League of Canada for use as a training vessel. In 1948, there were record high levels on Kootenay Lake, and Nasookin broke free from its moorings. The steamer was tied up, but no one paid much care to its location. A concrete wall, not visible under the high water, was under Nasookin’s hull, and when the water level fell, the sternwheeler settled on the wall, cracking the hull beyond repair.

In 1950, Nasookin was sold to Earle Cutler, who stripped the parts out of the steamer. The hull was towed away in 1954. Portions of the upper works were made into a house.
