= Bonnington (sternwheeler) =

Coordinates: 50.741°N 117.734°W

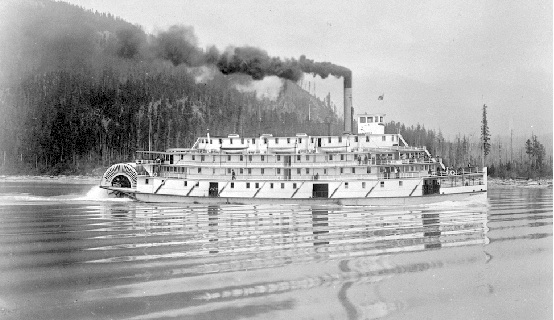
- Bonnington

History

Canada
- Name: Bonnington
- Owner: Canadian Pacific Railway
- Operator: Canadian Pacific Railway Lake and River Service
- Route: Arrow Lakes
- Builder: James M. Bulger
- Cost: $161,055
- Laid down: November 1910 (assembly of pre-manufactured components began)
- Launched: 24 April 1911, at Nakusp, BC
- Maiden voyage: 10 May 1911
- In service: 1911
- Out of service: 1931
- Identification: CAN 130555
- Fate: Partially dismantled in the 1950s and later sunk
- Notes: Near twin of steamers Nasookin and Sicamous

General characteristics
- Type: Inland shallow-draft boat passenger/freighter, steel hull, wood house
- Tonnage: 1663 gross; 955 net; later: 1700 gross; 1010 net
- Length: 202.5 ft (62 m)
- Beam: 39.1 ft (12 m)
- Draft: 3.5 ft (1 m)
- Depth: 7.5 ft (2 m) depth of hold
- Decks: four (main, saloon, gallery, texas)
- Ice class: steel hull allowed some ice navigation
- Installed power: coal-fired boiler generating steam pressure at 200 lbs/p.s.i, compound steam engines, bore: 16" high pressure/34" low pressure, each with 96" stroke, 98 hp (73 kW) nominal
- Propulsion: sternwheel
- Speed: 16 miles per hour (maximum)
- Capacity: 57 staterooms; licensed to carry 400 passengers
- Crew: 25 to 30

SS Bonnington was a sternwheel steamboat that ran on the Arrow Lakes in British Columbia from 1911 to 1931. SS Bonnington and her two sisterships, the SS Sicamous and SS Nasookin, were the largest sternwheelers ever built in British Columbia by the Canadian Pacific Railway Lake and River Service. Bonnington was partially dismantled in the 1950s, and later sank, making the vessel the largest freshwater wreck site in British Columbia.

== Design and construction ==
=== Need for construction ===
Steam navigation on the inland lakes of British Columbia was dominated by the River and Lake Service of the Canadian Pacific Railway. Since the early 1890s the River and Lake Service had maintained steamboat service on Okanagan, Arrow and Kootenay lakes. By 1910, with the important exceptions of the composite-hulled Moyie on Kootenay Lake and Minto on the Arrow Lakes, the wooden-hulled steamers of the River and Lake Service were starting to wear out and would need replacement. This time however the hulls of the replacements would be made of steel, although the cabins would be built of wood. It was also planned to greatly increase the passenger capacity of the vessels. The goal was to develop the entire Kootenay and Arrow Lakes area into a major tourist destination, as the C.P.R. had done with Banff

=== Sister Ships ===
Bonnington was a near twin of the steamers Naskookin and Sicamous built shortly afterwards on Kootenay and Okanagan lakes respectively. Unusual for a sternwheeler, Bonnington was equipped with compound steam engines, which were manufactured by Polson Iron Works of Toronto, Ontario. The vessel's steel hull was also manufactured by Polson Iron Works and was then shipped in pieces to Nakusp where it was assembled at the Bulger shipyard and the upper works, built of wood, were constructed.

=== Design innovations ===
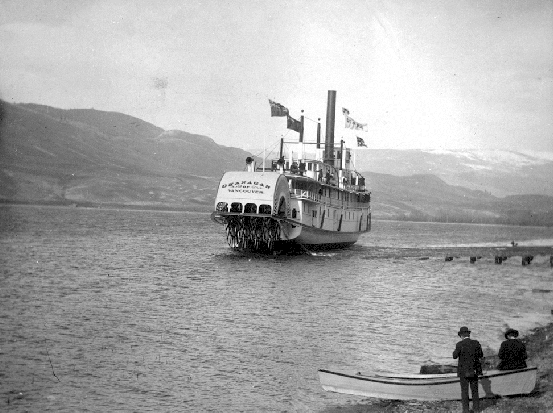
Launching of Bonnington at Nakusp, BC, April 1911

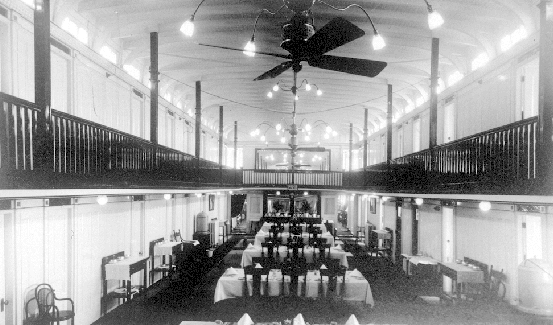
Dining salon on Bonnington

While there were many variations, a typical steamer of the inland lakes, and in fact of most of British Columbia and the Pacific Northwest, had three decks.

- The main deck, sometimes called the freight or weather deck, carried the boiler, and the engines for the vessel, as well as crew quarters, the kitchen, and space for freight.
- The saloon or passenger deck, typically had a large common area overlooking the bow. Down the middle of the cabin would be the saloon, which was not a bar but a large dining room. Passenger cabins flanked the saloon all the way to the stern, where there would generally be another large common area. Typically one common area would be called the "ladies saloon" while the other would be the smoking saloon, which by customs of the time meant men only.
- The Texas or hurricane deck, was the topmost deck on the typical steamer. The ship's lifeboats would be placed on this deck. On this deck sometimes a third set of cabins would be placed, called the "texas". Generally the Texas was reserved for cabins of the ship's officers, but sometimes, as in the case of Minto the Texas would include passenger cabins.
- The pilot house, where the ship's wheel was located, was usually placed either in front of or on top of the Texas. The advantage of having the pilot house on top of the Texas was improved visibility, while the disadvantage was increased windage.

Bonnington would break the three-deck pattern and, with Nasookin and Sicamous become the only sternwheel steamer with four decks to run in the Pacific Northwest. These three vessels were built with deck called the "gallery" deck above the saloon and below the Texas deck. This was called the "gallery" deck because the cabins on it opened onto a walk or gallery that overlooked the dining room on the saloon deck below. This created high ceiling in the dining room and was a dramatic architectural effect.

The locomotive-type boiler installed in Bonnington was 9.0 ft (3 m) in diameter and 28.3 ft (9 m) long. This was probably the largest boiler of this type ever to have been built in Canada up to that time. The capacity of boilers to generate steam was measured by the grate area, meaning the size of the fire-box or fuel burning part of the boiler, and the heating surface, which is the total area heated by the fire available to generate steam. In the case of Bonnington the grate area of the boiler was over 70 square feet (6.5 m^{2}) and the heating surface was 2,750 feet (840 m). The boiler consumed up to 3,800 pounds of fuel in an hour, which over the approximately 130 miles (210 km) from Arrowhead to Robson meant a fuel consumption of approximately 15 tons of coal. As with the boiler, the engines for Bonnington were also the largest ever built for a sternwheeler in Canada.

The components of the hull were shipped out from Ontario in 19 freight cars. The hull itself was divided into 20 watertight compartments, and to allow as shallow a draft as possible, the bottom of the hull was almost perfectly flat. The compound steam engines were highly efficient and had been employed in many ships, but they had never been used before on a sternwheeler. Bonnington's sternwheel was 25.0 ft (8 m) in diameter and had 20 buckets, which was the steamboat word for paddles.

There were 62 staterooms on the steamer, all with electric light and steam heat. The dining room was 71.0 ft (22 m) long and seated 60 people. In addition to the ladies cabin and the smoking room, Bonnington had two observation rooms on the gallery deck, one forward and one aft. There was another lounge and officers and passenger cabins on the Texas deck. Overall Bonnington was regarded as a luxurious vessel and the apex of the steamboat era of travel in British Columbia.

== Arrow Lakes service ==
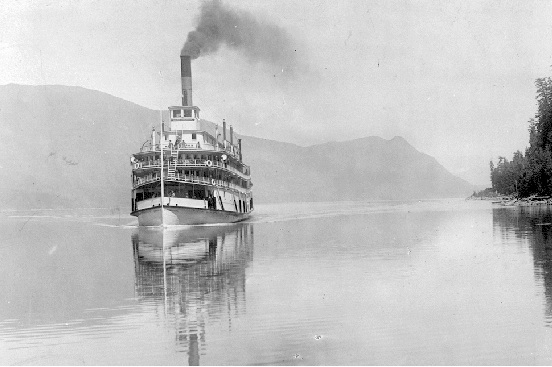
Bonnington on Arrow Lakes

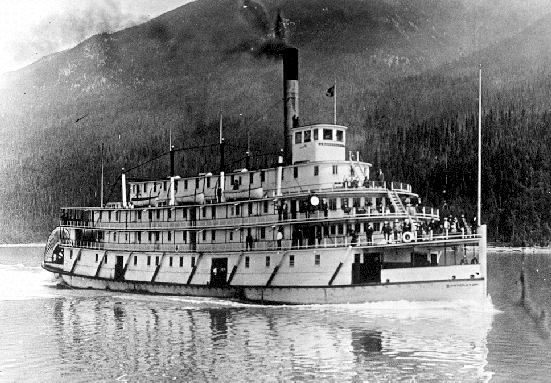
Bonnington under way on Arrow Lakes

Bonnington ran on the Arrow Lakes route from Arrowhead to Robson West during the summer seasons from 1911 to 1931. The summer season was the busiest time for tourism and other traffic, and ran from approximately 15 May to 30 September of each year. While Bonnington was big, she was not particularly fast, and the C.P.R.'s older all-wooden sternwheeler Rossland could easily outrun her. The size of Bonnington was not always an operating advantage, as her huge superstructure made her difficult to handle in a crosswind. Also, while her steel hull gave her ice resistance that wooden-hulled vessels lacked, the winter was also a time of low water in the Narrows that separated the upper and lower Arrow Lakes. While Bonnington had a shallow draft for a vessel her size, only 3.5 ft (1 m) deep, that was still too much to negotiate narrows at low water, so Bonnington could not traverse the length of the lakes during the winter months of low water.

== Decline of steamboat business ==
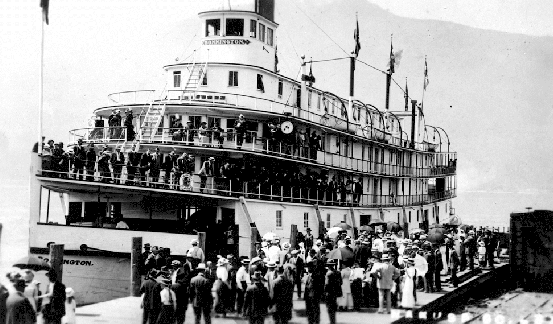
Bonnington loading troops at Nakusp 1915

The years of World War I (1914–1918) were hard on the steamboats, as the young men that would otherwise man them or work at businesses in the area volunteered for military service, and travel and tourism fell off in general. Bonnington and other steamers did carry troops recruited locally to military training, but this work could not make up for the general decline in business. Bonnington was to be the last sternwheeler built on the Arrow Lakes. As railroads and roads entered the area, and people moved to the cities, business went into decline, so that by 1930, there were only three vessels running passenger service on the Arrow Lakes, the Bonnington, the Minto and the all-purpose propeller steamboat Columbia.

== Withdrawn from Canadian Pacific Railway service ==
Bonnington with her large crew and high expenses, could not survive the Great Depression, which caused tourist traffic to fall off considerably. Bonnington withdrawn from service after the season of 1931, and laid up at Nakusp, where the vessel remained for a long time and slowly deteriorated.

== Later years ==
Bonnington was able to serve as a spare parts source for the other vessels of her class, her boiler and smokestack being later installed in the sistership Nasookin, then being run as a ferry on Kootenay Lake. To facilitate this, on 31 July 1942, Bonnington was sold to Nasookin's new owner, the British Columbia Department of Public Works, for $15,306. On 10 June 1944, Bonnington was sold to Frank W. Sutherland, of Arrowhead. This proved unfortunate for history, as in Sutherland's own words:

I wasn't good at keeping things. When I was taking the remains of the Bonnington up to Beaton and we got around the Point-at Nakusp- and had her straightened out, I came across the big ledger with all the names of all the officers that were ever on her, plus the deckhands, firemen etc. And I threw the bloody thing overboard…

There were rumors that the vessel would be towed to Robson and converted to an entertainment hall, but this did not occur. On 26 February 1952 Bonnington was sold to James Millar of Beaton (not far from Arrowhead). Some use was made of Bonnington as a ferry in the 1950s following the installation of diesel engines.

== Wreck site of the Bonnington ==
Over the course of a number of years, Bonnington was partially dismantled at Beaton, and in 1960 the hull filled with water and sank near the shore. In the 1990s, the wreck was located and explored by members of the Underwater Archaeology Society of British Columbia and found to be remarkably intact. Bonnington is the largest freshwater shipwreck site in British Columbia. In the words of historians Parent, Bouliane, and Bouliane:

Though the Bonnington has been stripped down to a bare hull, the Queen of the Southern Interior steamboats is still an impressive sight. She lies in her final resting-place at the end of the secluded Northeast Arm, where the once thriving community of Beaton once stood and is now also just a memory.

== Surviving vessel of class ==
Of the three large sternwheelers built by the C.P.R, Bonnington, Nasookin, and Sicamous, one vessel does survive, Sicamous which is preserved as a museum ship at Penticton, British Columbia. Unfortunately the enormous cabin structure of Sicamous was cut down somewhat in her later years of operation, but even so the great size of this class of inland vessels is still apparent to anyone who visits Sicamous today.

== See also ==
- Canadian Pacific Railway Lake and River Service
