= SS Fairview =

History

Canada
- Port of registry: Victoria, no. 103473
- Route: Skaha Lake, Okanagan Lake
- Builder: M. E. Cousons
- Launched: Spring 1894
- In service: 1894
- Out of service: 1896-97
- Fate: Destroyed by fire

General characteristics
- Class & type: Sternwheeler
- Tonnage: 42.58 GRT, 26.83 NRT
- Length: 55 ft (17 m)
- Beam: 15 feet (4.6 m)
- Depth: 2.9 ft (0.88 m)
- Installed power: 5 hp (3.7 kW)
- Crew: Cpt. Thomas Riley (Captain) and William E. Cousons (engineer)

The S.S. Fairview was a wood-burning sternwheeler built in 1894 for use between Penticton and Okanagan Falls on Skaha Lake in British Columbia, Canada. In 1885, the Fairview was transferred to Okanagan Lake. The sternwheeler had a single cabin and a crew of three.

== Construction and Early Operations ==
The Fairview mining camp, near present day Oliver, British Columbia, was opened in 1887. In the first decade of operations the population of Fairview grew to exceed 800 people and, in 1897, the first townsite was laid. The only transportation connecting the booming town to their much needed supplies in Penticton was a 41 kilometre dirt trail. As mining operations grew, so did demand for a ship to haul heavy industrial equipment down Skaha Lake.

In order to fund the commission of a ship, a syndicate was formed, including founder of Okanagan Falls, W.J. Snodgrass, William E. Cousons, and Cpt. Thomas Riley. The group raise sufficient funds and the S.S. Fairview was launched in the spring of 1894.

On August 11th, 1894, the Fairview made her way down the difficult to navigate Okanagan River on the way to Skaha Lake. The Fairview had made its way through much of the river when a low hanging branch hit the ship, damaging much of the wheelhouse. The sternwheeler was turned around and sent back to the Okanagan Landing shipyards for repair. At this time, the Fairview had her full lengthened to 55 feet to accommodate rough weather.

== Transfer to Okanagan lake ==
Despite Okanagan Lake already having the Canadian Pacific Railway (CPR) sternwheeler, S.S. Aberdeen, and several other ships in service on the lake, the Fairview was transferred from Skaha Lake in 1895. Due to the competitive market, business struggled for the Fairview and the ship was tied up until June, 1896.

== Loss of the Fairview ==
After the failure of service on Okanagan Lake, the Fairview was used as an auxiliary vessel for larger passenger ships and was occasionally used for special outings.

On July 1st, 1896, the Fairview was rented by the Vernon Lacrosse Club for an excursion to Kelowna. While docked, the ship suddenly caught on fire. The vessel, including her machinery and hull, were completely destroyed. It is of note that some sources claim that the wreck of the Fairview occurred on the night of July 2nd, 1897.
