= SS Okanagan =

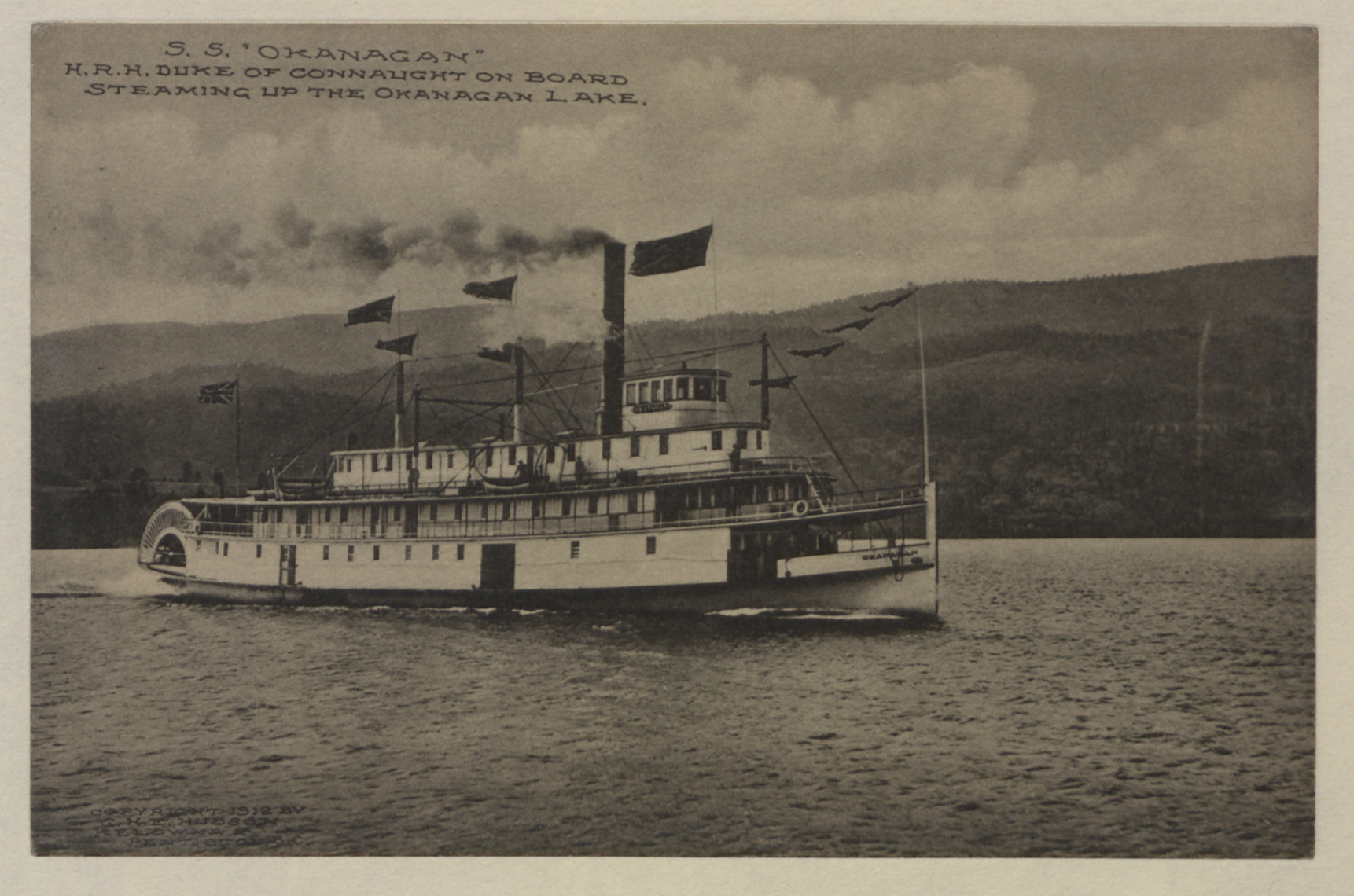
- SS Okanagan, with the Duke of Connaught on board, 1912

History
- Owner: Canadian Pacific Railway
- Port of registry: Victoria, No. 122379
- Builder: Canadian Pacific Railway
- Cost: $90 000
- Laid down: July 10, 1906
- Launched: 1907
- Maiden voyage: 1907
- In service: 1907
- Out of service: 1934
- Fate: Mostly sold for scrap and spare parts, saloon being restored

General characteristics
- Type: Sternwheeler
- Tonnage: 1,008 GRT
- Length: 61 m (200 ft)
- Beam: 9.1 m (30 ft)
- Depth: 2.1 m (6 ft 11 in)
- Decks: 3
- Installed power: 101.3 nominal horsepower
- Capacity: 250-400 passengers

SS Okanagan was a steamship owned and operated by the Canadian Pacific Railway Lake and River Service. The vessel was constructed in 1906 at Okanagan Landing and launched in 1907, becoming Okanagan Lake's second steamship (after the SS Aberdeen). She linked the transportation hubs at both the north and south ends of Okanagan Lake (Vernon and Penticton, respectively, aiding the development of interior British Columbia with other steamships of the 1900s. The ship was retired in 1934 and sold for scrap and spare parts. Only the Stern Saloon, a room in the back of the upper deck, remains. It was moved to the SS Sicamous Heritage Park in Penticton in 2002, to undergo restoration work.

== Commission and construction ==
The SS Okanagan was commissioned by the Canadian Pacific Railway company in 1906 to replace the aging SS Aberdeen, the first steamer on Okanagan Lake, and link communities along the lake to facilitate trade and transportation in the Okanagan Valley. A similar ship named Kuskanook was built in 1906 for Kootenay Lake to aid Moyie with increasing passenger demand. The construction of Okanagan freed Aberdeen to transport freight.

Construction began in the spring of 1906 at Okanagan Landing with James Bulger as master ship builder. The steel hull was built first, and the wooden interior was constructed after. Lightweight wood was chosen for the carpentry work as it would reduce the overall weight of the ship, allowing for greater loads of freight. The low strength of the lighter wood was remedied through the use of haug posts, large cross-laminate timber beams essential in maintaining the structural integrity of the ship, anchored in the steel hull. The keel was laid on July 10.

Although the work was not completely finished, the ship was launched on April 16, 1907: "A special train brought guests to the Landing for launching ceremonies...the beautiful boat then floated out on the bosom of Okanagan Lake as graceful as a swan." Mrs. Gore, wife of Captain Gore, manager of the British Columbia Lake and River Service in the early 1900s, named the ship after Okanagan Lake and the couple hosted a ball in the evening among other festivities.

=== Design ===
The Canadian Pacific Lake and River Service preferred to use stern wheelers for transportation on Okanagan Lake because of their rugged nature and ease of maintenance. The flexibility of the stern wheeler was also well-respected at the time because it allowed the vessel to work in waters where propeller or screw-driven vessels could not. The Canadian Pacific Lake and River Service operated many steam vessels from the late 1800s to mid-1930s and relied on proven designs, with a preference for more rugged and durable vessels. However, the infrastructure and machinery required to service the more modern ships were unavailable in the interior of British Columbia, requiring all new ships to be built using older techniques and designs. As such, these stern wheelers, despite being well-suited to the varying Okanagan conditions, seemed rather modest when compared to the more contemporary boat designs.

Okanagan was designed under a similar style to its successful predecessor, SS Rossland. With a length of 61 metres (200 ft), width of 9.1 metres (30 ft), hull depth of 2.1 metres (6 ft 11 in), and gross tonnage of 1,008 tons, Okanagan was slightly larger than Rossland.

The hull was formed into a deep lake boat pattern, allowing the ship to reach speeds not possible for a riverboat of similar proportions. The ship was designed with an eye for elegance, resulting in a graceful silhouette that lacked the boxy or top-heavy look privy to many other vessels. The layout was similar to other Canadian Pacific vessels, with three main decks (bottom-most for freight, machinery and crew's quarters, upper-most decks reserved for passenger travel and comfort with sitting rooms, galleries, observation decks, a dining hall and saloons). Okanagan boasted five dining room tables, with seating for up to thirty guests at a time, along with thirty-two staterooms and a total passenger capacity of four hundred.

Mechanically speaking, Okanagan was of typical design. A large boiler provided the steam necessary to power each engine and run the on-board dynamo. The boiler itself was coal-fired and, like other boilers of its time, was certified to provide steam pressure up to 140 psi (970 kPa). This steam was transmitted to the rear of the ship (by means of a bulkhead) where the engines drove the paddle wheel, after which the excess steam would be condensed back to its original liquid state and returned to the boiler by the jet condenser.

== Service ==
The SS Okanagan served the communities of the Okanagan for 27 years, from 1907 to 1934. She was faster, larger, and more luxurious than Aberdeen, greatly improving the service around Okanagan Lake. She provided daily passenger service with stops at Kelowna, Peachland, Summerland and Penticton while Aberdeen took care of freight and smaller communities three times a week. This helped the rapid development in population, agriculture, and economy of the Okanagan that was taking place during this time. She was greatly appreciated by the communities she served, during and after her service. The Okanagan Semi-Weekly, a newspaper, reported soon after the launching: "The new CPR steamer Okanagan made a distance of 65 miles in three hours and fifteen minutes, or at the rate of over 21 miles per hour. She's a greyhound...."

=== Murder on the SS Okanagan ===
Constable Aston of Penticton was shot and killed on the SS Okanagan in 1912. The case began when Walter Poelke, going under the name of Walter Byde James, held up a store in a small community named Okanagan Mission. There were only $15 in the store at the time, with which he fled to the city of Penticton, two days to the south on foot, meeting up with an accomplice named Frank Wilson on the way. They were arrested in a hotel by Chief Roche and Constable Aston, who found and confiscated several weapons and 200 rounds of ammunition on James. James and Wilson were put on the SS Okanagan to be transported to Kelowna, escorted by Constable Aston. However, the police had not found a pistol during the initial search, with which James shot Constable Aston before Okanagan arrived at Peachland. James and Wilson escaped by getting off the ship at Peachland. When Constable Aston and the escape were discovered, 200 armed men from all over the valley hunted for them until two special constables found and arrested them at Wilson's Landing, a community north of Kelowna. They were put under heavy guard and Okanagan took them to jail in Kelowna, where they were later transferred to jail in Kamloops and tried for the murder of Constable Aston. Wilson claimed to be an unwilling partner in the affair and turned King's Evidence. James' trial was held on May 12, 1912, in Vernon, where the jury found him guilty of "a most cold-blooded and atrocious murder." On Friday, August 9, 1912, Walter James Poelke, 24 years of age, was hanged at Kamloops for the willful murder of Constable G. H. Aston.

== Retirement and restoration ==
The steamboat era came to a close in the 1930s–1940s due to technological advancement and other forms of transportation. With the construction of highways and railways, passenger service by boat was no longer needed and Okanagan spent her last years transporting freight and pushing barges. She was retired in 1934 and sold in 1938 to be dismantled for scrap and spare parts. However, the SS Sicamous Restoration Society, a "charity...dedicated to protecting the Marine Heritage of the Okanagan," found her stern saloon being used as a beach hut and moved it to the SS Sicamous Heritage Park in Penticton in 2002 to undergo restoration. The SS Okanagan stern saloon has been open to the public seasonally as a free museum display since 2025. Also in the park are the SS Sicamous, SS Naramata, and Canadian National Tug #6.

== See also ==
- Steamboats of Lake Okanagan
