= MV Okanagan =

History

Canada
- Name: MV Okanagan
- Namesake: Okanagan Valley
- Owner: Canadian Pacific Railway
- Route: Penticton to Kelowna
- Builder: West Coast Ltd. Shipbuilders
- Cost: CAD$200 000
- Launched: 1947
- Maiden voyage: 1947
- Out of service: 1972
- Identification: IMO number: 5261491
- Status: Moored at Reserve near Vernon

General characteristics
- Type: MV-Motor Vessel-Diesel Tug
- Length: 110 ft (34 m)
- Draught: 10 ft (3.0 m)
- Depth: 12 ft 6 in (3.81 m)
- Speed: 11 mph (18 km/h; 9.6 kn)

MV Okanagan was a tugboat that operated on Okanagan Lake, Penticton, British Columbia, from 1947 to 1972. It was the largest and last Canadian Pacific-operated tugboat on Okanagan Lake and its retirement marked the end of Canadian Pacific’s service on B.C.’s inland lakes and rivers, as well as 80 years of service on Okanagan Lake. During service, the Okanagan pushed railway barges up and down the lake and broke ice during winter.

== Construction ==
MV Okanagan was built in 1946 by West Coast Ltd. Shipbuilders. It was all welded steel with a diesel engine, and had 800 horsepower. The vessel was designed and built at Vancouver, then broken into pieces and shipped to the Okanagan Landing shipyard to be reassembled. It was 110 ft. long, 24 ft. wide, 12 ft. 6 in. deep, and had a draft of 10 ft. The Okanagan had an eight-cylinder diesel engine and electric pumps. The engine had two Vivian backups, which were generators that were used to prestart the engine, preheat oil, provide electricity, and fill the air compressor tanks. Everything except for the hull, engine, and motors was made in British Columbia. The boat had accommodation for 14 people. Eight crewmates slept below decks in double berth cabins, while the cook had a private room by the galley on the main deck. Four private rooms for officers were on the engineer’s deck and the captain’s office and private bedroom was behind the pilothouse.

== Crew ==
Two notable skippers of MV Okanagan were Captain Walter Spiller and Captain Sam Podmoroff. Spiller was born in 1898 and worked for Canadian Pacific for 46 years. He was a relief skipper for many ships, including SS Sicamous and captained the Okanagan for many years. He worked all the major routes during his career and obtained a Master’s degree in 1930 before his retirement in 1963. Podmoroff worked with Canadian Pacific for 31 years and was the Okanagan's last skipper. He began his career as a deckhand on the SS Valhalla and later the SS Moyie, two ships on Kootenay Lake. He came to the Okanagan as first mate on the tug Kelowna 1947. He became captain of the Okanagan and he docked the ship for the last time in 1972, marking the end of Canadian Pacific’s service on Okanagan Lake.

== Service ==
Boat traffic in the Okanagan saw a steep decline in the 1960s. The Okanagan was the regular service vessel during this time and comfortably handled the traffic between Penticton and Kelowna. The Okanagan's main function was to push railway barges filled with fruit and other cargo to the rail station to be shipped away. It could push two loaded barges of 700 tons each at 11 miles per hour. The boat was also used to break ice with its steel hull, replacing the tug Kelowna. The tugboat SS Naramata became a relief tug for the Okanagan, especially during harvest season and when the Okanagan was refitted in the summer of 1967. The Naramata became mainly a seasonal vessel, while the Okanagan operated year-round.

== Retirement ==
MV Okanagan's last trip was May 31, 1971, under Captain Podmoroff. It was moored at Fintry, British Columbia until 1981. That year it was bought by Vic LeBouthiller. Mr LeBouthiller and crew carried out extensive renovations on the ship and gained permission from Kelowna city council to dock it near the downtown marina. The ship was used for charter parties services over the next four years, serving locals and tourists who reported endless hours of summer fun on the lake under Captain Fog's (Vic LeBouthiller's) command. In 1983 the ship was used in an attempt to break the world water ski record of 70 skiers. They achieved the feat of 37 skiers being pulled by the MV Okanagan during a practice run. Certain he would break the world record during the Okanagan regatta event, with the TV Show That's Incredible filming, Mr. LeBouthiller fell shy of the record after over-loading passengers on the ship in anticipation of the wild post world record on-board party. One of Captain Fog's primary values was "we're here for a good time, not a long time". The ship had over 200 guests and spectators on board and did not achieve sufficient speed to tow the 74 water-skiers in its wake. Over time the ship was used as a floating restaurant called Mad Jac's and was eventually sold. It is now moored in the North Okanagan, where it remains today.

== See also ==
- MV Pentowna
