= Canadian Pacific Railway Upper Lake Service =

Division of Canadian Pacific Railway

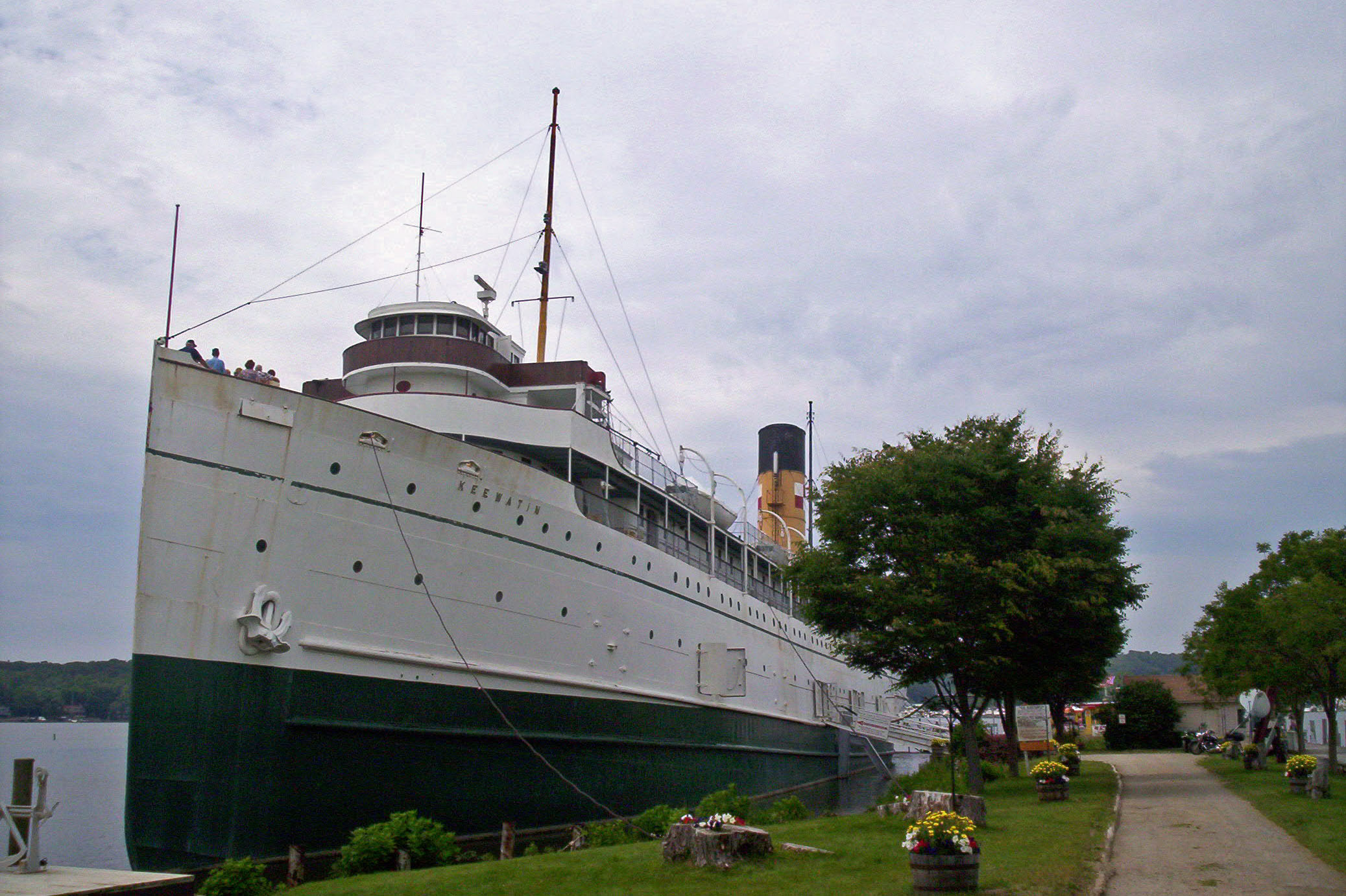
One of the ships of the Upper Lake fleet was the SS Keewatin, formerly preserved as a museum ship in its former home port of Port McNicoll, now refurbished and featured at the Great Lakes Museum, Kingston since 2024.

The Canadian Pacific Railway Upper Lake Service, also known as the Canadian Pacific Railway Upper Lake Steamships, was a division of Canadian Pacific Railway (CPR), which began operating passenger and cargo shipping routes in the Great Lakes during the late 19th century.

== CPR overview ==
In 1884, CPR began purchasing sailing ships as part of a railway supply service on the Great Lakes. Over time, CPR became a railroad company with widely organized water transportation auxiliaries including the CPR Upper Lake Service, the trans-Pacific service, the British Columbia Coast Steamships, the British Columbia Lake and River Service, the trans-Atlantic service, and the Ferry service. In the 20th century, the company evolved into a transcontinental railroad which operated two transoceanic services which connected Canada with Europe and with Asia. The range of CPR services were aspects of an integrated plan. The service was ended in 1965.

== Canadian Pacific Railway Upper Lake Steamships ==
CPR's investment in the Great Lakes produced expanded routes and schedules. The inland waters fleet and personnel increased. The decision to expand produced an infrastructure building program. The evolution of the upper lakes service was integrated into CPR's rail service network with trans-Pacific connections.

== Inland fleet ==
CANADIAN PACIFIC RAILWAY UPPER LAKE FLEET
| Active Service | Vessel Name | Launch Date | Maiden Voyage | Other Names | Notes | Loss Date |
|---|---|---|---|---|---|---|
| 1883 | SS Algoma | 1883 | 1883 | | Lost in a storm on the southern shore of Isle Royale in a storm with the loss of 37 lives. Engines & Boilers reused in the SS Manitoba. | 1885 |
| 1883 | SS Alberta | 1883 | 1883 | | | 1947 |
| 1883 | SS Athabasca | 1883 | 1883 | | misspelled in the register 1883–1910, always spelled with a 'C' on the ship | 1948 |
| 1889 | SS Manitoba | 1889 | 1889 | | | 1950 |
| 1907 | SS Assiniboia | 1907 | 1907 | | | 1970 |
| 1907 | SS Keewatin | 1907 | 1907 | | converted as museum ship at Douglas, Michigan. Returned to its home port at Port McNicoll in 2012. In 2023 re-located to the Great Lakes Museum in Kingston. |

== See also ==
- Canadian Pacific Railway Coast Service
- Canadian Pacific Railway Lake and River Service
