= MV Pentowna =

Canadian ship

History

Canada
- Namesake: Penticton and Kelowna
- Owner: Canadian National Railway
- Route: Kelowna to Penticton
- Builder: Prince Rupert Dry Dock
- Laid down: 13 May 1926
- Launched: 20 June 1926
- Maiden voyage: 1926
- Out of service: 1973
- Refit: 1937
- Home port: Kelowna
- Identification: IMO number: 5274280
- Fate: Scrapped

General characteristics
- Class & type: Motor vessel
- Tonnage: 350 GT, 300 NT
- Length: 127 ft (39 m)
- Beam: 22 ft (6.7 m)
- Depth: 9 ft (2.7 m)
- Speed: 15 knots (28 km/h; 17 mph)
- Capacity: 130 passengers
- Crew: 30

MV Pentowna was a motor ship that transported passengers, and later freight, on Okanagan Lake from 1926 to 1973. It was the first boat to be owned and operated by Canadian National Railway (CNR) on Okanagan Lake and the first diesel-powered boat on the lake. Pentowna served the communities between Kelowna and Penticton with two daily round trips, aiding the development of the Okanagan Valley with its modern technology and speed.

== Construction ==
In September 1925, CNR completed its branch line from Kamloops to Kelowna. It built a transfer slip at Kelowna and started boat service on Okanagan Lake with the twin-screw Pentowna. Pentowna was prefabricated at the Prince Rupert Dry Dock yards, and then broken apart and shipped to Kelowna. There, 65 experienced shipbuilders from Dumbarton, Scotland reassembled the boat under the supervision of CNR officials and its future skipper, Captain Roe. Pentowna was of modern design, with a steel hull and twin diesel engines. The absence of boilers and heat greatly improved the handling of perishable fruits, and officials ensured that speed, accommodation, and the buffet service were up to the highest standards in Canada. Pentowna was the first diesel-powered ship on the lake, with the finest and most up-to-date engines possible made by Gardner and Company in Manchester, England. The keel was laid on 13 May 1926. The ship was 127 feet (39 m) long with a beam of 22 feet (6.7 m), moulded depth of 9 feet (2.7 m), and rated for gross and net tonnage at 350 GT and 300 NT. It had accommodation for a crew of 30 and 130 passengers. Pentowna could carry 125 tons of freight at 15 knots (28 km/h; 17 mph).

=== Name ===
Captain Roe originally had 27 names in mind for the new boat, but travelled to Vancouver and found that all 27 were already in the marine registry. Some of these included Kelowna and Orchard City. Finally, the vice president of CNR suggested the name Pentowna, a portmanteau of Penticton and Kelowna, the boat's two terminal stations.

== Service ==
Pentowna was launched on 20 June 1926, and served the communities between Kelowna and Penticton. It made two round trips from Kelowna to Penticton every day, except for Sunday. It left Kelowna at 6am, stopped at Westbank, Peachland, Greata, Summerland, and Naramata, and arrived in Penticton at 9am. It would be back in Kelowna by 1pm and leave again at 2:15, arriving in Penticton at 5:15 and returning to Kelowna by 9pm. It played an important role as CNR's first boat on Okanagan Lake, and improved passenger service to the railway with its modern technology.

=== Conversion into tug ===
Despite its modern conveniences, one problem on Pentowna was vibration. One account even says that it was so bad that ketchup from uncapped bottles would shoot up from the table in the small dining room. Because of these deficiencies and because new highways and modes of transportation meant fewer passengers, Pentowna was converted into a cargo tug in 1937. The job was given to North Vancouver Shipyards Ltd., who installed a new steel deck and towing machinery and stripped off Pentowna's upper structures. The galley was moved to the top deck and the life boats were raised. After a two-month layover, Pentowna went back into service as a freight ship.

== Retirement ==
CNR ceased operations on Okanagan Lake in 1973. Canadian National Tug no. 6, CNR's other remaining ship, was sold and Pentowna was docked on the Peachland waterfront. In the 1980s, private owners tried to refit the boat for tourism but dropped the project. Pentowna was bought by Dennis Dumaresq, owner of the Michaelbrook Ranch Golf Course in Kelowna, in 1994. However, he decided to scrap it nine years later because he didn't have the funds to refurbish it as planned. Andy Schwab tried to buy the boat and save it for CAD$20,000, but was unable to amass the sum. Pentowna was scrapped in November 2005.

== See also ==
- MV Okanagan
