= MV Columbia (1948) =

MV Columbia was a passenger motor vessel that was operated on the Arrow Lakes in British Columbia, Canada from 1948 to 1954. She was the Canadian Pacific Railway Company's last vessel in a long line of ships on the Arrow Lakes and was sold after the retirement of SS Minto to Ivan Horie, who continued a freight service for a few years.
