= Texas (steamboat) =

Structure or section of a steamboat which includes the pilothouse and the crew's quarters

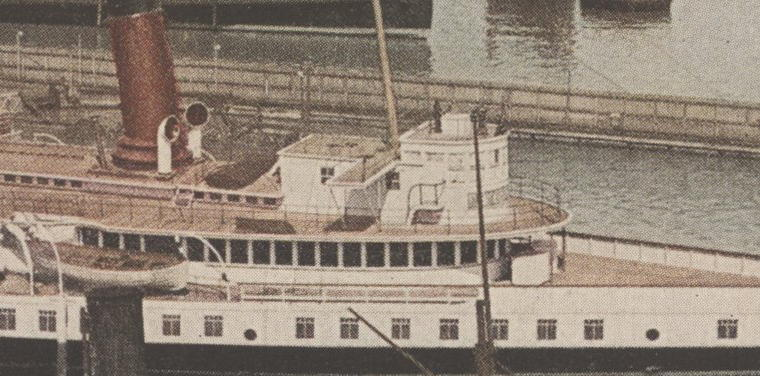
Cropped image of Chippewa, focusing on the texas which is located just aft of the pilothouse

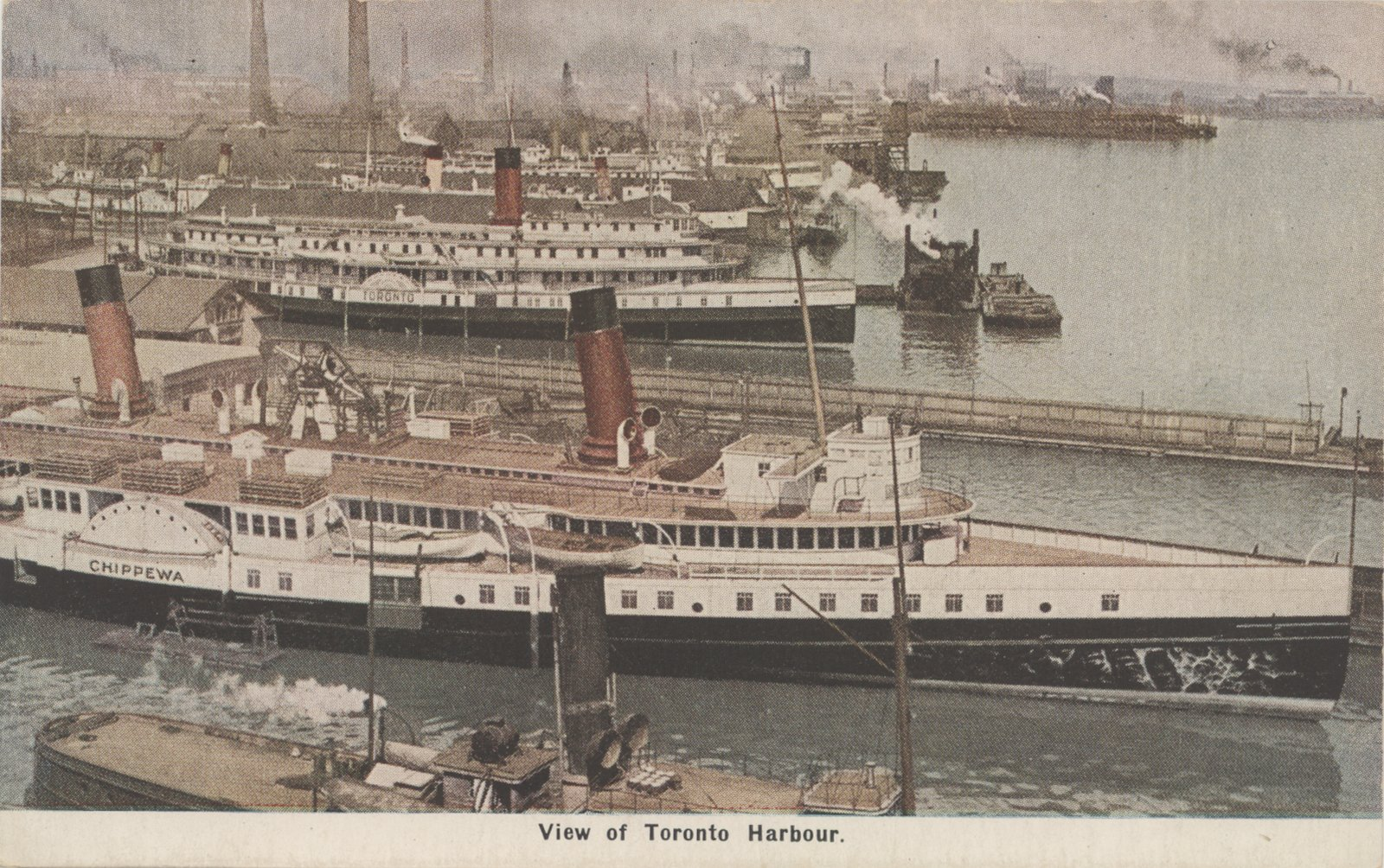
In this c. 1925 postcard of the Toronto waterfront, the Canada Steamship Lines steamboats Chippewa and Toronto show differences in the texas which is just aft of the pilothouse on the upper texas-deck

The texas, in American English, is a structure or section of a steamboat that includes the crew's quarters. It is located on the hurricane deck, which is also called the texas deck. This long, narrow cabin is near and may be surmounted by the pilothouse.

== History ==
A steamboat's texas is named in honor of the state of Texas. This innovation in steamboat construction was introduced about the same time that the state of Texas became part of the United States in 1845.

In this period, steamboat cabins were conventionally named after states and the officers' quarters were the largest. This structure housing the largest cabins was identified with Texas, which was then the largest state.

== Usage ==
The term became widely known after the publication of Mark Twain's Huckleberry Finn. In the section in which Huck and Jim encounter a wrecked steamboat:

"... there ain't nothing to watch but the texas and the pilot-house; and do you reckon anybody's going to resk his life for a texas and a pilot-house such a night as this, when it's likely to break up and wash off down the river any minute?" Jim couldn't say nothing to that, so he didn't try.

— Mark Twain, The Annotated Huckleberry Finn : Adventures of Huckleberry Finn (Tom Sawyer's comrade)

== Variations ==
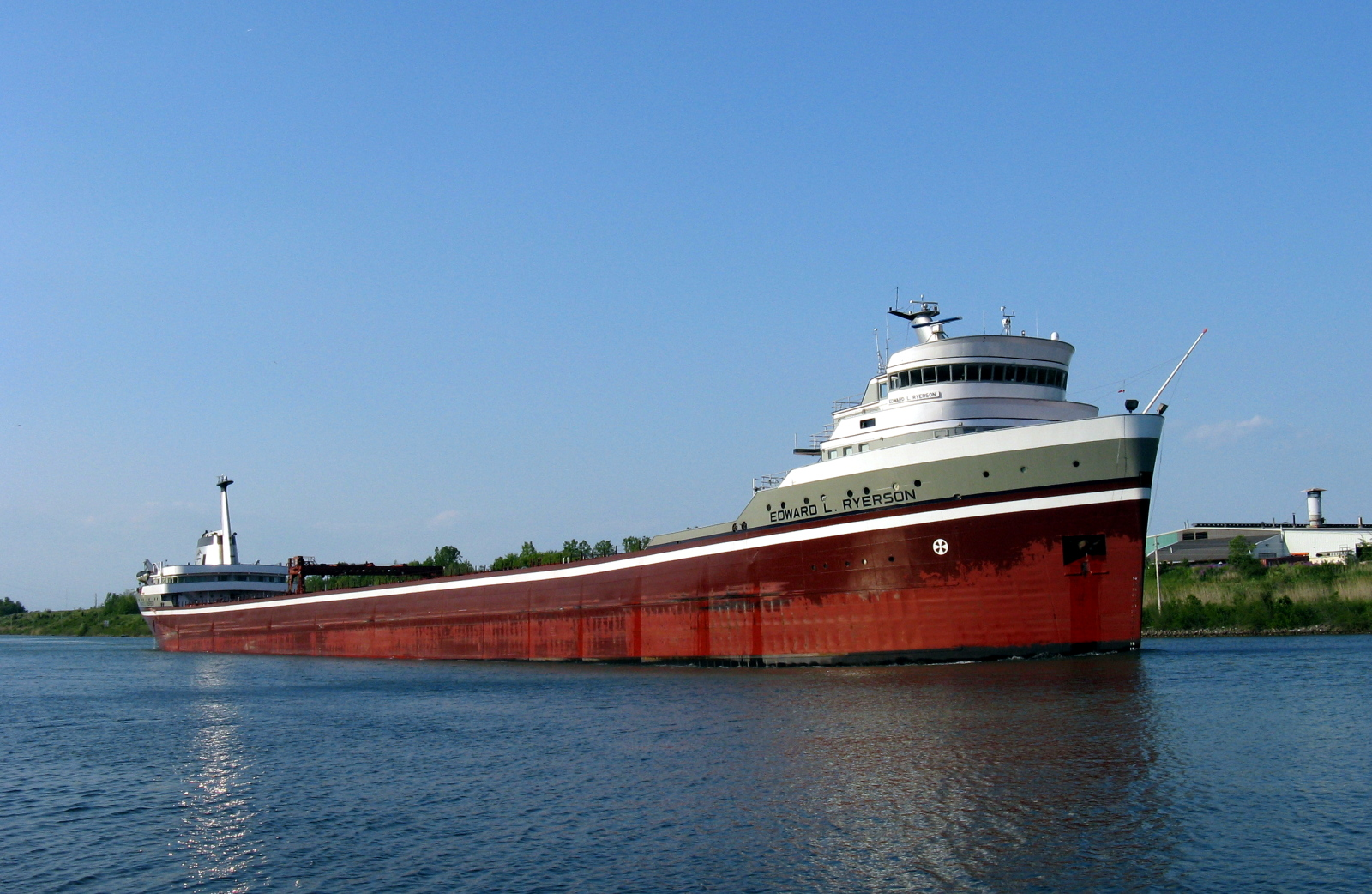
Edward L. Ryerson showing the texas

On the Great Lakes, lake freighters have deck houses at the bow and stern with cargo holds in the center. For those, the texas refers to the layer of the deck house that is just below the wheel house / bridge.
