= Moyie (sternwheeler) =

Canadian paddle steamship

Coordinates: 49.9117°N 116.9023°W

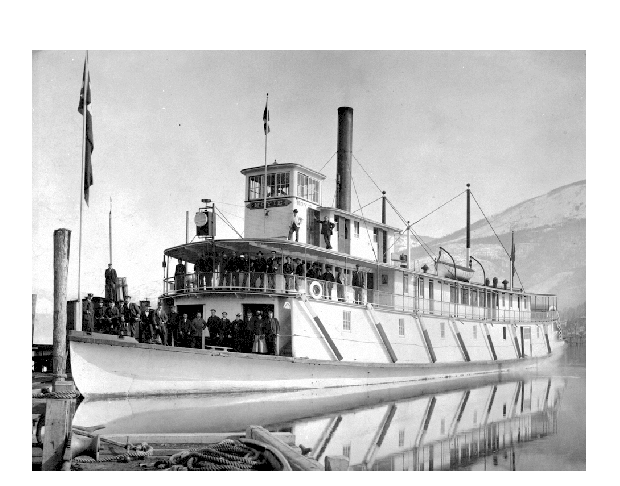
- SS Moyie in 1898

History

Canada
- Name: Moyie
- Launched: October 22, 1898
- In service: 1898
- Out of service: 1957
- Status: Restored and made a National Historic Site

General characteristics
- Type: Paddle steamer
- Length: 161.7 ft (49.3 m)
- Beam: 30.1 ft (9.2 m)
- Speed: 12 knots (22 km/h; 14 mph)

National Historic Site of Canada
- Official name: S.S. Moyie National Historic Site of Canada
- Designated: 1958

Moyie is a paddle steamer sternwheeler that operated on Kootenay Lake in British Columbia, Canada from 1898 until 1957.

After her nearly sixty years of service, she was sold to the town of Kaslo and restored. She is a National Historic Site of Canada and the world's oldest intact passenger sternwheeler.

A replica of Moyie currently runs in Heritage Park Historical Village in Calgary. She does seasonal runs in the Glenmore Reservoir.

== History ==
The Moyie was built in prefabricated sections in Toronto, Ontario, and was originally intended for service on the Stikine River as part of an "all Canadian" water and rail route to the goldfields during the Klondike Gold Rush. However, when the project failed for the lack of a railway, the Moyie and her sister ship, the Minto were put into service on Arrow Lakes and Kootenay Lake in the Kootenays of southern British Columbia.

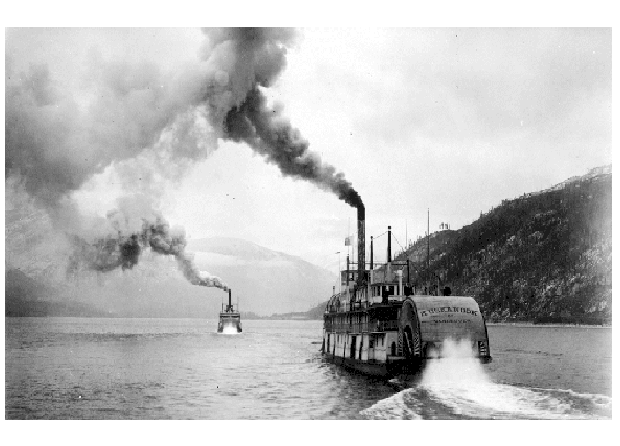
Moyie and Kuskanook racing on Kootenay Lake (1908)

She was launched and christened at Nelson on October 22, 1898, and embarked on her maiden voyage on December 7, connecting with a new line of the Canadian Pacific Railway (CPR), which ran from Lethbridge, Alberta, and through the Crowsnest Pass to Nelson. The Moyie soon became a favourite with passengers, featuring a large and elegantly appointed dining saloon, a luxurious smoking lounge, private ladies' saloon and comfortable overnight cabins, all richly decorated in gold leaf.

As the major vessel on Kootenay Lake, she was dubbed the "Crow Boat" and was the queen of the lake during the boom years of the early 1900s when the population of the Kootenays was expanding and there was increased demand for passenger and freight services. During this period, the Moyie was joined by many other large and luxurious sternwheelers, among them the CPR's Kuskanook, which arrived in 1906 and the Bonnington, launched in 1911. These large and richly appointed vessels were part of the CPR's plan to develop the area into a major tourism center and the railway also built a grand resort hotel in the town of Balfour. However, the onset of World War I put an end to many of the CPR's grand dreams for the West Kootenays and one by one, the other sternwheelers were taken off of the route and the hotel at Balfour was closed.

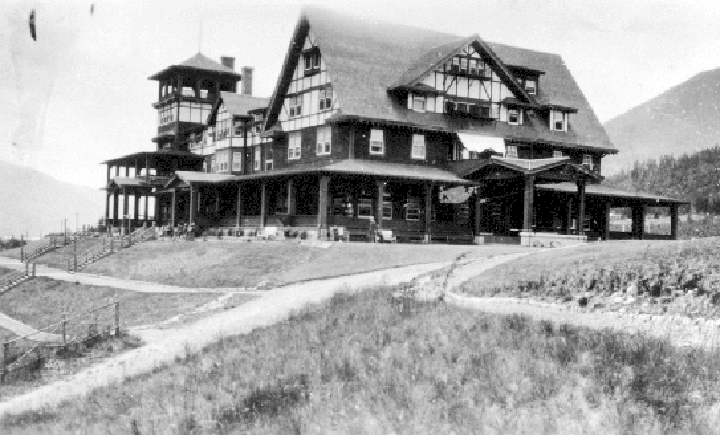
CPR hotel at Balfour (1918)

After the war, the Moyie remained in almost constant service, continuing as a relief vessel, towing barges and hauling supplies such as lumber or coal. She was also used for pleasure excursions, and on holidays like Victoria Day could be seen on the lake traveling from Nelson to Procter hung with streamers and bunting and carrying 200 passengers.

Through the next 40 years, her route and purpose changed very little and by the 1930s the CPR had retired its other vessels and she continued on alone, accompanied only by her relief ship, the Granthall. On Arrow Lakes, her sister ship, the Minto was enjoying a similarly long and prestigious career, running until April 24, 1954.

== Final voyage ==
The Moyie's last run was on April 27, 1957. She ran her regular 87-mile (140 km)-long route, stopping at towns and landings such as Riondel, Ainsworth, Kaslo, Lardeau, and Argenta. At each stop she was greeted by tearful residents who honored her many years of service by farewell banners, songs and wreaths. At Argenta, she left to the sad strains of "Auld Lang Syne". At Kaslo, the stores were closed and a banner read, "Better lo'ed ye ne'er will be. Will ye no come back again?" When her last journey was finished, she pulled into the wharf at Procter.

== Restoration ==
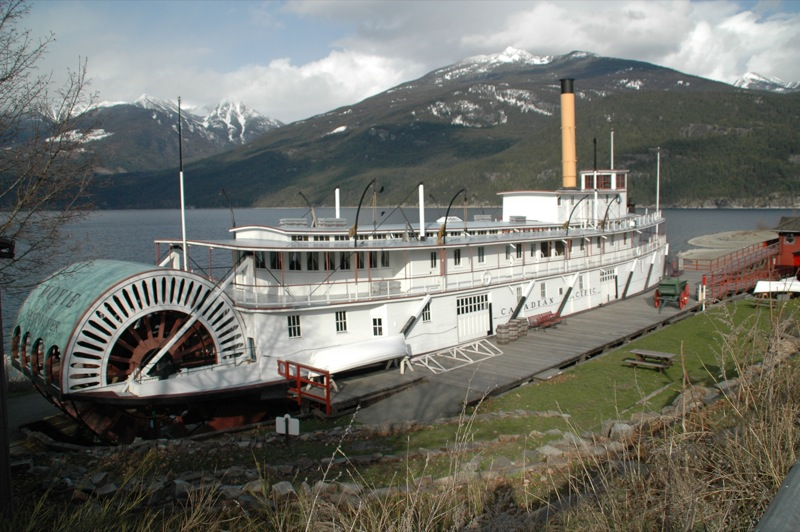
Moyie is currently sitting at Kaslo, serving as a National Historic Site of Canada.

In Kaslo, although no longer the boomtown that it once was, the 700 residents decided that they wanted to provide the Moyie's final home. The CPR was agreeable to the plan and sold her to the town for C$1. The Kootenay Lake Historical Society was formed and $15,000 was raised to finance the initial phase of her restoration. She has been restored to her original operating condition and sits on a concrete berth at the end of Front Street in Kaslo. As the last surviving passenger sternwheeler of the 1890s, she receives thousands of visitors every year and has been made a National Historic Site and is a well-known British Columbia landmark.

== See also ==
- Canadian Pacific Railway Lake and River Service
- List of ships in British Columbia
- Heritage Park Historical Village in Calgary, Alberta, where a working replica of the Moyie can be viewed and ridden.
