= Okanagan Landing =

- Shipyard
- Location of Okanagan Landing in British Columbia
- Coordinates: 50°14′00″N 119°21′00″W
- Country: Canada
- Province: British Columbia
- Time zone: UTC−07:00 (PT)
- Area codes: 250, 778
- Website: http://www.okanaganlanding.com/index.html

Okanagan Landing was an unincorporated settlement and steamboat port at the north end of Okanagan Lake in the Southern Interior of British Columbia. Located southwest of the city of Vernon, it was the terminus station for the Shuswap and Okanagan Railway and served as the port and shipyard for steamboats operating to the south, as well as a transfer barge slip.

== Development ==
Okanagan Landing was developed in 1892 when the Shuswap and Okanagan Railway from Sicamous was completed. It was built as a shipyard to construct and maintain the SS Aberdeen, the first Canadian Pacific Railway(CPR) steamship on Okanagan Lake. The post office was opened on October 1, 1898.

== Bridging the Gap ==
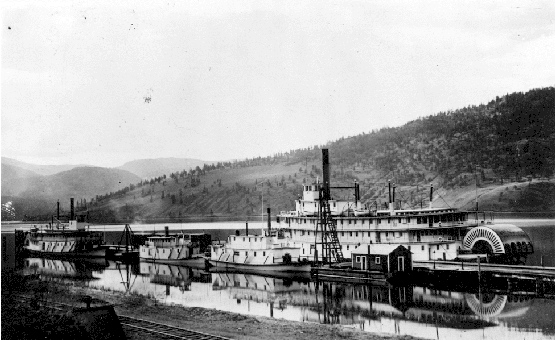
Okanagan Landing served as a bridge between the CPR boat and train service. Three luxury vessels, a host of smaller passenger and freight boats, as well as the Kettle Valley Railway operated from Okanagan Landing to Penticton, working in unison to maintain the already high standards of service known to CPR passengers. Ships that were built at and serviced Okanagan Landing include the SS Penticton, SS Aberdeen, SS Kaleden, SS Okanagan, SS Naramata, and SS Sicamous. Located in Penticton, the luxurious Incola Hotel was operated by the CPR and served to accommodate the various needs of travelers traveling by boat or train. The picture below shows steamboats at Okanagan Landing in 1916.

== Decline and Present Day ==
After the last steamship on the lake, the SS Sicamous, was retired in 1936, ship repairs continued in the yards until the 1960s. The decommissioned land was bought in 1971 by the Okanagan Landing and District Community Association. The association was formed "To promote recreational, educational and cultural activities in Okanagan Landing and District; to improve the condition of and advance in every way community life and public affairs in the Okanagan Landing and District area and to provide suitable building and grounds for the furtherance of such objects." Okanagan Landing was annexed to the city of Vernon in 1993, but the association continues to maintain the area, now known as Paddlewheel Park. The association holds monthly meetings in the Shipwrights Hall. The hall was burned in 1999 and the new hall opened in April 2000. The station house holds the museum and archives, as well as meeting rooms. Organizations and activities supported by the association include the playground, North Okanagan Sailing Association, Vernon Paddling Center, annual regatta, community potluck suppers, community dances, weekly social bridge games and fall and spring "clean-up" days.

== See also ==
- Sicamous (sternwheeler)
- Steamboats of Lake Okanagan
- Vernon, British Columbia
