= Sicamous (sternwheeler) =

Steamship in British Columbia

Coordinates: 49°30′07″N 119°36′40″W

S.S. Sicamous
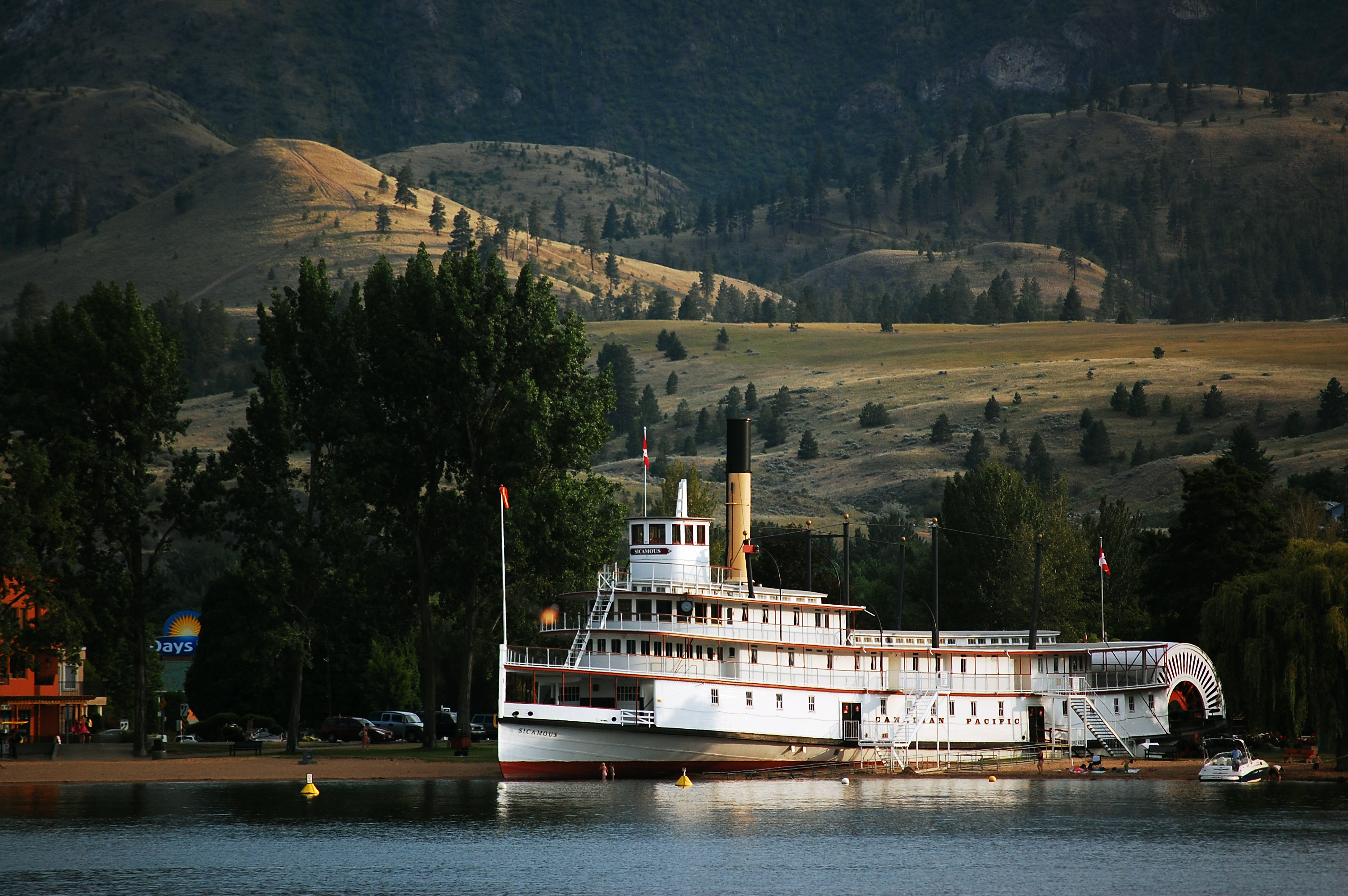
- SS Sicamous in Penticton

History

Canada
- Owner: S.S. Sicamous Restoration Society
- Operator: Canadian Pacific Railway
- Port of registry: Victoria, No. 134726:56
- Route: Penticton to Okanagan Landing
- Builder: Western Dry Dock and Shipbuilding Company
- Cost: $180,000.00
- Launched: May 19 1914
- In service: 1914-1936
- Out of service: 1936
- Fate: Docked and restored as a museum
- Status: Museum ship

General characteristics
- Type: Sternwheeler
- Tonnage: 1787 tons (Gross tonnage) 994 tons (Net tonnage)
- Length: 200.5 ft (61.1 m)
- Beam: 39.1 ft (11.9 m)
- Height: 53 ft (main deck to pilot house)
- Decks: 4
- Speed: 18 kt
- Capacity: 260-500 passengers
- Crew: 33

The S.S. Sicamous is a large, four-decked sternwheeler commissioned by the Canadian Pacific Railway (CPR) and was built by the Western Dry Dock and Shipbuilding Company for passenger and freight services on Okanagan Lake.

The S.S. Sicamous is currently beached on Lakeshore Drive West in Penticton and is open to the public as a museum, restoration site, and venue. The ship is a part of the S.S. Sicamous Marine Heritage Park, which also oversees the S.S. Naramata, CN #6 tugboat, S.S. Okanagan stern saloon, and a dredge-boat service shed.

== Career ==
The S.S. Sicamous was built in 1914 and retired in 1936, after twenty-two years of freight and passenger service for the Canadian Pacific Railway Lake and River Service. Construction of Sicamous began September 1913 and continued throughout the winter, finishing in the spring of 1914. The hull, engine and boiler were fabricated beforehand in Port Arthur, Ontario (Thunder Bay) and shipped to the construction site at Okanagan Landing. It took seventeen railcars to ship the prefabricated materials to the construction site. Up to 150 men were hired to build both the Sicamous and her sister ship, the SS Naramata. The cost to build Sicamous alone was estimated to be $180,000 not including the additional $14,000 spent on fine furnishings.

The SS Sicamous was launched May 19 1914, at 2:15 in the afternoon, and had its first excursion on 12 June 1914. When first put in service, the Sicamous was considered a first-class steamship and would be the largest vessel operated on the lake.

In 1935, the ship was converted primarily into a cargo vessel to accommodate changing service needs. This involved removing the passenger "Texas" deck and refitting parts of the interior. The 1935 reconstruction reduced total berths from 80 to 20. The S.S. Sicamous was retired from service the next year and sat at Okanagan Landing until 1951 when the ship was purchased by the Penticton Gyro Club and brought back to the city of Penticton.

== Ship Layout ==
The S.S. Sicamous originally had five decks, including the cargo deck, passenger decks, observation deck, and the captain's wheel house.

Although passengers would board the ship on the cargo deck, their access was limited to the bow. After boarding they would head up either one of the two exterior staircases leading to the saloon deck. The saloon deck was home to the dining hall which featured a mezzanine balcony and clerestory windows. Located at the bow was the Gentlemen’s Saloon with a bar. The stern of the main passenger deck also housed the ladies' saloon, for women and children. Above the saloon deck was the observation deck. This was where passengers would go to admire the view of Okanagan Lake and the surrounding area. Much like the saloon deck, ladies and gentlemen each had their own separate observation area, with women observing at the bow, and men at the stern. Just beneath the pilot house was the texas deck, which served as a casual meeting place for the captain and his crew.

The combined factors of the Kettle Valley Railway, which ran along the east side of Okanagan Lake, the construction of the highway along the west side of the lake, and the influence of the Great Depression in the 1930s contributed to a decline in ridership and profitability for the Sicamous. As a result, the CPR decided to renovate Sicamous, removing the texas deck and two-thirds of the observation deck. These changes were designed to reduce wind resistance and weight, decreasing coal consumption and allowing for more cargo to be transported. Despite her decrease in size, Sicamous remained a first-class steamship with the same fine Australian mahogany and Burmese teak finishings.

== Service ==
Sicamous was a steam-driven sternwheeler, consuming an average of fifteen to seventeen tons of coal each day, depending upon weather conditions and the number of stops made along the lake. Today Sicamous remains the largest steam-powered, steel-hulled sternwheeler in Canada. Twenty-three feet long and made of Carnegie flange steel, the boiler was designed to burn 1720 kilograms of coal each hour. It was important to maintain a large and very hot fire burning within the boiler. Surrounding the fire was a steel chamber containing water pulled from the lake as well as 320 hollow tubes. These tubes would heat rapidly, quickly turning the water to steam. Pressure would build and the temperature would rise. The steam pressure was constantly monitored and maintained at 160 psi by a fireman or an engineer who was responsible for manually releasing steam as needed. This steam would travel from the boiler to the engines via the bulkhead, a large tube attached to the ceiling of the bilge. Sicamous had two engines, each with a low- and high-pressure cylinder. Steam would travel from cylinder to cylinder, moving pistons which were attached to the ship's pitman arms. These pitman arms were connected to the wooden stern wheel and moved completely out of phase with one another, distributing power equally to both sides of the stern wheel.

== Crew ==
While off duty, the twenty-four crew members aboard Sicamous would sleep in the crew's quarters at the stern of the cargo deck. These rooms consisted of three single bunks and housed up to six men. Crew members would sleep in shifts, sharing bunks where need be. Their quarters were known for having bed bug and cockroach infestations while also being plagued by mosquitoes living in the valley. However, a warm place to stay overnight and three meals a day were included in the crew's wages.

S.S. Sicamous Chief Engineers
William Jacobs
D. Stephens
D.H. Biggam
John F. McRae
P.H. Pearce

During World War I, many of the Lake and River Service's skilled engineers left for battle, leaving numerous steamships, including Sicamous, without a Chief Engineer. As a result, Dave Stephens (rumored to be the D. Stephens above) filled in for the younger men who had joined the army. Dave Stephens was the British Columbia Lake and River Service's Primary Chief Engineer and oversaw operations from Nelson.

S.S. Sicamous Captains	
George Estabrooks	1914
Otto Estabrooks	1915
William Kirby	1916
Groge Robertson	1917-1921
Joseph Weeks	1922-1935

Before he became a captain, Otto Estabrooks (at the age of fifteen) was assigned the task of relieving the night watchman. He was responsible for keeping the fire within the boiler burning strongly throughout the night. This was necessary so that Sicamous could leave on time the next morning. His recollection is included below:

"The first night I fell asleep and did not waken until 5:30 a.m., exactly in time to sound the three whistles to announce that it was a half hour before leaving time-something any kid would have loved to do all by himself. Rushing to the pilot house and pulling the cord, it didn’t whistle. There wasn’t enough steam. The engineer, a gentleman of the first water, said he forgot to tell me to keep steam up. They were kind words from a kind man, even if they were not true."

== Retirement and Restoration ==
In August 1937, the S.S. Sicamous went on her final run, taking the members of the Penticton Gyro Club down Okanagan Lake before being permanently retired. The Sicamous was docked at Okanagan Landing for the entirety of the Second World War, where she was vulnerable to vandalism and theft. In 1951, the Penticton Gyro Club purchased the ship for one dollar and the Sicmous was moved to Lakeshore Drive on the shore of Okanagan Lake in Penticton, British Columbia with the help of the CPR tugboat, MV Okanagan.

Under the ownership of the Penticton Gyro Club, the Sicamous had several rooms enlarged, the dining room floor flattened, and the original wood flooring replaced with linoleum for dancing. Throughout the 1950s, the ship held community dances, concerts, and club meetings. After several years as a clubhouse, the Club could no longer maintain the S.S. Sicamous and so the ship was sold. She then housed the Penticton Museum, a wax museum, and a restaurant.

In 1987, the City of Penticton surveyed the condition of the heritage vessel and discovered severe damage to the ladies saloon caused by grease from the deep fryers. Due to risk of fire, the City declared the need to either dismantle the ship or restore her. In 1988, the S.S. Sicamous Restoration Society was formed by a group of volunteers dedicated to preserving the marine heritage of the Okanagan Valley. After extensive restoration efforts, the Sicamous was open to the public as a museum in 1989 and later expanded to host events and be available for venue rentals. The cargo deck of the Sicamous also houses a HO scale model railway run by the Kettle Valley Model Railway Club.

As of 2026, the S.S. Sicamous remains on the shore of Okanagan Lake alongside the S.S. Naramata, the Canadian National No. 6 tugboat, the S.S. Okanagan stern saloon, and a shed once used to maintain dredge boats on Okanagan River.

== See also ==
- Steamboats of Lake Okanagan
- Canadian Pacific Railway Lake and River Service
- List of historic vessels in British Columbia
