= SS Naramata =

Steam tugboat

Coordinates: 49.502159°N 119.611488°W

Naramata
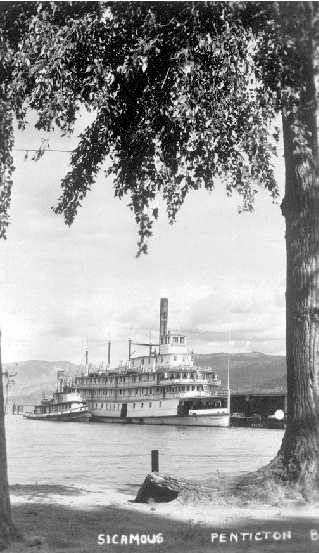
- SS Naramata and SS Sicamous at Penticton, 1920

History

Canada
- Namesake: Naramata
- Owner: Canadian Pacific Railway (1914–c.1967); Kettle Valley Railway Heritage Society (1991–2001); S.S. Sicamous Restoration Society (2001–)
- Builder: Western Dry Dock and Shipbuilding Company
- Cost: CA$43,000
- Completed: 20 April 1914
- Out of service: August 1967
- Status: Museum ship

General characteristics
- Tonnage: 149.94 GT (73.67 registered)
- Length: 98 ft (30 m) LOA (89.8 ft (27.4 m) registered)
- Beam: 19.5 ft (5.9 m); 43 ft (13 m) guards
- Height: 53 ft (16 m)
- Draught: 5.5 ft (1.7 m)
- Depth: 8 ft (2.4 m)
- Installed power: 10.5 ft × 9.5 ft (3.2 m × 2.9 m) Scotch Marine Boiler; Fore-and-aft, compound jet-condensing; 12 in × 18 in (30 cm × 46 cm) and 26 in × 18 in (66 cm × 46 cm)
- Propulsion: 6 ft 5 in (1.96 m) four-blade screw; 150 ihp (110 kW) (27.3 hp (20.4 kW) nominal)
- Speed: 12 mph (19 km/h); 7 mph (11 km/h) towing

SS Naramata is a steam tug commissioned by the Canadian Pacific Railway (CPR) company. She pushed barges and broke ice on Okanagan Lake from 1914 to 1967. After over 50 years of service, the boat was eventually retired and left to rest in Penticton beside her sister ship, SS Sicamous. In 2001, she was purchased by the S.S. Sicamous Restoration Society and is currently undergoing extensive renovations. Naramata is the only interior steam tug to be preserved in the province of British Columbia, Canada.

== Manufacture ==
Built for CPR, the hull, engine, boiler, and steel fittings of Naramata were pre-manufactured in Port Arthur, Ontario (now Thunder Bay) by Western Dry Dock and Shipbuilding Company, with final assembly taking place in Okanagan Landing. Construction began in September 1913 and was completed by the 20th of April in 1914. Upon completion, the total cost was CA$43,000 and she was named after the village of Naramata, a town which at that time was responsible for producing a large portion of the valley's fruit supply.

== Crew ==
The crew aboard Naramata consisted of 11-13 men: a captain or first officer, a pilot, two deckhands, a chief engineer, a second engineer, two firemen, one bargeman, and a cook who also served as a steward. The ship was the first on Okanagan Lake to have a flushing toilet and was equipped with a functioning shower. Due to the dirty nature of the job, crew members were required to shower at least once a week. Often, it was a joke that the crew members were considered to be some of the "cleanest and dirtiest" on the lake.

== The role of SS Naramata ==
Naramata would occasionally carry passengers (maximum 22) up or down Okanagan Lake, but she was mainly employed as a tugboat for the Canadian Pacific Railway. CPR tugboats not only pushed and pulled barges filled with valuable goods, but in the winter months they would work as icebreakers, clearing the way for other larger and often wooden-hulled passenger ships. Naramata would often run ahead of Sicamous with crew members leaving a cardboard trail as a way to mark the clear path. More commonly, however, was the barge service. CPR tugboats could push up to two barges at once, and with barges capable of holding up to ten railcars at one time this was no small feat. When transporting two barges, Naramata would be wedged between them from astern, resulting in a "V"-shape that allowed for easy maneuvering. Alternately, barges could also be pulled from behind the tugs.

== Retirement ==
Naramata was retired in August 1967. After her retirement, she was kept at Okanagan Landing and passed through a variety of owners.

=== Restoration ===
In 1991, Naramata was sold to the Kettle Valley Railway Heritage Society and the City of Penticton. On October first of that same year, she was moved to Penticton where she remained afloat beside Sicamous until 1993. Upon discovering that the coal storage holds had begun to corrode, work began immediately to remove remaining coal and beach the tugboat in order to prevent damage to the hull.

In 1996, ownership of the Naramata was transferred to the S.S. Sicamous Restoration Society, and the Society took over maintenance of the damaged ship. This included the removal of three tons of coal and asbestos, general carpentry and safety repairs, and the installation of a steel staircase to allow for easier public access. In 2004 a CA$90,000 grant was awarded to the Society by the Western Economic Diversification Fund, a federal government program. This permitted further restoration of the ship and she received a deep cleaning and a fresh coat of paint. This was followed by the restoration of the pilothouse, some crew cabins, the replacement of numerous windows and the implementation of a security system.

In 2024, the City of Penticton announced concerns about the condition of the hull of the Naramata and the possibility of removing the tugboat from the S.S. Sicamous Marine Heritage Park for demolition. Extensive work was then done by the S.S. Sicamous Marine Heritage Society, including condition reports, fundraising, and creating a plan to raise the Naramata into a cradle.

In a city council meeting held on September 1st, 2026, the City of Penticton voted unanimously in support of the plan to raise the S.S. Naramata, providing the final $45,000 of $250,000 collected by the Society. Construction is scheduled to begin in March of 2027.
