= MV Lloyd-Jones =

History

Canada
- Name: Lloyd-Jones (1950–1960); Bowen Queen (1960–1965); Vesuvius Queen (1965–1998)
- Launched: July 1950

General characteristics
- Type: Ferry
- Capacity: 35 cars

MV Lloyd-Jones was a steel ferry that operated on Okanagan Lake in British Columbia, Canada. She carried cars and freight between the communities of Kelowna and West Kelowna with two other boats, MV Lequime and MV Pendozi. However, they struggled to carry the load, especially after the opening of the Okanagan Lake Bridge in 1958. Lloyd-Jones was launched in July 1950. She had a capacity of 35 cars and was the last of a large fleet of ferries on Okanagan Lake.

== See also ==
- MV Aricia
- SS Clovelly (ferry)
- MV Grace Darling (1919)
- MV Grace Darling (1923)
