= MV Lequime =

Ferry that operated in Canada

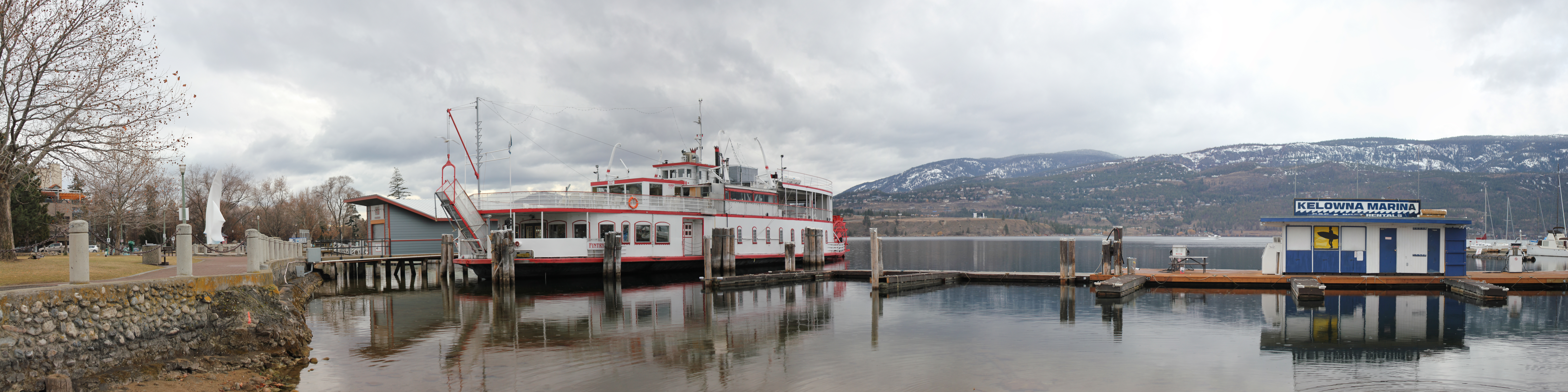
- Fintry Queen – 14 March 2011

History

Canada
- Name: Lequime; Fintry Queen
- Completed: 1947

General characteristics
- Type: Ferry

MV Lequime was a ferry that operated on Okanagan Lake in British Columbia, Canada. The most well-known of the long line of ferries on the lake, Lequime was built in 1947 and was later called Fintry Queen. Plans for the construction of Lequime began on May 1, 1946 and she was built in a fashion similar to the earlier MV Pendozi. Lequime carried cars and freight between the communities of Kelowna and Westbank with two other boats, MV Lloyd-Jones and Pendozi. However, the three struggled to carry the increasing load prior to the opening of the Okanagan Lake Bridge in 1958. After retirement, Lequime was renovated, a paddle wheel added to the stern, and used as a restaurant and for Okanagan Lake cruises.

== See also ==
- MV Aricia
- SS Clovelly (ferry)
- MV Grace Darling (1919)
- MV Grace Darling (1923)
