= MV Kelowna-Westbank =

Canadian government-operated ferry

History

Canada
- Namesake: Kelowna and Westbank, British Columbia
- Route: Okanagan Lake
- Builder: Department of Public Works
- Launched: February 21, 1927
- Nickname(s): MV Holdup
- Fate: Retired 1938

General characteristics
- Type: Ferry
- Tonnage: 104 tons
- Length: 94 ft (29 m)
- Beam: 32 ft (9.8 m)
- Capacity: 15 cars

MV Kelowna-Westbank was a diesel-powered ferry that operated on Okanagan Lake in British Columbia, Canada beginning in 1927. Although private ferry service had long been established on the lake, Kelowna-Westbank became the first provincial government-operated ferry upon her launch on February 21, 1927.

She was built by the Department of Public Works as a state-of-the-art vessel and was named after the communities Kelowna and Westbank, which she and the other ferries linked. She measured 94 feet (29 m) long by 32 feet (9.8 m) in beam and she was 104 tons. Kelowna-Westbank carried two life boats, one life raft, and had a capacity of 15 cars.

She solved transportation issues on Okanagan Lake for many years under Captain L. A. Hayman, but traffic steadily increased as the area developed and during the cold winters of the 1930s, she was often unable to provide service. In addition, her wooden hull had begun to deteriorate and she was nicknamed MV Holdup. By 1938, it was clear that Kelowna-Westbank was no longer able to keep up with demand and she was taken to the shipyard and Okanagan Landing for repairs. However, dry rot had damaged her irreparably and she was retired, with her machinery and equipment stored in Kelowna. The following year, Kelowna-Westbank's replacement, the steel ferry MV Pendozi, was built to continue the ferry service on Okanagan Lake.

== See also ==
- MV Aricia
- MV Lequime
