= MV Pendozi =

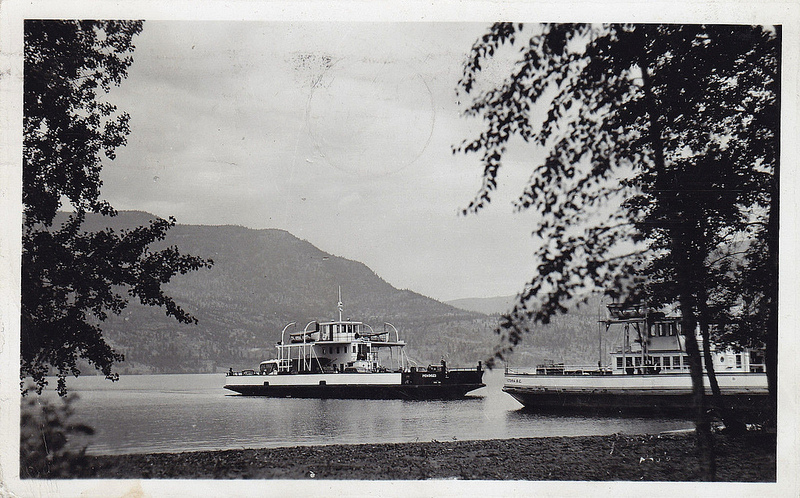
- MV Pendozi docking at Kelowna on Okanagan Lake, 1946

History

Canada
- Namesake: Charles Marie Pandosy

General characteristics
- Type: Ferry
- Length: 147 ft (45 m)
- Beam: 42 ft (13 m)
- Installed power: 2 × 150 hp (110 kW) Vivian engines
- Propulsion: 4 × screws
- Capacity: 30 cars

MV Pendozi was a ferry that operated on Okanagan Lake in British Columbia, Canada. The provincial government commissioned her in 1939 and she was the first steel ferry built for the run connecting the communities of Kelowna and Westbank. She was 147 feet (45 m) by 42 feet (13 m) and weighed 237.5 tons. She was powered by two 150 horsepower Vivian engines and had two life boats and two life rafts, as well as four propellers, two at each end of the ship. Pendozi could carry 30 cars. Kelowna residents suggested her name after Rev. Father Charles Marie Pandosy, O.M.I., who established Okanagan Mission, British Columbia in 1859. A street in Kelowna was also named Pendozi after him and the misspelling was never changed and even applied to the new ship because it reflected the proper pronunciation of his name. In the line of Kelowna-Westbank ferries, Pendozi came after MV Kelowna-Westbank and was later joined by MV Lloyd-Jones and MV Lequime. However, the three struggled to carry the increasing load prior to the opening of the Okanagan Lake Bridge in 1958. The retired ferry was later sold to Kelowna for a dollar, moored at a city dock, and used by the sea cadets. On New Year's Eve, 1964, vandals opened the seacocks, which sank the vessel. On refloating in the early new year, Pendozi was returned to rest in Westbank, and is now the clubhouse for the Westbank Yacht Club.
