= School District 23 =

School District 23 may refer to:

- Prospect Heights School District 23, a school district located and served in Prospect Heights, Illinois
- School District 23 Central Okanagan, a school district that serves the Central Okanagan, which includes Kelowna, for which the school district's office is based in
- Target Range School District 23, a school district in Montana

See also:

- Central Okanagan School District No 23 v Renaud, a related Canada Supreme Court decision
