= Grace Darling (disambiguation) =

Grace Darling (1815–1842) was an English lighthouse keeper's daughter.

Grace Darling may also refer to:

- Grace Darling: Maid and Myth, a 1965 biography by Richard Armstrong
- "Grace Darling" (song), a 1974 song by Strawbs
- MV Grace Darling (1919), a ferry that operated on Okanagan Lake in British Columbia
- MV Grace Darling (1923), a replacement for the 1919 ferry
- Grace Darling (actress) (1893–1963), American actress
- Grace Darkling, singer of Nocturna (band)
