= British Columbia (Superintendent of Motor Vehicles) v British Columbia (Council of Human Rights) =

- Supreme Court of Canada

Hearing: October 13, 1999 Judgment: December 16, 1999
- Full case name: Terry Grismer (Estate) v. The British Columbia Council of Human Rights (Member Designate Tom Patch) and The British Columbia Superintendent of Motor Vehicles and the Attorney General of British Columbia
- Citations: [1999] 3 S.C.R. 868
- Docket No.: 26481
- Prior history: Judgment against Grismer in the British Columbia Court of Appeal.
- Ruling: Appeal allowed.

Holding
- The Meiorin test applies to all types of discrimination, including discrimination outside of the employment context.

Court membership
- Chief Justice: Antonio Lamer; Puisne Justices: Claire L'Heureux-Dubé, Charles Gonthier, Beverley McLachlin, Frank Iacobucci, John C. Major, Michel Bastarache, Ian Binnie, Louise Arbour

Reasons given
- Unanimous reasons by: McLachlin J.
- Lamer C.J. and Arbour J. took no part in the consideration or decision of the case.

Laws applied
- British Columbia (Public Service Employee Relations Commission) v. BCGSEU, [1999] 3 S.C.R. 3

British Columbia (Superintendent of Motor Vehicles) v British Columbia (Council of Human Rights), [1999] 3 S.C.R. 868, known as the Grismer Estate case, is a leading Supreme Court of Canada decision on human rights law. The Court held that the British Columbia Superintendent of Motor Vehicles was in violation of the provincial Human Rights Code for cancelling the driver's licence of Terry Grismer because he had a visual disability.

== Background ==
Terry Grismer was a mining truck driver who, after suffering from a stroke in 1984, suffered from homonymous hemianopia (H.H.), a visual disability that reduces the scope of peripheral vision. After the stroke the Superintendent of Motor Vehicles cancelled his driver's licence on the grounds that his condition made him incapable of meeting the minimum standard for peripheral vision required when driving. This rule applied to all people who suffered from H.H.

Grismer brought a complaint to the Human Rights Commission for discrimination against the disabled. The Human Rights Tribunal found that the Superintendent directly discriminated and ordered a reassessment of his (Grismer's) visual abilities. A judge of the Supreme Court of British Columbia dismissed the Superintendent's petition for judicial review but the Court of Appeal set aside that decision.

Grismer's estate appealed to the Supreme Court of Canada. The issue before the Court was whether the complete prohibition against people with H.H. from driving was a reasonable standard under the requirements established in the Meiorin case.

== Reasons of the court ==
McLachlin, writing for a unanimous Court, found that the Superintendent discriminated against Grismer.

McLachlin found that the Meiorin test for determining if a standard is a bona fide occupational requirement applied not just in the employment context but to all circumstances of discrimination where accommodation may be available.

In considering Grismer's situation, McLachlin found that there was prima facie discrimination as his licence was cancelled on the basis of a disability. She then applied the Meiorin test and found that the discrimination was not justifiable. The goal of the prohibition was to protect the public which was rationally connected to the issuing of licences. The practice was also found to be in good faith. The standard failed the third step as it was not reasonably necessary to accomplish the goal. Furthermore, the Superintendent failed to show that any accommodation such as allowing individual testing would constitute undue hardship.
