= William R. Bennett Bridge =

Pontoon bridge across Okanagan Lake in British Columbia, Canada

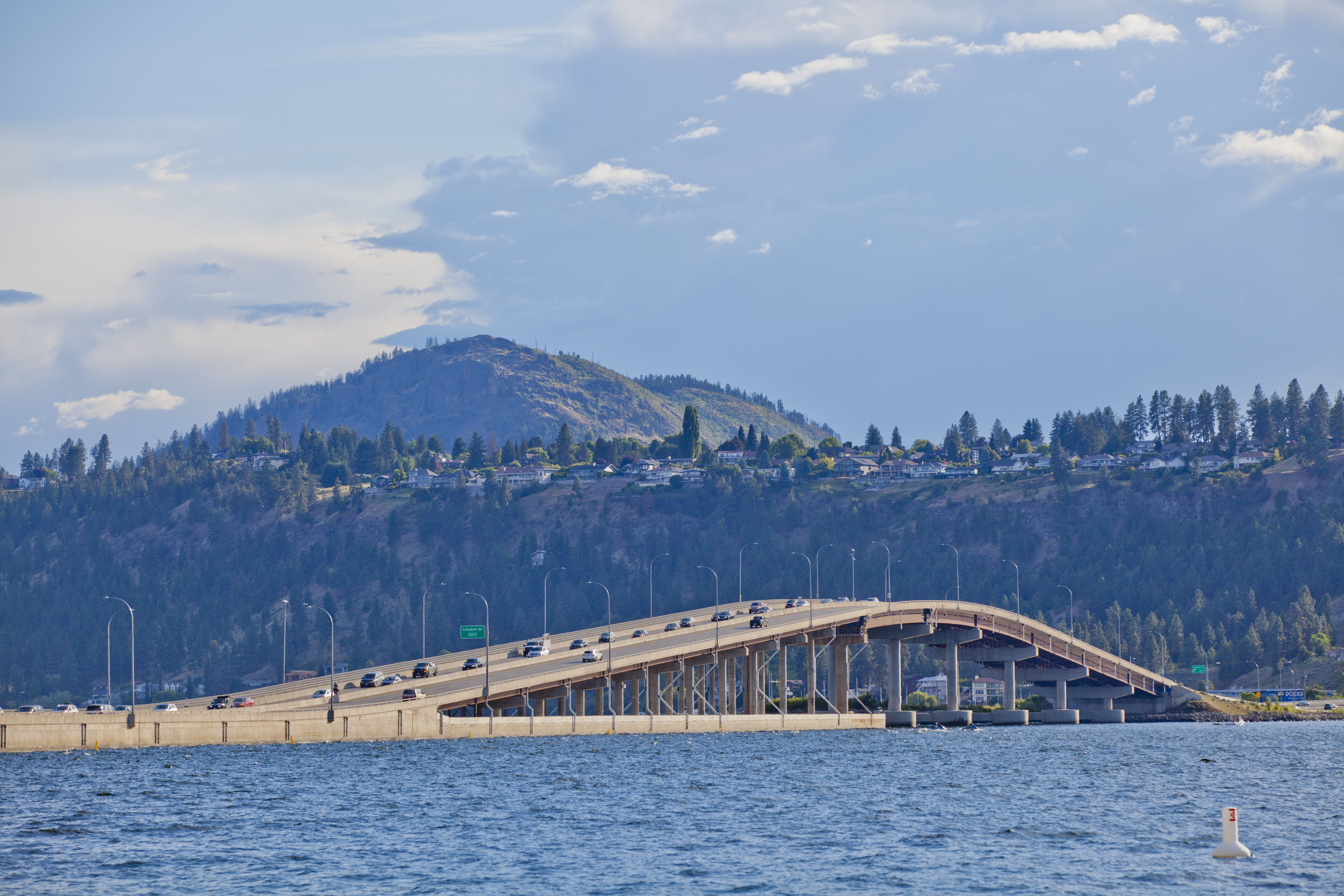
- The bridge seen from Kelowna City Park
- Coordinates: 49.879648°N 119.511852°W
- Carries: 5 lanes of Highway 97, pedestrians and bicycles
- Crosses: Okanagan Lake
- Locale: Kelowna, British Columbia, Canada
- Official name: William R. Bennett Bridge
- Maintained by: Protrans WRB Bridge (SNC-Lavalin)

Characteristics
- Design: Pontoon bridge
- Longest span: 44 metres (144 ft)
- Clearance below: 18 metres (59 ft)

History
- Opened: May 25, 2008

Statistics
- Daily traffic: 50,000 vehicles

Location
- Interactive map of William R. Bennett Bridge

The William R. Bennett Bridge is a pontoon bridge in the Okanagan Valley of British Columbia, Canada. Completed on May 25, 2008, the bridge replaced the older Okanagan Lake Bridge built in 1958 to link Downtown Kelowna to West Kelowna across Okanagan Lake as part of Highway 97.

On April 21, 2005, Premier Gordon Campbell officially renamed the bridge, then the Okanagan Lake Bridge, the William R. Bennett Bridge in honour of former premier Bill Bennett, a native of Kelowna.

== Construction budget ==
The first press release from the British Columbia Ministry of Transportation to include budget information was in 2003. At that time, the project was estimated to cost CA$100 million for the bridge and another $20 million for the two interchange upgrades on the west side of the lake.

By June 29, 2005, the cost of the bridge had increased from the previous estimate of $100 million to $144 million "due to dramatic increases in the cost of construction materials and labour", which included significant increases in the cost of concrete, steel, and fuel. Over the next 30 years, the province of British Columbia expected to pay SNC-Lavalin a total of $179 million "to design, build, finance, operate, maintain and rehabilitate the bridge".

== Construction schedule ==
- April 2005: Arthon Construction begins bridge end preloads from rock on Westside Road
- May 2005: Arthon completes east side preload
- June 2005: SNC-Lavalin is chosen to design, build, finance and operate the new bridge
- July 2005: Construction begins on a dry dock near Bear Creek Provincial Park, where the bridge pontoons will be built
- Q3 2005: Arthon completes preloads on west side of Okanagan Lake
- Q3 2005: Graving dock ready
- Q3 2006: Roadwork on both approaches begins
- Q4 2006: First four pontoons in place
- Q1 2007: Bridge deck construction begins
- Q4 2007: All pontoons in place
- Q4 2007: Roadwork on both approaches is completed
- Q1 2008: Bridge deck construction is completed
- Q2 2008: Test and commission
- Q2 2008: Bridge officially opens
  - Official opening scheduled for May 25, 2008
- Q2 2009: Decommission of the old bridge
- Q2 2009: Shoreline restoration

== Bridge facts ==
- Extending 1,060 metres (3,478 ft) long in total, the bridge includes a 690-metre (2,264 ft) string of long poles holding pontoons supporting an elevated deck
- At the deepest point near the middle of the bridge, the lake is approximately 60 metres (197 ft) deep
- There are a total of 9 concrete pontoons
- The pontoons are 25 metres (82 ft) wide and 60 to 90 metres (197 to 295 ft) long
- The navigation span on the west side of the bridge is 44 metres (144 ft) long and provides 18 metres (59 ft) of clearance between the bridge and the lake
- Three lanes are for westbound traffic
- Two lanes are for eastbound traffic
- An additional 1.3 metres (4 ft 3 in) wide pedestrian and cyclist pathway exists on the south (eastbound) side of the bridge
- The west side of the bridge has a pedestrian, cyclist, and vehicle underpass at Campbell Road and another interchange at Westside Road
- The Kelowna side of the bridge retains the existing pedestrian and cyclist underpass between City Park and Lake Avenue
- The new bridge was designed to handle up to 80,000 vehicles daily; the old Okanagan Lake Bridge was designed to handle 38,000 vehicles daily but, in 2005, handled approximately 50,000 vehicles daily
- The bridge is maintained by Protrans WRB Bridge, which is a subsidiary of SNC-Lavalin

== Gallery ==
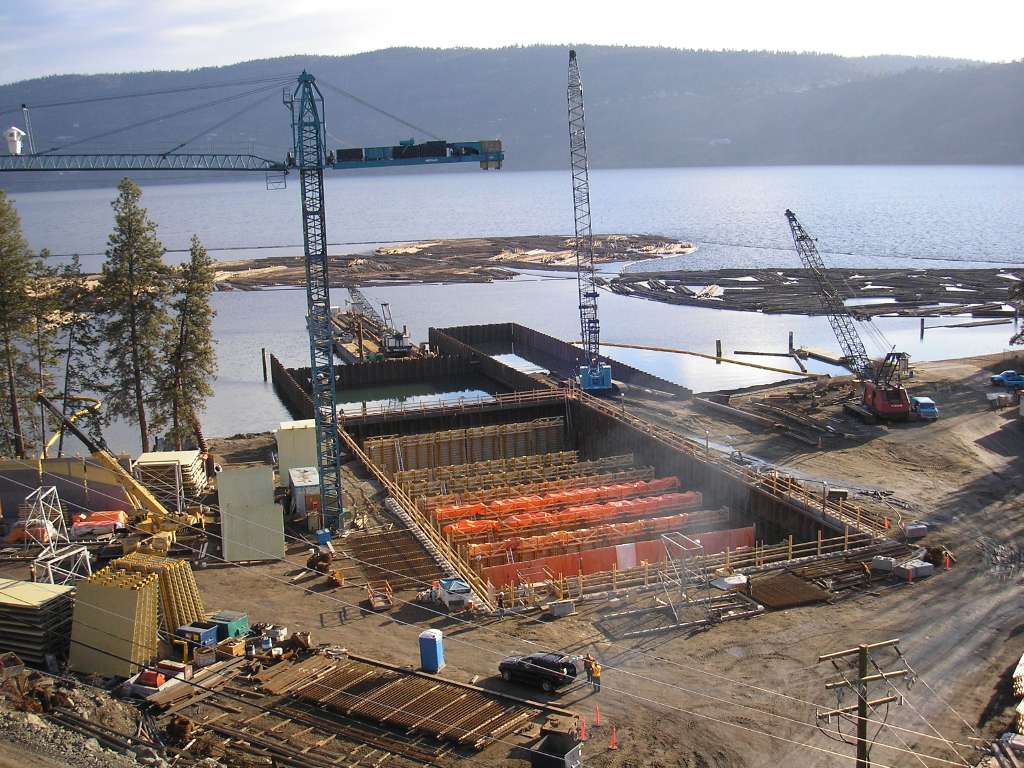
Construction of concrete pontoon #2 in February 2006

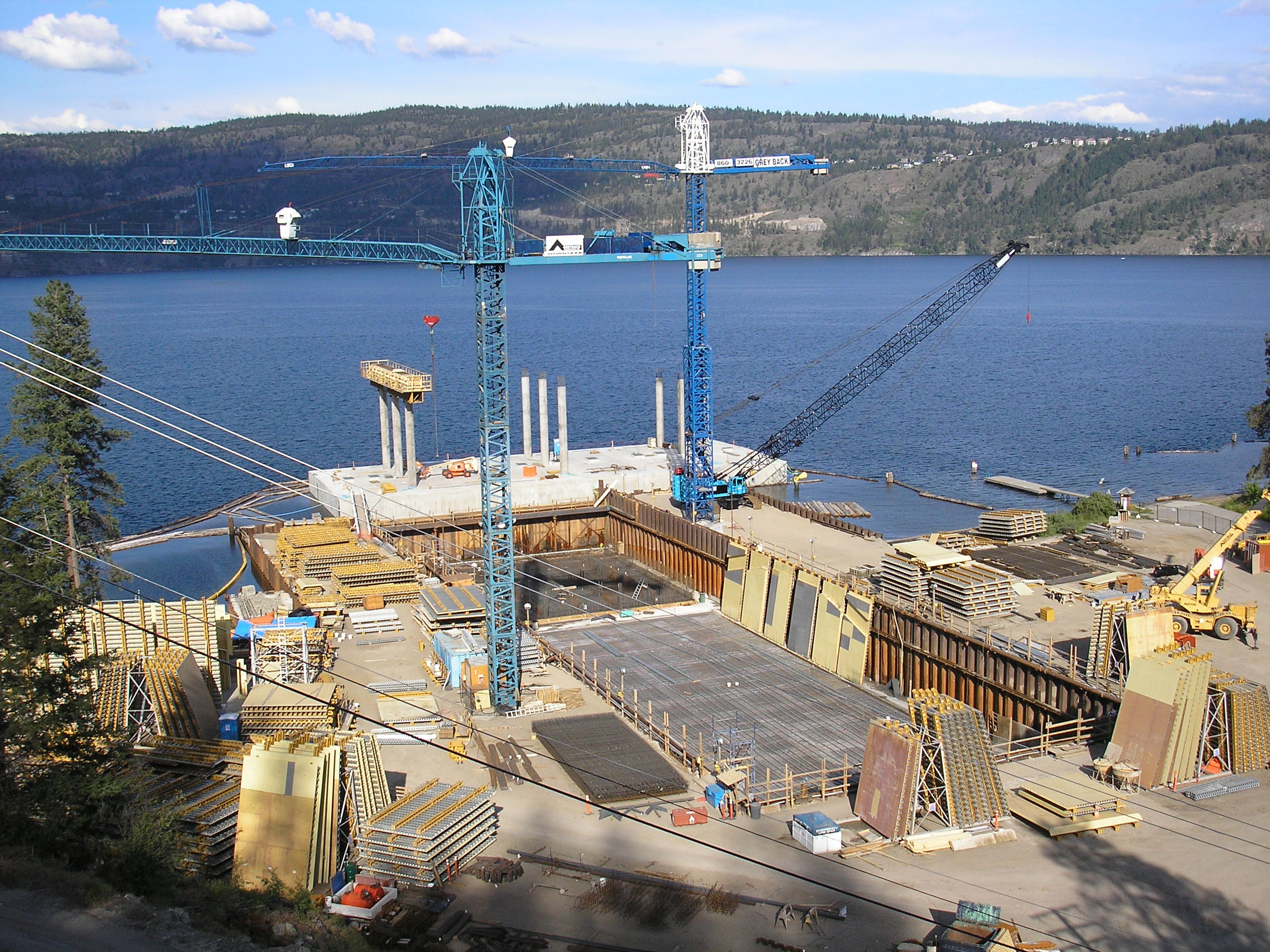
Roadway towers under construction on top of pontoon #2 in June 2006

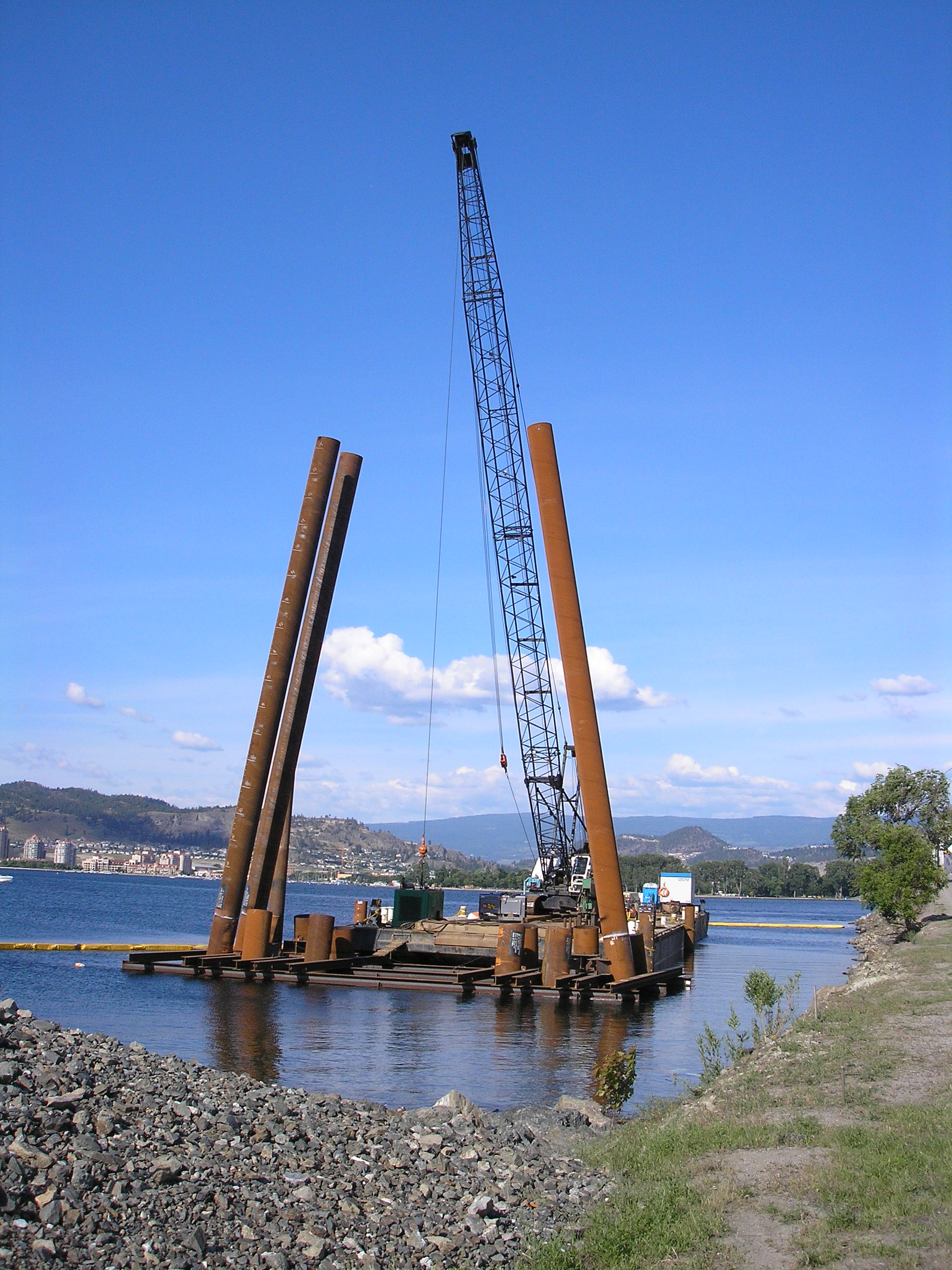
Pile driving where the west side approach was built

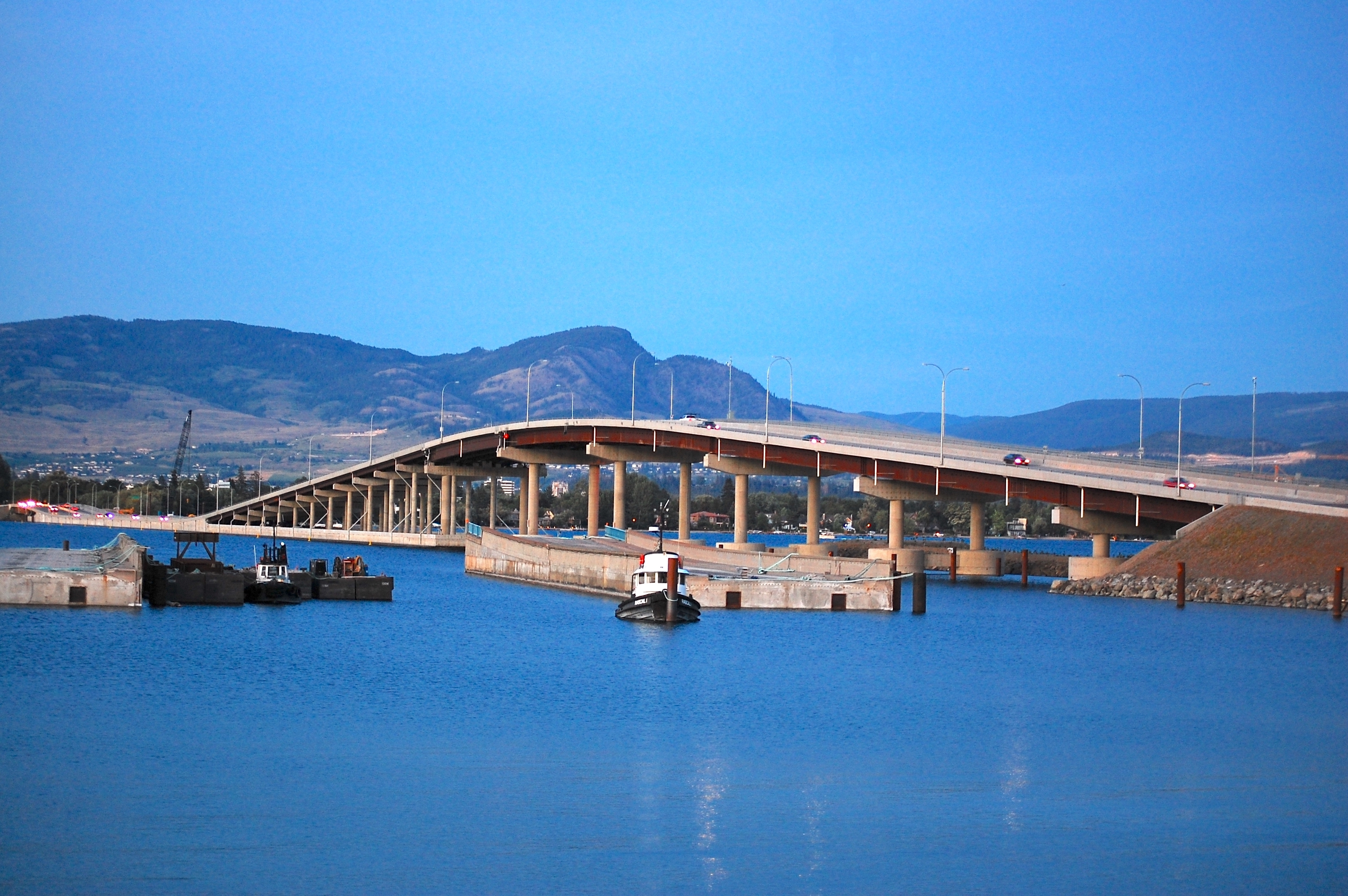
Bridge from West Kelowna, with parts of the original bridge in the foreground

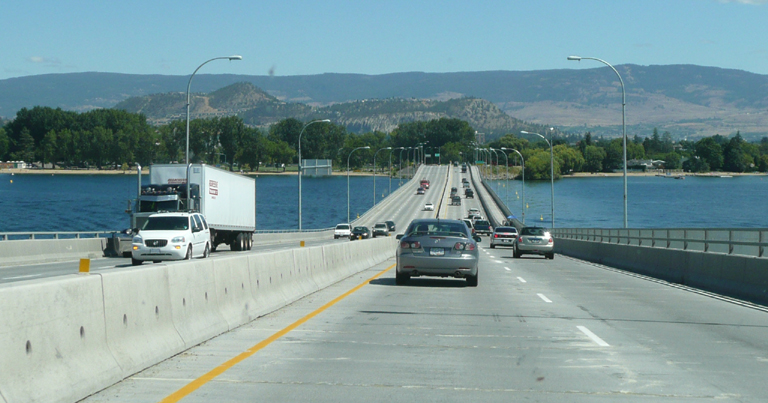
Heading eastbound on the completed bridge

== See also ==
- List of bridges in Canada
