= Reasonable accommodation =

Changes to a system to accommodate someone with a need

A reasonable accommodation is an adjustment made in a system to accommodate or make fair the same system for an individual based on a proven need that does not cause significant change or burden to the system. Accommodations can be religious, physical, mental or emotional, academic, or employment-related, and law often mandates them. Each country has its own definition of reasonable accommodations. The United Nations use this term in the Convention on the Rights of Persons with Disabilities, saying refusal to make accommodation results in discrimination. It defines a "reasonable accommodation" as:

... necessary and appropriate modification and adjustments not imposing a disproportionate or undue burden, where needed in a particular case, to ensure to persons with disabilities the enjoyment or exercise on an equal basis with others of all human rights and fundamental freedoms;

"Disproportionate or undue burden" and similar terms are common in all definitions of reasonable accommodation. The ambiguity of what constitutes a significant change or burden to the facilitator is a contentious topic. Some view the terminology as being strictly biased towards not altering the facilitator's system, denying accommodations for those that need them. Other views argue it is necessary to prevent abuse, and to make it more attractive for employers and institutions to admit people with accommodation needs.

== Financial costs ==
Employers and managers are often concerned about the potential cost associated with providing accommodations to employees with disabilities. However, many accommodations, such as moving an employee to a different desk or changing the work schedule, do not have any direct cash costs (56% in a survey of employers conducted by JAN), and most others have only one-time costs (e.g., to buy a different style of computer mouse). Accommodation costs may be offset by the savings associated with employing people with disabilities (higher performance, lower turnover costs).

== Competing accommodation needs ==
Rarely, two people will need accommodations that conflict with each other. Creative problem solving may be required to find ways to accommodate both people. For example, the United States Department of Justice recommends that if a program serves a person with a service dog and a person who is allergic to dogs, that the program separate them physically, by asking them to stay in different rooms or on opposite sides of the same room, with access to the same resources. In some cases, the accommodations that are practical may not be the first choice for all participants. For example, a person who has a hearing impairment may not be able to understand the artificial voice generated by the text-to-speech device used by a person who is unable to speak, so they may have to find a way to communicate that does not rely on that device, even if the non-speaking person would prefer to use that device.

== United Kingdom ==
The laws of England, Wales, Scotland and Northern Ireland require employers to make reasonable accommodations for disabled employees, as well as providers of various services (including schools, colleges and universities) to do likewise for disabled pupils, students and service users. This duty originally arose under the Disability Discrimination Act 1995, and is now dealt with by the Equality Act 2010 (except in Northern Ireland). Failure to do so can give rise to a complaint by an employee to an employment tribunal or to the civil courts or other tribunals (in non-employment contexts).

== Canada ==
In Canada, women have the right to keep their hair covered as a religious accommodation. Students can wear a close-fitting sports hijab as part of their uniform while participating in physical education classes and team sports programs.

In Canada equality rights, as set out in provincial and federal anti-discrimination laws and in section 15 of the Canadian Charter of Rights and Freedoms, require that accommodation be made to various minorities. With a new addition being "family status" being included as well. (The origin of the term reasonable accommodation in Canadian law is found in its labour law jurisprudence, specifically Ontario (Human Rights Commission) v Simpsons-Sears Ltd, [1985] 2 SCR 536, and is argued to be the obligation of employers to change some general rules for certain employees, under the condition that this does not cause "undue hardship".) In Canada reasonable accommodation also means a legal and constitutional concept that requires Canadian public institutions to adapt to the religious and cultural practices of minorities as long as these practices do not violate the other rights and freedoms.

In Québec the Bouchard-Taylor Commission examined the subject of reasonable accommodation due to religious and cultural differences.

== United States ==
In the United States, federal law requires that reasonable accommodations be made by providers of employment, education, or housing; and in courts and other public venues.

=== Education ===
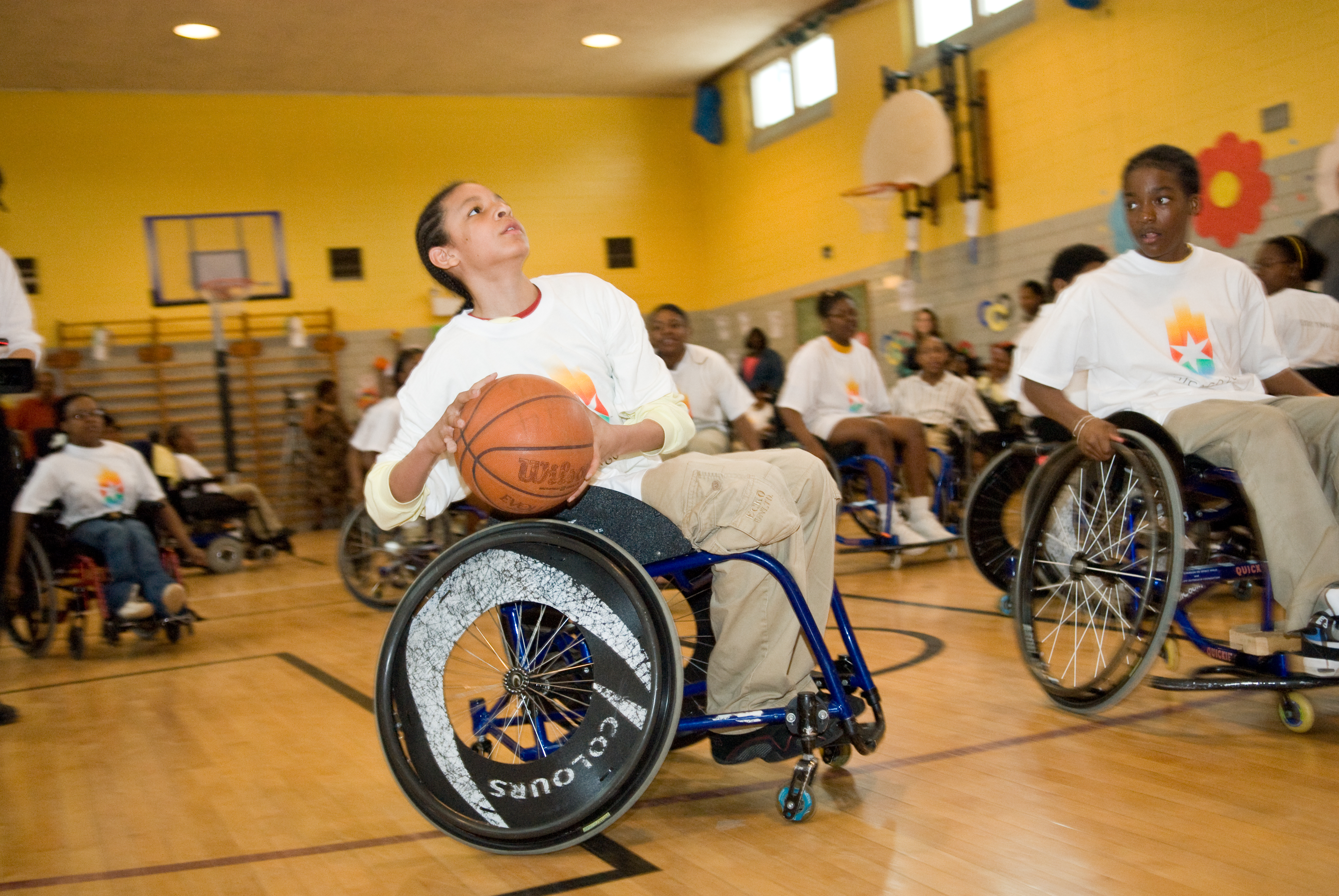
Students with disabilities can attend school.

Students are protected against discrimination on the basis of disability under US federal law. Different laws apply to younger students (before high school graduation) and to college students. Younger students are protected by the Individuals with Disabilities Education Act (IDEA) as well as other federal laws. These students, who may be as young as three years old, may have an Individualized Education Program (IEP) or a 504 plan, both of which are essentially agreements between the students' families and their schools that state what the students' needs are and how those needs will be addressed at school. Younger students are entitled to more support from the school, including some medical and personal services, compared to students attending a college or university, who are entitled only to accommodations necessary due to a disability. For example, a young child might be taught social skills in elementary school, or a teenager might be coached on organizational skills or time management, but after high school, students are not entitled to have schools provide these services. After high school, IDEA no longer applies, and the Americans with Disabilities Act of 1990 becomes more relevant.

In special education, a distinction is made between accommodation and modification. An accommodation provides the same educational work, but in a way that accommodates their disabilities. For example, a student with limited vision may be given a large-print book. This student reads the same work of literature as everyone else in the class, but the student is able to see the words on the page because of the larger type. Similarly, a student with an episodic disability (one that occasionally flares up intensely for a brief time) may be allowed, if the student becomes ill just before a deadline, to turn in an assignment a few days late, just like a student who had gotten sick with a viral infection such as COVID-19 or influenza would normally be allowed to turn in an assignment shortly after recovering from the infection. These students do the same work, just on a slightly different schedule. An unlimited exemption from turning in any assignment on time, on the other hand, is "would not be a reasonable accommodation". At the university level, common accommodations include flexible deadlines, recording lectures, extra time on tests for slow readers, taking a test in a quiet room, and receiving a copy of lecture notes taken by another (frequently paid) student.

A modification differs from accommodations by changing the curriculum, usually to make it easier for a student who is unable to complete the normal work. For example, if the class is reading one of Shakespeare's plays, then a student with an intellectual disability may be given a specially simplified, shortened version of the original play. This allows the student to participate partially in the regular educational curriculum, but in a way that has been changed because of the student's individual limitations.

=== Employment ===
The Americans With Disabilities Act, known as ADA, was signed into law on 26 July 1990. It carried forward material from Section 504 of the Rehabilitation Act of 1973. A reasonable accommodation is defined by the US Department of Justice as "change or adjustment to a job or work environment that permits a qualified applicant or employee with a disability to participate in the job application process, to perform the essential functions of a job, or to enjoy benefits and privileges of employment equal to those enjoyed by employees without disabilities."

=== State and local government services, programs, and activities ===
Title II of the ADA provides that "no qualified individual with a disability shall, by reason of such disability, be excluded from participation in or be denied the benefits of the services, programs, or activities of a public entity, or be subject to discrimination by any such entity". State and local governments must provide reasonable accommodations to ensure such access, unless a fundamental alteration would result.

=== Public accommodations ===
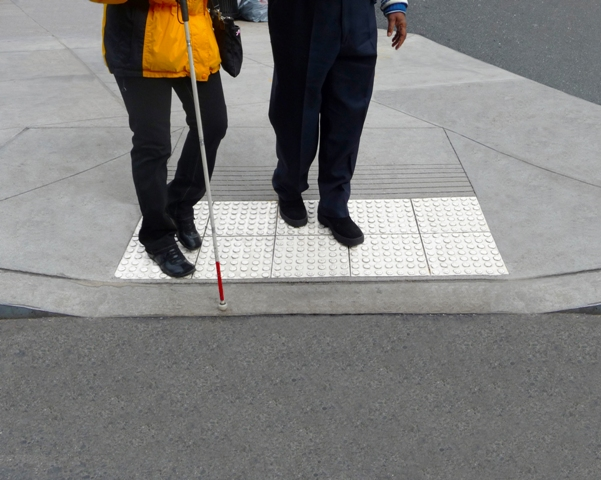
Tactile paving is used to alert blind people to the edge of the sidewalk. This helps people participate in everyday activities, like walking through the neighborhood.

Title III of the ADA requires private businesses open to the public and commercial facilities to provide reasonable accommodations to people with disabilities to ensure that they have equal access to goods and services.

=== Housing ===
Under Title VIII of the Civil Rights Act of 1968, as amended by the Fair Housing Amendments Act of 1988, codified in the United States Code at 42 USC §§ 3601–3619, and commonly known as the Fair Housing Act, virtually all housing providers must make reasonable accommodations in their rules, policies, practices, or services under certain circumstances. A reasonable accommodation must be granted when such an accommodation is necessary to afford a prospective or existing tenant with a disability an opportunity to use and enjoy a dwelling (including but not limited to apartments, single family homes, and other types of private and public housing) to the same extent as a person who does not have that disability. The Fair Housing Act covers "dwellings", and in many situations that term encompasses such non-traditional housing as homeless shelters and college dormitories. It bears noting that in regard to larger dwellings such as apartment buildings, the right to a reasonable accommodation under the Fair Housing Act requires that housing providers grant a requested reasonable accommodation that is necessary to enable a disabled tenant to enjoy an indoor or outdoor common area to the same extent as a non-disabled tenant enjoys such areas.

== See also ==
- Inclusion (disability rights)
- Interactive accommodation process
