= Lakeview Heights, West Kelowna =

Lakeview Heights
- Neighbourhood
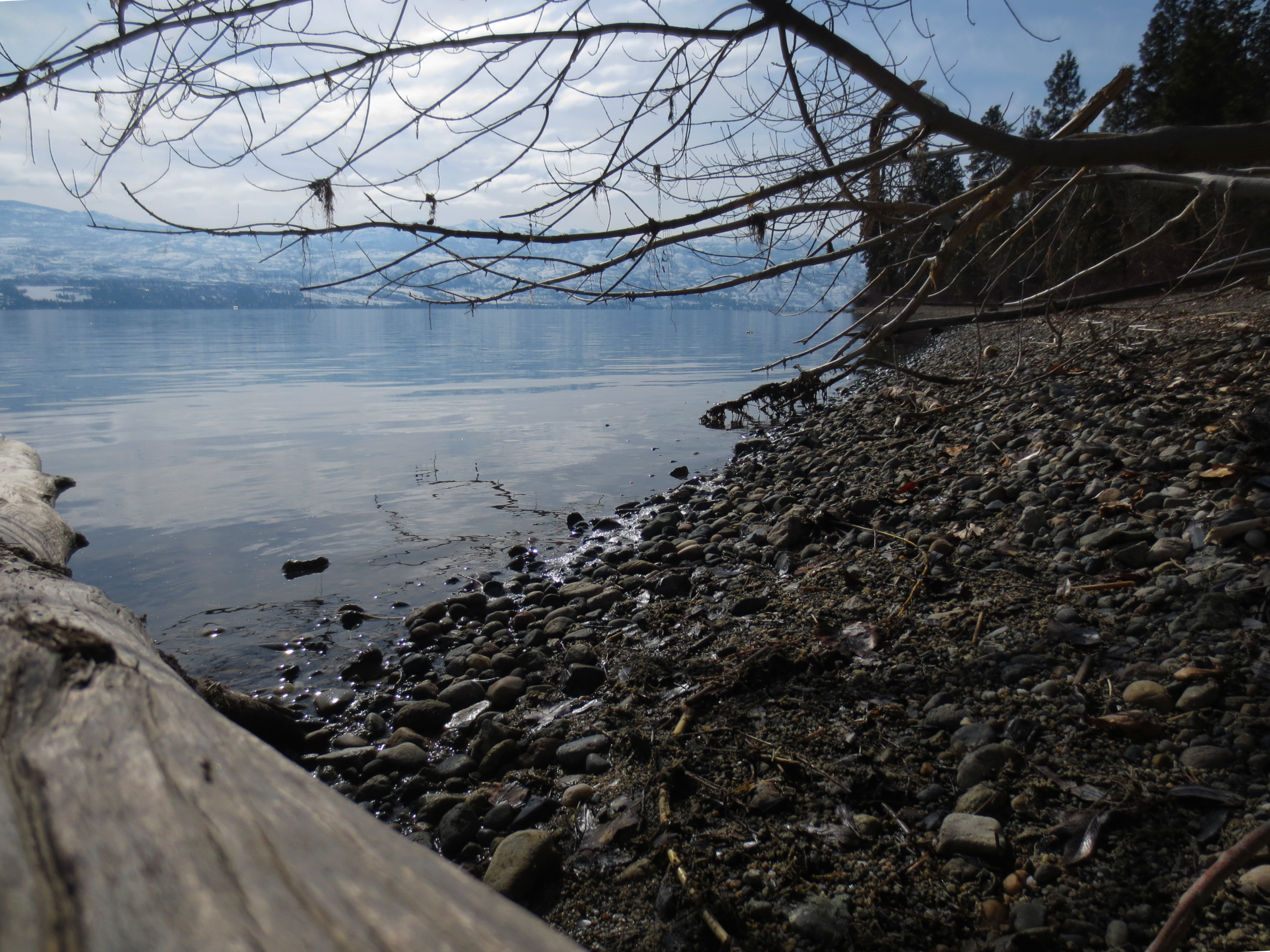
- Early Spring Flotsam on the Okanagan Lakeshore in Lakeview Heights
- Interactive map of Lakeview Heights
- Coordinates: 49°52′00″N 119°32′00″W
- Country: Canada
- Province: British Columbia
- Regional district: Central Okanagan
- City: West Kelowna
- Time zone: UTC−07:00 (PT)

Lakeview Heights is a community within the City of West Kelowna, British Columbia, Canada. Lakeview Heights is on the west side of Okanagan Lake, across the lake from Kelowna. Lakeview Heights is east of Mount Boucherie and south of Tsinstikeptum Indian Reserve No. 10.

Residents representation is through the Lakeview Heights Community Association, a resident/member operated grassroots non-profit Special Interest Group. Member volunteers monitor and lobby government and are participants in local Public Advisory Councils and Committees. Many members volunteer their time and attend Community Open Houses, Government Information events, Community Issue Forums, and many participate and represent the LHCA on Public Advisory Committees.

Lakeview Heights is home to orchards, riding stables, vineyards and wineries. Lakeview Heights has a standalone Lakeview Heights Community Hall, and a small shopping centre often referred to as the Anders Store due to its location. There are sports fields, tennis courts, parks and access to Okanagan Lake. Lakeview Heights is known for the panoramic views of surrounding areas and communities. Lakeview Heights with the many views of Okanagan Lake is often used by tourists to monitor and report on the travels of Ogopogo, a mythical inland sea monster.

The Lakeview Irrigation District is the provider of local water needs.

Lakeview Heights got its name from a winning contest entry from Geoff Gray in 1951..

In October 2025 West Kelowna officially opened the recently built Lakeview Heights fire hall, a project that took about 14.3 million to make.
