= Central Alberta Dairy Pool v Alberta (Human Rights Commission) =

- Supreme Court of Canada

Hearing: September 13, 1990 Judgment: October 13, 1990
- Citations: [1990] 2 SCR 489
- Prior history: appeal from the court of appeal for alberta
- Ruling: Commission appeal allowed

Court membership
- Chief Justice: Brian Dickson; Puisne Justices: Antonio Lamer, Bertha Wilson, Gérard La Forest, Claire L'Heureux-Dubé, John Sopinka, Charles Gonthier, Peter Cory, Beverley McLachlin

Reasons given
- Majority: Wilson J, joined by Dickson CJ and L'Heureux‑Dubé and Cory JJ
- Concurrence: Sopinka J, joined by La Forest and McLachlin JJ

Central Alberta Dairy Pool v Alberta (Human Rights Commission), [1990] 2 SCR 489, is a leading human rights law decision of the Supreme Court of Canada. The Court expanded on the concept of accommodation up to undue hardship first established in Ontario (Human Rights Commission) v Simpsons-Sears Ltd, [1985] 2 SCR 536 and provided a set of factors to consider when evaluating undue hardship.

== Background ==
Jim Christie was an employee at an Albertan Dairy Plant since 1980. In 1983, he joined the Worldwide Church of God and as part of his observance of the faith, he had to take a number of days off work. The Dairy Plant was initially accommodating, but when he tried to take off a Monday, which was the busiest day of the week, it refused to let him off and told him that if he did not show up to work, he would be fired. Christie did not show up on Monday and, when he returned from work on Tuesday, his job was filled with a new employee.

Christie submitted a complaint under the Individual's Rights Protection Act ("Act") for dismissal based on religious grounds. The Board of Inquiry ordered that Christie be compensated for lost wages. On appeal, the Court of Appeal for Ontario held that attendance on Mondays was a bona fide occupational requirement and therefore a valid ground for just cause termination.

The issues before the Supreme Court were whether the Dairy Plant could justify the termination on the basis the requirement that Christie work on Mondays is a bona fide occupational requirement under section 7(3) of the Act and, if not, whether it still open to the respondent to demonstrate it had accommodated the complainant's religious beliefs up to the point of undue hardship and if so, whether the Dairy Plant reasonably accommodated Christie's religious beliefs.

== Opinion of the Court ==
Wilson J, writing for the majority, held there was no bona fide occupational requirement for Monday attendance and that the dairy farm did not accommodate to the point of undue hardship.

Wilson described the situation of one of adverse effect discrimination, which she defined as "a rule that is neutral on its face but has an adverse effect on certain members of the group to whom it applies". Monday attendance, she found, was an isolated incident and there was no evidence that it would be a recurring event. Thus, it was not a bona fide occupational requirement.

She then considered whether the dairy farm accommodated Christie to the point of undue hardship. She observed it was not necessary to provide a comprehensive definition of undue hardship and instead gave a list of factors:

1. financial costs of accommodation
2. disruption of the collective agreement
3. problems of morale of other employees
4. interchangeability of work force and facilities
5. size of the employer's operation (which may also influence the other factors, such as whether the financial cost is undue or the difficulty in adapting the work force or facilities to accommodate individuals)
6. safety concerns

== See also ==
- List of Supreme Court of Canada cases (Lamer Court)
