= Okanagan Lake Shopping Centre =

Shopping plaza in British Columbia, Canada

Coordinates: 49.8796°N 119.5361°W

Okanagan Lake Shopping Centre is a shopping plaza located in West Kelowna, British Columbia, Canada.
