= Mount Boucherie Senior Secondary School =

Mount Boucherie Secondary

Location
- 2751 Cameron Rd; West Kelowna, British Columbia, V1Z 2T6; Canada; 49.85823°N 119.58431°W

Information
- School type: Public, high school
- Motto: Respect – Integrity – Responsibility
- Opened: 1975
- School board: School District 23 Central Okanagan
- Superintendent: Jon Rever
- School number: 2323051
- Principal: Ryan Mansley
- Grades: 9-12
- Enrollment: 1773 (2025/2026)
- Language: English
- Colours: Blue, White, and Red
- Mascot: Boomer the Grizzly bear
- Team name: Mount Boucherie Bears
- Website: https://mbs.sd23.bc.ca/
- Last updated: October 3, 2026

Mount Boucherie Senior Secondary School is a public high school in West Kelowna, British Columbia, part of School District No. 23 (Central Okanagan). Its mascot is the Grizzly bear.

== History ==
The school was founded in 1975 as a five-year high school (grades 8-12 inclusive), and was originally known as Mount Boucherie Secondary School (MBSS). The school is located at the foot of the north side of Mount Boucherie, which stands between the school and Okanagan Lake.

Prior to the construction of MBSS, the sole high school on the west side of the lake was George Pringle Secondary School in Westbank. As the former orchard lands of the west side were converted into subdivisions (in particular, "Lakeview Heights") subsequent to the construction of Okanagan Lake Floating Bridge (1955) linking the west side to Kelowna by car, a growing population of students was required to travel either to Westbank, or to Kelowna Secondary School downtown. MBSS opened in 1975 and relieved the crowding at George Pringle in particular, where from 1973 classes had been divided into two "shifts" to accommodate overflow.

The original school has been extensively renovated and expanded. In 1975, the buildings were organized around a central grass courtyard. They included a trades or "shops" building with woodwork, metal work, automotive mechanics, and drafting rooms; a gymnasium with a mezzanine for weights and mat training and rock climbing; a multipurpose room with a stage which opened either to the interior of the multipurpose room or to an open-air amphitheatre, a music room adjoining the gym; and a two-storey academic building containing liberal arts and humanities classrooms, library and administration on the upper floor and science laboratories on the lower.

The first principal of MBSS was Cecil "Cec" Plotnikoff.

In the school's early years, MBSS as a new "single A" (denoting smaller size) school went through the normal development and "newness" of academic programs, team sports, and club and social activities, being measured or competing against larger and better established schools such as KSS with limited success. However, even in the mid to late 1970s there were notable achievements which ranked the school near the top of the local or provincial heap in several areas. These included the volleyball program, which was consistently competitive at a provincial level (under the guidance of Barry Kingsley), and the debating program (organized by Colin Castle) which produced top-level debaters from the school's beginnings.

== Notable alumni ==
- Matt Carter, CFL player
- Danny Watkins, NFL player
- Justin Schultz, National Hockey League (NHL) player
