= British Columbia (Public Service Employee Relations Commission) v British Columbia Government Service Employees' Union =

- Supreme Court of Canada

Hearing: February 22, 1999 Judgment: September 9, 1999
- Full case name: The British Columbia Government and Service Employees' Union v. The Government of the Province of British Columbia as represented by the Public Service Employee Relations Commission
- Citations: [1999] 3 SCR 3; (1999), 176 DLR (4th) 1; [1999] 10 WWR 1; (1999), 35 CHRR 257; (1999), 46 CCEL (2d) 206; (1999), 68 CRR (2d) 1; (1999), 66 BCLR (3d) 253
- Docket No.: 26274
- Prior history: Judgment for the Public Service Employee Relations Commission in the British Columbia Court of Appeal.
- Ruling: Appeal allowed

Holding
- There is a three-step process for determining if an employer can establish that a discriminatory standard is an occupational requirement: (1) The standard must be rationally connected to performance of the job, (2) The employer adopted the standard in an honest and good-faith manner, and (3) The standard is reasonably necessary to accomplish the legitimate work-related purpose.

Court membership
- Chief Justice: Antonio Lamer; Puisne Justices: Claire L'Heureux-Dubé, Charles Gonthier, Peter Cory, Beverley McLachlin, Frank Iacobucci, John C. Major, Michel Bastarache, Ian Binnie

Reasons given
- Unanimous reasons by: McLachlin J.

British Columbia (Public Service Employee Relations Commission) v British Columbia Government Service Employees' Union [1999] 3 SCR 3, 1999 SCC 48 – called Meiorin for short – is a Supreme Court of Canada case that created a unified test to determine if a violation of human rights legislation can be justified as a bona fide occupational requirement (BFOR).

== Background ==
Before Meiorin, Human Rights violations were treated in one of two ways; either as "direct discrimination", pursuant to the analysis in Ontario (Human Rights Commission) v Etobicoke (Borough of), [1982] 1 SCR 202; or as "adverse effects discrimination", pursuant to the analysis in Ontario (Human Rights Commission) v Simpsons-Sears Ltd, [1985] 2 SCR 536. Academic writing deeply criticized this bifurcation of analysis as arbitrary and unhelpful in protecting equality rights. With the Meiorin case, the court decided to confront this criticism and refashion the analysis.

=== Facts ===
Tawney Meiorin was employed as a firefighter by the British Columbia Ministry of Forests. Three years after being hired, the government adopted a series of fitness tests that all employees were required to pass. She passed all the tests except for one that required her to run 2.5 km in 11 minutes. After four attempts, her best time was 49.4 seconds over the maximum allowed. As a result, she was fired.

== Reasoning of the Court ==
Though the fitness tests had a valid purpose of ensuring safety, the court found that the research that the tests were based on was incomplete and "impressionistic" and did not take into account the differences between men and women in establishing a standard.

To reach this conclusion, the court examined the previous methods of analyzing Human Rights violations, noting where they were deficient, and then proposed a new "Meiorin Test" to which the current facts are applied.

McLachlin J (as she then was) noted that the greatest deficiency in having two different approaches is that one afforded a greater amount of remedy than the other which provoked parties to abuse this distinction. There was the further problem that it had the overall effect of legitimizing systemic discrimination. As well, it created a dissonance between Human Rights analysis and Charter analysis.

== Meiorin test ==
An employer can justify the impugned standard by establishing on the balance of probabilities:

1. that the employer adopted the standard for a purpose rationally connected to the performance of the job;
2. that the employer adopted the particular standard in an honest and good faith belief that it was necessary to the fulfilment of that legitimate work-related purpose; and
3. that the standard was reasonably necessary to the accomplishment of that legitimate work-related purpose. To show that the standard is reasonably necessary, it must be demonstrated that it is impossible to accommodate individual employees sharing the characteristics of the claimant without imposing undue hardship upon the employer.

(per McLachlin, emphasis added)

=== Rational connection ===
In practice, this step has been shown to be easily satisfied. It is mostly used to motivate the parties to identify what the general purpose or goal of the standard is, and will only fail in the most egregious cases. This step has a close connection to the "rational connection" inquiry within the Oakes test which has been shown to have similar effect.

=== Good faith ===
This step addresses the subjective element of test. Though it is not essential to the determination of a BFOR it captures many "direct discrimination" cases.

=== Undue hardship ===
This step is the most decisive of them all. It must show that reasonable alternatives and accommodations have been looked into and reasonably dismissed due to undue hardship.

Sopinka J, in Central Okanagan School District No 23 v Renaud [1992] 2 SCR 970, stated, "[T]he use of the term 'undue' infers that some hardship is acceptable; it is only 'undue' hardship that satisfies this test." The exact measurement of undue hardship is the combination of a variety of factors. Wilson J identified several in Alberta Dairy Pool including financial costs of accommodations, interchangeability of the workforce and facilities, and the interference of other employees rights.

At paragraph 65 of Meiorin, McLachlin J suggests six lines of inquiry to consider:

1. Has the employer investigated alternative approaches that do not have a discriminatory effect, such as individual testing against a more individually sensitive standard?
2. If alternative standards were investigated and found to be capable of fulfilling the employer's purpose, why were they not implemented?
3. Is it necessary to have all employees meet the single standard for the employer to accomplish its legitimate purpose or could standards reflective of group or individual differences and capabilities be established?
4. Is there a way to do the job that is less discriminatory while still accomplishing the employer's legitimate purpose?
5. Is the standard properly designed to ensure that the desired qualification is met without placing an undue burden on those to whom the standard applies?
6. Have other parties who are obliged to assist in the search for possible accommodation fulfilled their roles? As Sopinka J. noted in Renaud, supra, at pp. 992–96, the task of determining how to accommodate individual differences may also place burdens on the employee and, if there is a collective agreement, a union.

== See also ==
- List of Supreme Court of Canada cases
