= School District 23 Central Okanagan =

School district in British Columbia, Canada

- School District 23 Central Okanagan logo

Location
- Kelowna Kelowna, West Kelowna, Lake Country, and Peachland British Columbia; Canada
- Coordinates: 49.888°N 119.495°W

District information
- Superintendent
- School board: 7 members
- Chair of the board: Moyra Baxter
- Schools: 31 elementary, 6 middle, 5 secondary, and 1 alternative school
- Budget: CA$221.1 million

Students and staff
- Students: 21,736
- Teachers: 1,301
- Staff: 1,517

Other information
- Website: www.sd23.bc.ca

School District 23 Central Okanagan is a school district in the Okanagan valley of British Columbia. It includes the cities of Kelowna, and West Kelowna, and the District Municipalities of Lake Country, and Peachland, and is the 5th largest district in BC. The boundaries of the school district are identical to those of the Regional District of Central Okanagan.

== Schools ==
School	Location	Grades	FR Immersion	Website
A S Matheson Elementary School	Kelowna	K-6	No	https://asm.sd23.bc.ca/
Anne McClymont Elementary School	Kelowna	K-5	No	https://ame.sd23.bc.ca/
Bankhead Elementary School	Kelowna	K-6	No	https://bhe.sd23.bc.ca/
Belgo Elementary School	Kelowna	K-6	Yes	https://bge.sd23.bc.ca/
Bellevue Creek Elementary	Kelowna	K-2	Yes	https://bce.sd23.bc.ca/
Black Mountain Elementary School	Kelowna	K-5	No	https://bme.sd23.bc.ca/
Canyon Falls Middle School	Kelowna	6-8	No	https://cms.sd23.bc.ca/
Casorso Elementary School	Kelowna	K-6	Yes	https://cas.sd23.bc.ca/
Central School Programs	Kelowna	8-12	No	https://cps.sd23.bc.ca/
Chief Tomat Elementary	West Kelowna	K-5	No	https://cte.sd23.bc.ca/
Chute Lake Elementary School	Kelowna	K-5	No	https://cle.sd23.bc.ca/
Constable Neil Bruce Middle School	West Kelowna	6-8	No (ELL)	https://cnb.sd23.bc.ca/
Davidson Road Elementary School	Lake Country (Winfield)	K-5	No	https://dre.sd23.bc.ca/
Dorothea Walker Elementary School	Kelowna	3-6	Yes	https://dwe.sd23.bc.ca/
Dr. Knox Middle School	Kelowna	7-9	Yes	https://drk.sd23.bc.ca/
Ellison Elementary School	Kelowna	K-5	No	https://ele.sd23.bc.ca/
George Elliot Secondary School	Lake Country (Winfield)	9-12	Yes	https://ges.sd23.bc.ca/
Glenmore Elementary School	Kelowna	K-6	Yes	https://gme.sd23.bc.ca/
Glenrosa Elementary School	West Kelowna	K-5	Yes	https://gre.sd23.bc.ca/
Glenrosa Middle School	West Kelowna	6-9	Yes	https://gms.sd23.bc.ca/
Helen Gorman Elementary School	West Kelowna	K-5	No	https://hge.sd23.bc.ca/
H S Grenda Middle School	Lake Country	6-8	Yes	https://hms.sd23.bc.ca/
Hudson Road Elementary School	Kelowna	K-5	Yes	https://hre.sd23.bc.ca/
Kelowna Senior Secondary School	Kelowna	10-12	Yes	https://kss.sd23.bc.ca/
KLO Middle School	Kelowna	7-9	Yes	https://klo.sd23.bc.ca/
Mar Jok Elementary School	West Kelowna	K-5	No	https://mje.sd23.bc.ca/
Mount Boucherie Senior Secondary School	West Kelowna	9-12	No	https://mbs.sd23.bc.ca/
North Glenmore Elementary School	Kelowna	K-6	No	https://nge.sd23.bc.ca/
Okanagan Mission Secondary School	Kelowna	7-12	Yes	https://okm.sd23.bc.ca/
Oyama Traditional School	Lake Country (Oyama)	K-5	No	https://ots.sd23.bc.ca/
Peachland Elementary School	Peachland	K-5	No	https://ple.sd23.bc.ca/
Pearson Elementary School	Kelowna	K-5	No	https://pse.sd23.bc.ca/about-us
Peter Greer Elementary School	Lake Country (Winfield)	K-5	Yes	https://pge.sd23.bc.ca/
Quigley Elementary School	Kelowna	K-5	No	https://qge.sd23.bc.ca/
Raymer Elementary School	Kelowna	K-6	No	https://ray.sd23.bc.ca/
Rose Valley Elementary School	Kelowna	K-5	No	https://rve.sd23.bc.ca/
Rutland Elementary School	Kelowna	K-5	No	https://rle.sd23.bc.ca/
Rutland Middle School	Kelowna	6-8	No	https://rms.sd23.bc.ca/
Rutland Senior Secondary School	Kelowna	9-12	No	https://rss.sd23.bc.ca/
Shannon Lake Elementary School	West Kelowna	K-5	No	https://sle.sd23.bc.ca/
South Kelowna Elementary School	Kelowna	K-6	No	https://ske.sd23.bc.ca/
South Rutland Elementary School	Kelowna	K-5	No	https://sre.sd23.bc.ca/
Springvalley Elementary School	Kelowna	K-5	No	https://sve.sd23.bc.ca/
Springvalley Middle School	Kelowna	6-8	No	https://sms.sd23.bc.ca/
Watson Road Elementary School	Kelowna	K-6	No	https://wat.sd23.bc.ca/
Webber Road Elementary	West Kelowna	K-5	No	https://wre.sd23.bc.ca/

== Human Rights Complaint ==
Central Okanagan School District No 23 v Renaud, [1992] 2 S.C.R. 970 is a leading Supreme Court of Canada decision where the Court found that an employer was under a duty to accommodate the religious beliefs of employees to the point of undue hardship.

== See also ==
- Central Okanagan School District No. 23 v. Renaud
- List of school districts in British Columbia
