= Okanagan Mission Secondary School =

Okanagan Mission Secondary

Location
- 4544 Gordon Drive; Kelowna, British Columbia, V1W 1T4; Canada; 49.8185°N 119.4853°W

Information
- School type: Public, high school
- Motto: Excellence through effort
- Opened: 1978
- School board: School District 23 Central Okanagan
- School number: 2323059
- Principal: Mr. Vince Hunter
- Staff: 127 (February 26, 2017)
- Grades: 9-12
- Enrollment: 1468 (January 16th, 2019)
- Language: English
- Area: Lower Mission
- Colours: Navy and Gold
- Mascot: Husky
- Team name: Huskies
- Website: okm.sd23.bc.ca

Okanagan Mission Secondary is a public high school in Kelowna, British Columbia, part of School District 23 Central Okanagan. It is well known for its consistent academic performance and successful arts programs, including its Triple Threat (formerly FAME) program, which stages a full Broadway musical every year. Other notable programs include their successful concert band and two jazz bands, one light and one heavy. Every three years, the OKM Band takes grade 10 to 12 concert band students on an international trip to various countries around the world, where they perform at attractions and historical sites like the Roman Colosseum. The grade 9 band class goes to Whistler every year. Okanagan Mission Secondary (OKM) is also ranked as a(n) AAAA school for many of its sports leagues, including its Soccer, Swim, and Hockey Academies. It gained attention province-wide for its Social Media class and their video production of "OKM Gangnam Style" published on the first of November in 2012 on YouTube, which quickly attained over 50,000 views.

In the 2014–2015 school year, OKM took in seventh-grade students, due to the local elementary schools being overcrowded. When Canyon Falls Middle School opened in September 2019, the school became grade 8–12, and starting in September 2020 it is grade 9–12. They now have 2 Vice Principals to assist with the large number of students. Also in the 2014-2015 year, OKM changed the husky logo due to the old one being too similar to the University of Washington's logo, who are also the Huskies.

OKM was ranked by the Fraser Institute in 2015 as 23 out of 294 British Columbian Secondary Schools. Okanagan Mission Secondary is one of the highest-ranked schools in the SD23 district.

Since Fall of 2022, OKM has operated a French Immersion program available to its students.

Kelowna's OKM dropped from a 7.9 score to 7.5 or 45/252 for the year 2020 as ranked by the Fraser Institute
