= Rutland Senior Secondary School =

Rutland Senior Secondary

Location
- 705 Rutland Road North; Kelowna, British Columbia, V1X 3B6; Canada; 49.8970°N 119.3838°W

Information
- School type: Public, High school
- Founded: 1952
- School board: School District 23 Central Okanagan
- Superintendent: Jon Rever
- School number: 2323044
- Principal: Hugh Alexander
- Staff: 78
- Grades: 9-12
- Enrollment: 1878 (2025/2026)
- Language: English
- Colours: Blue and Gold
- Team name: Thunder
- Website: https://rss.sd23.bc.ca/
- Last updated: October 3, 2026

Rutland Senior Secondary School (RSS) is part of School District 23 Central Okanagan (SD#23) in Kelowna, British Columbia. It is located off Rutland Road, sharing a lot with Rutland Middle School (RMS). It is a comprehensive high school offering a wide array of academic programs including Advanced Placement (AP), British Columbia Institute of Technology (BCIT) dual credit courses, and the Secondary School Apprenticeship program.

== Additional facts ==
- Built in 1972 on the current site. Expansion in 2000 and 2004/5.
- Programs - academic, vocational, advanced placement, apprenticeship programs, OUC dual credit, & BCIT programs

== Academics & Provincial Ranking ==
Rutland Secondary scored a 6.1 ranking from the Fraser Institute in 2020. RSS was ranked 119/252 high schools in BC in 2020.
