= MV Aricia =

History

Canada
- Name: Aricia
- Owner: Len A. Hayman
- Route: Okanagan Lake
- Builder: J. Y. Campbell
- Launched: 1912
- Maiden voyage: 1912

General characteristics
- Type: Ferry
- Tonnage: 12.6
- Length: 50 feet (15 m)
- Beam: 10 feet (3.0 m)

MV Aricia was a ferry that operated on Okanagan Lake in British Columbia, Canada. She was built in 1912 by J. Y. Campbell and was also known as the Kelowna-Westbank ferry (not to be confused with the 1927 ferry by the same name), because she served the communities of Kelowna and Westbank, British Columbia.

== Description ==
Aricia was the fifth ferry on the lake and had a passenger cabin, engine room, pilothouse, and life boat, and a stable was built on the west side of the lake for the public to use while waiting, including a feed locker for horses. All in all, she was the best-equipped ferry by far. In 1921, a scow with a capacity of eight cars was built and Aricia towed it across the lake.

== Career ==
In 1916, Captain Len A. Hayman bought her and piloted her for many years, operating on alternate years between Kelowna and Westbank.

A colorful event in Aricia's career occurred on a dark night in 1924. A headwind started up when Hayman was leaving Kelowna with six cars and nineteen passengers. A strong gale hit without warning near Westbank and Aricia hit the rocks. The gas line broke and passengers panicked before the life boat was lowered. The passengers and cars landed safely on the wharf only one hour and thirty minutes later than scheduled. The next day, Aricia was bailed out and sent to the shipyard at Okanagan Landing for repairs.

== See also ==
- SS Clovelly (ferry)
- MV Grace Darling (1919)
- MV Grace Darling (1923)
