= Undue hardship =

An undue hardship is an American and Canadian legal term referring to special or specified circumstances that partially or fully exempt a person or organization from performance of a legal obligation so as to avoid an unreasonable or disproportionate burden or obstacle.

For example, employers are required to provide a reasonable accommodation to qualified individuals with disabilities, but when an accommodation becomes too taxing on the organization it is classified as an undue hardship and is no longer required. These hardships include the nature and cost of the accommodation in relation to the size, resources, nature, and structure of the employer's operation. In the religious exemption context, undue burden is separately defined as anything "more than de minimus", as opposed to onerous or costly burdens.

== See also ==
- Central Alberta Dairy Pool v. Alberta (Human Rights Commission)
- Central Okanagan School District No. 23 v. Renaud
- British Columbia (PSERC) v. BCGSEU
- Carnival Cruise Lines, Inc. v. Shute
- Groff v. Dejoy
- British Columbia (Superintendent of Motor Vehicles) v. British Columbia (Council of Human Rights)
- Work-product doctrine
- Constructive trust
- Employment discrimination law in the United States
- Section 508 Amendment to the Rehabilitation Act of 1973
- Forum non conveniens
- Chapter 7, Title 11, United States Code
- Hardship clause
