= Mount Boucherie =

Mountain in British Columbia, Canada

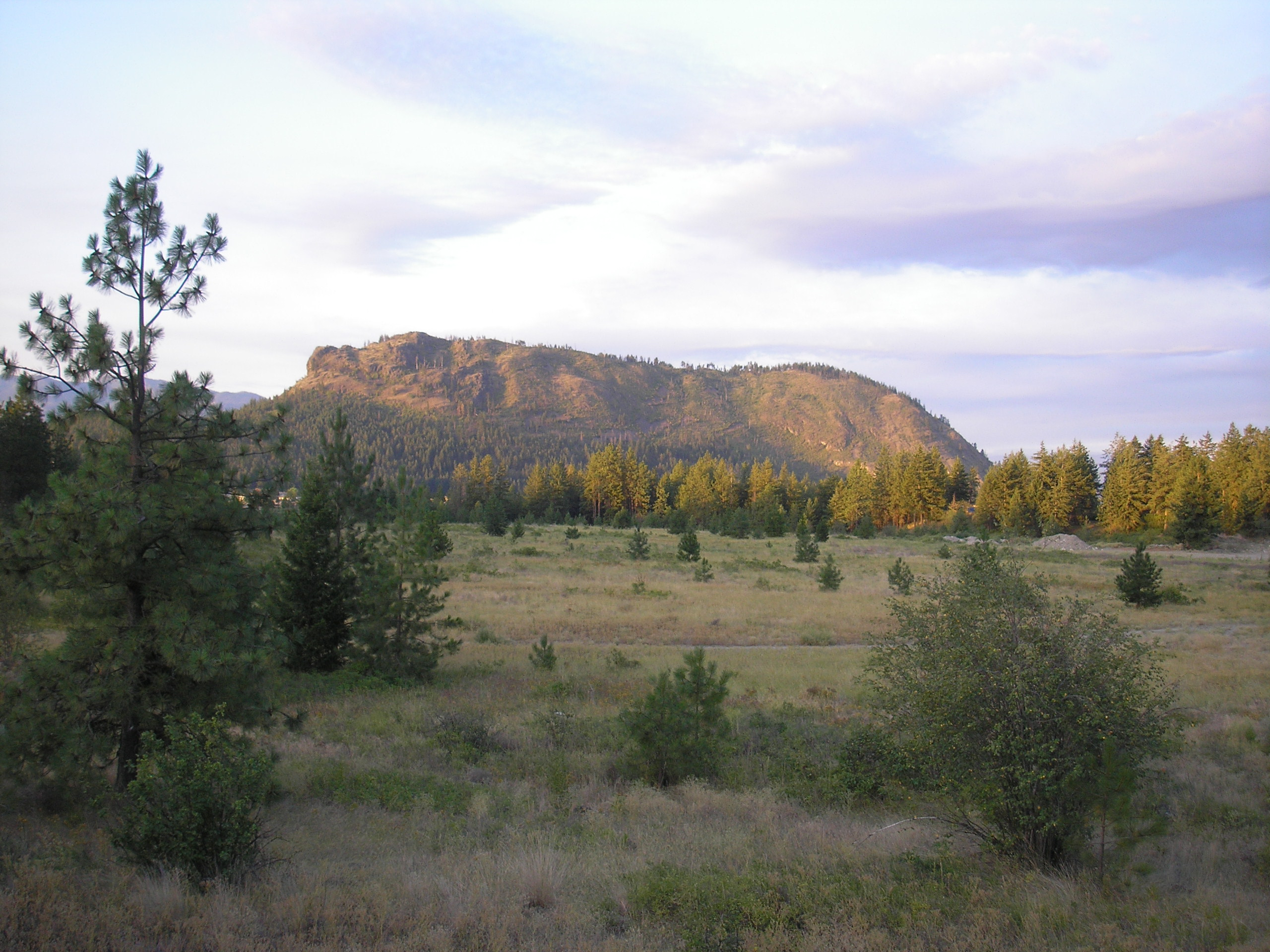
- North face of Mount Boucherie.

Highest point
- Elevation: 758 m (2,487 ft)
- Prominence: 283 m (928 ft)
- Listing: Mountains of British Columbia
- Coordinates: 49°51′14″N 119°34′53″W

Geography
- Location within British Columbia
- Interactive map of Mount Boucherie
- Location: West Kelowna, BC, Canada
- District: Osoyoos Division Yale Land District
- Parent range: Thompson Plateau
- Topo map: NTS 82E13 Peachland

Geology
- Rock age: Paleocene
- Mountain type: Stratovolcano
- Last eruption: Paleocene

Mount Boucherie is a mountain located in West Kelowna on the west shore of Okanagan Lake, British Columbia, Canada, opposite the city of Kelowna. It is the remnants of a former stratovolcano created nearly 60 million years ago. Between four and six different glacial periods over the past 50 million years have eroded the volcano to produce Mount Boucherie. Though it now only rises 417 metres above the nearby lake level, it is estimated to once have had an elevation of 2,000 m (6,562 ft) or more.

== Origin of the name ==
Mount Boucherie is named after Isadore Boucherie, a farmer, stock-raiser, and an early settler to both Rutland and the west side of the lake. In the late 1880s, Isadore purchased the land which is still known today as Boucherie Ranch, and the mountain behind the ranch still carries his name.

Other names for the mountain are also documented in various historical documents:

- Mount Edgar, named after Edgar Dewdney, a former Lieutenant-Governor of British Columbia. It is uncertain how common this name may have been, or when it ceased to be used.
- Mount Bouchier, or Bouchier Mountain, named after Isadore Bouchier
- Mount Boucherie, named after E. Boucherie, not Isadore Boucherie.

== Geology ==
Mount Boucherie is composed primarily of rhyolite and andesite, which gives the mountain its yellow, tan and pinkish colours on the north and south flanks. The more prominent black and dark gray east and north-east face is dacite. The columns, or pipes, were formed in the later stages of Mount Boucherie's volcanic period, as evidenced by the fact that the dacite columns intersect older rhyolite and andesite volcanic rock. Above the valley floor, the east cliff face is composed of folded volcanic flows of dacite.

The early Cenozoic was a tectonically active time in southern British Columbia, and the landscape of the time probably reflected the volcanism and faulting that was occurring.

== Park access ==
=== Mount Boucherie Regional Park ===
Mount Boucherie Regional Park covers 36.4 hectares (90 acres), but is generally accessible only through Eain Lamont Community Park.

=== Eain Lamont Community Park ===
Eain Lamont Community Park is 2.54 hectares (6.28 acres) in size, located on Lakeview Cove Place at 49°51′10″N 119°34′04″W. This park serves as the starting location for the various summit trails and perimeter trails around the base of Mount Boucherie.

== Forest fire of 1992 ==
In the early evening of May 7, 1992, a forest fire was accidentally started by two 11-year-old boys playing with matches behind Mount Boucherie Secondary School. This led to the evacuation of about 100 people while the blaze consumed 60 hectares of forest on the steep north and east slopes of Mount Boucherie. No houses were destroyed, and the fire eventually cost $170,000 to extinguish.

== Gallery ==
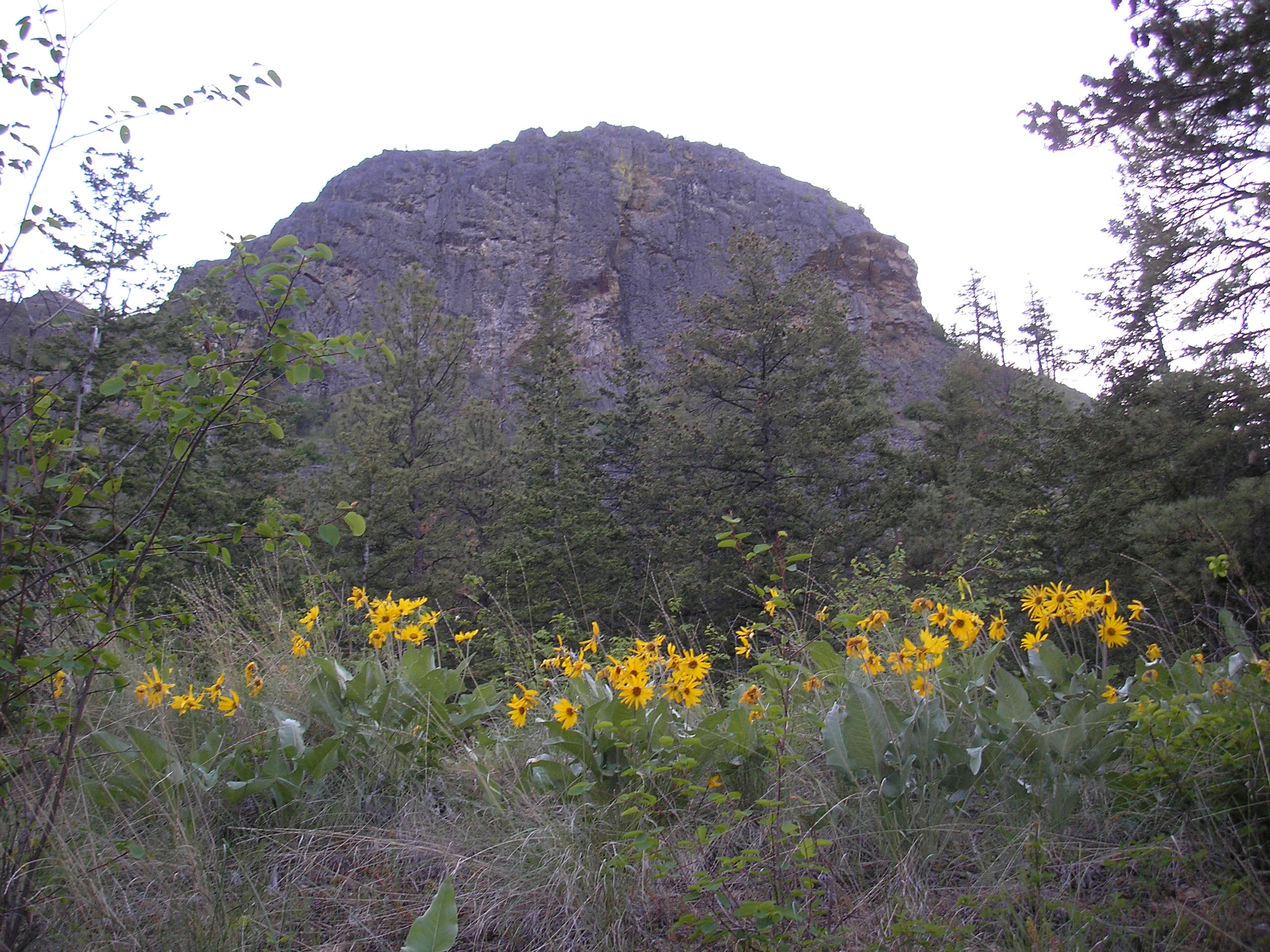
Looking up at the east face of Mount Boucherie.

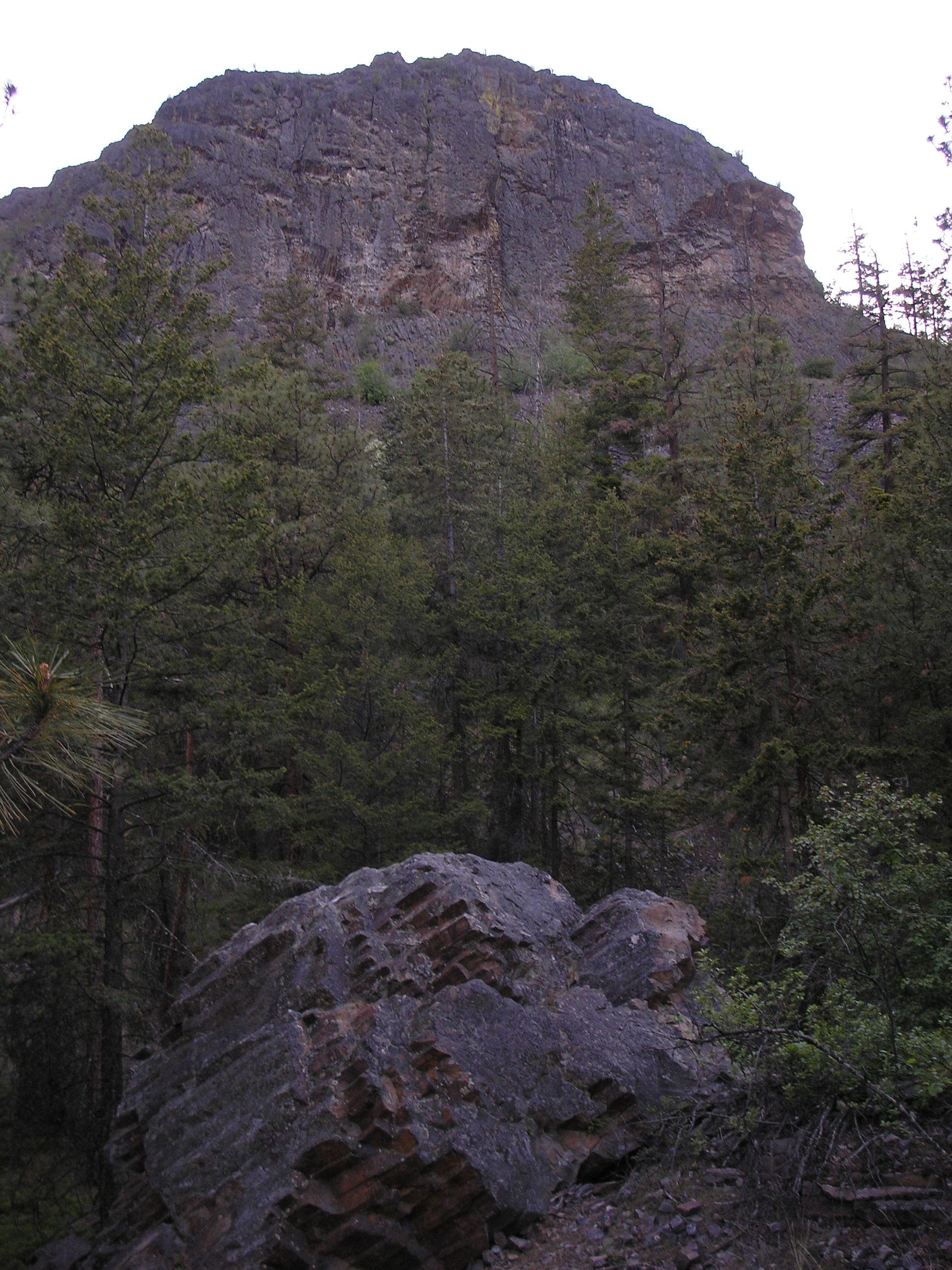
Another view of the east face, with a broken column of crystalline dacite in the foreground.

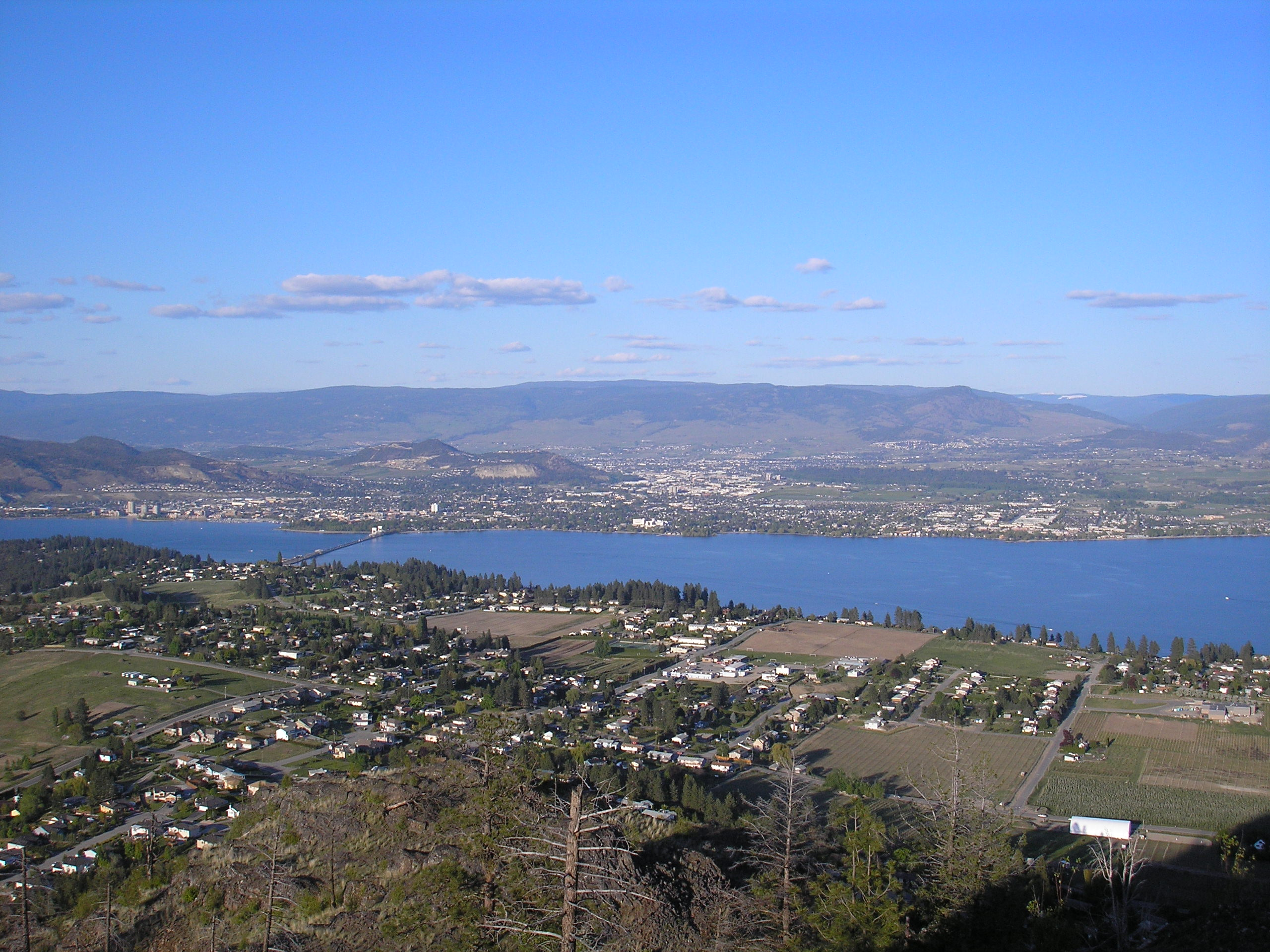
From the top east ridge, looking over Okanagan Lake towards Kelowna.

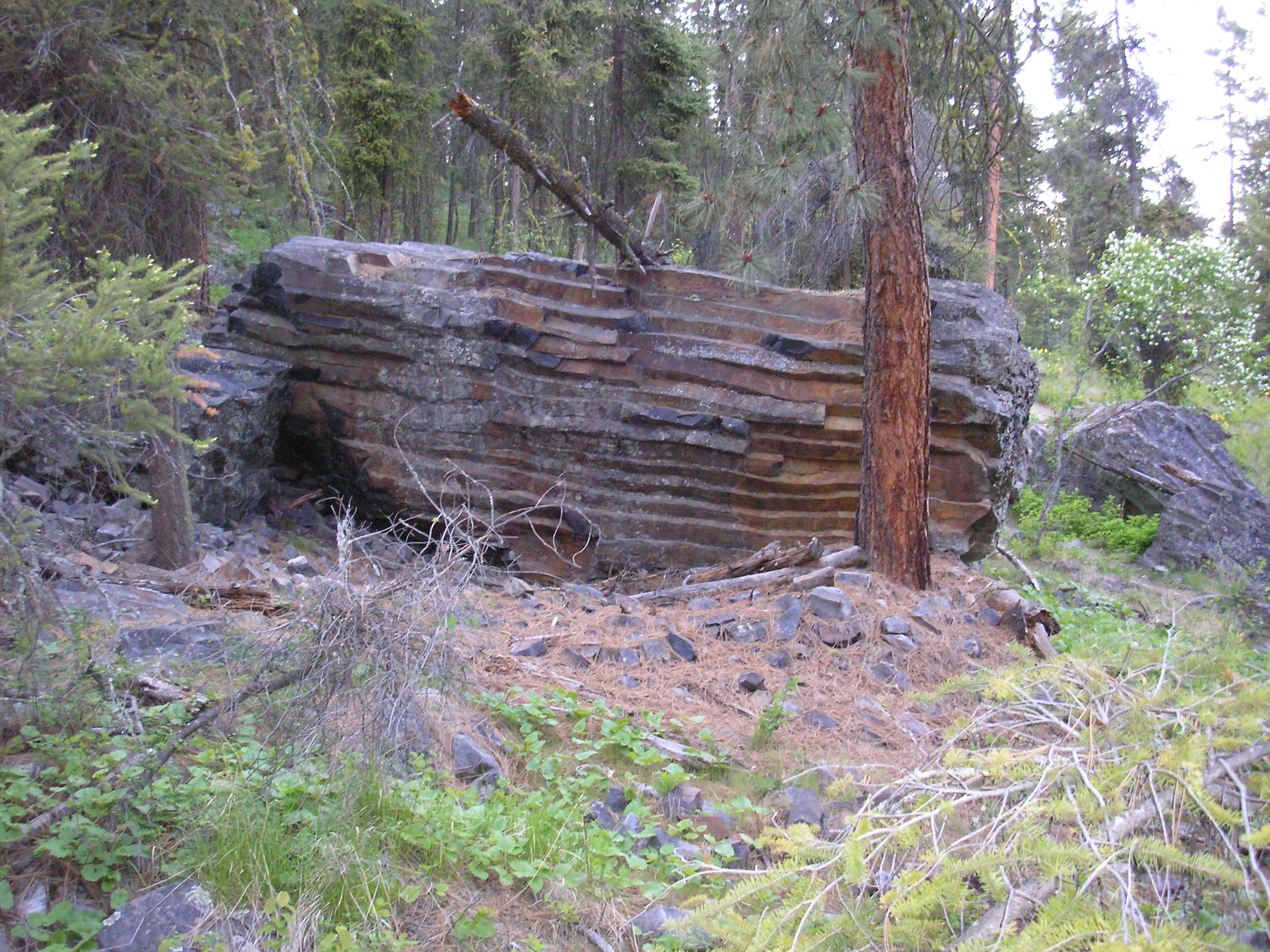
Large broken columns of crystalline dacite at the east base of Mount Boucherie.

== See also ==
- List of volcanoes in Canada
- Volcanism of Canada
- Volcanism of Western Canada
