= MV Grace Darling (1919) =

History

Canada
- Acquired: 1919

MV Grace Darling was a ferry that operated on Okanagan Lake in British Columbia, Canada. She was an early internal combustion-driven boat run by the Canadian Pacific Railway company in 1919 and was used to move building stone from the granite quarry on the lake shore south of Vernon, British Columbia. Grace Darling was Vernon Granite's first power boat and was purchased from Mrs. Oswald Pease from Ewing's Landing in 1919. She was one of the first internal combustion engine-powered boats on the lake and greatly facilitated the transport of stone barges from the quarry. Grace Darling was replaced by SS Tum Tum and a second MV Grace Darling after retirement.

== See also ==
- SS Clovelly
- MV Aricia
