= MV Grace Darling (1923) =

History

Canada

General characteristics
- Length: 20 ft (6.1 m)
- Installed power: Single-cylinder Easthope engine

MV Grace Darling was a boat that operated on Okanagan Lake in British Columbia, Canada. She was the last boat used for the granite quarry in Vernon, British Columbia, after an earlier boat also named MV Grace Darling, as well as SS Tum Tum. Grace Darling was a custom-built Turner boat ordered from Vancouver, British Columbia in 1923. She was 20 feet (6.1 m) in length and was small, but durable, outlasting the quarry operation by four years. She was powered by a single-cylinder Easthope engine built for towing. The Canadian Pacific Railway company delivered her to Okanagan Landing by flat car and she was named after the earlier Grace Darling, which had then been retired. The new Grace Darling became known as a first-rate rough-water vessel and lasted for over 40 years, until she broke up on the rocks at Inkster's Bay during a storm in the late 1960s.

== See also ==
- SS Clovelly
- MV Aricia
