= Central Okanagan School District No 23 v Renaud =

- Supreme Court of Canada

Hearing: March 24, 1992 Judgment: September 24, 1992
- Citations: [1992] 2 SCR 970
- Docket No.: 21682

Court membership
- Chief Justice: Antonio Lamer; Puisne Justices: Gérard La Forest, Claire L'Heureux-Dubé, John Sopinka, Charles Gonthier, Peter Cory, Beverley McLachlin, Frank Iacobucci, John C. Major

Reasons given
- Unanimous reasons by: Sopinka J

Central Okanagan School District No 23 v Renaud, [1992] 2 SCR 970 is a leading Supreme Court of Canada decision where the Court found that an employer was under a duty to accommodate the religious beliefs of employees to the point of undue hardship.

== Background ==
Larry Renaud was a unionized custodian in the Central Okanagan School District and a practicing Seventh-day Adventist. Under a collective agreement, Renaud was required to work on Friday evening. However, Renaud's faith forbade him from working sundown on Friday to sundown on Saturday. He proposed several forms of accommodations in which he would work Sunday to Thursday as a religious exception to the collective agreement. The school board rejected the alternatives and eventually terminated his employment.

Renaud brought a complaint on the grounds the school board violated section 8 of the British Columbia Human Rights Act for discrimination based on religion. The issues put to the Supreme Court was whether Renaud had been indirectly discriminated against and whether the school was under any duty to accommodate him.

== Decision ==
Justice Sopkina, writing for a unanimous Court, held that there had been discrimination against Renaud. Sopinka found that an employer was under a duty to accommodate employees religious beliefs short of undue hardship, even despite any collective agreement or private contract.

== See also ==
- Ontario (Human Rights Commission) v Simpsons-Sears Ltd
- Seventh-day Adventist Church
