= Ontario (Human Rights Commission) v Simpsons-Sears Ltd =

- Supreme Court of Canada

Hearing: January 29, 1985 Judgment: December 17, 1985
- Full case name: Ontario Human Rights Commission and Theresa O'Malley (Vincent) v Simpsons‑Sears Limited
- Citations: [1985] 2 SCR 536
- Docket No.: 17328
- Ruling: OHRC appeal allowed

Court membership
- Chief Justice: Brian Dickson; Puisne Justices: Jean Beetz, Willard Estey, William McIntyre, Julien Chouinard, Antonio Lamer, Bertha Wilson, Gerald Le Dain, Gérard La Forest

Reasons given
- Unanimous reasons by: McIntyre J

Ontario (Human Rights Commission) v Simpsons-Sears Ltd, [1985] 2 SCR 536 is a leading decision by the Supreme Court of Canada, which first acknowledged the existence of indirect discrimination through conduct that creates prejudicial effect.

== Background ==
Theresa O'Malley was a Seventh-day Adventist who was employed by the retailer Simpsons-Sears. As part of her religion, she was forbidden from working from sundown on Friday to sundown on Saturday. There were no full-time shifts available that did not require work on Friday and Saturday and so the company terminated her employment.

Simpsons-Sears argued that by requiring all its employees to work Fridays and Saturdays, it was not intentionally trying to discriminate against her, but it was a neutral requirement it imposed on all employees.

The issue before the Supreme Court was whether the requirement for all employees to work on Friday and Saturday was discriminatory against her religion.

== Decision ==
McIntyre J, writing for a unanimous Court, held Simpons-Sears had discriminated against O'Malley. Despite the reasonable basis for the requirement, the company had not tried to make any changes to the work schedule to accommodate O'Malley's religious requirements.

== See also ==
- Central Okanagan School District No 23 v Renaud
