= Okanagan Lake Bridge =

Historical pontoon bridge across Okanagan Lake in British Columbia, Canada

Kelowna Floating Bridge
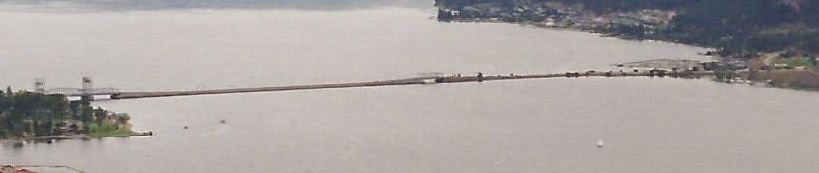
- Okanagan Lake Bridge viewed from Knox Mountain, Kelowna
- Coordinates: 49.879648°N 119.511852°W
- Carries: 3 reversible traffic lanes of Highway 97, pedestrians
- Crosses: Okanagan Lake
- Locale: Kelowna, BC
- Official name: Okanagan Lake Bridge
- Maintained by: SNC Lavalin

Characteristics
- Design: Pontoon bridge, Vertical lift bridge
- Total length: 650 m (2,133 feet)

History
- Opened: 19 July 1958
- Closed: 31 May 2008

Location
- Interactive map of Kelowna Floating Bridge

The Okanagan Lake Bridge (also known as the Kelowna Floating Bridge) was a three-lane, 650-metre (2,133-foot) long floating bridge in British Columbia, Canada. It crossed Okanagan Lake, connecting the Westside area to Kelowna on the lake's eastern side. Taller boats such as sailboats were able to pass under the lift span which was located at the east end of the bridge.

== History ==
Completed in 1958 and officially opened by Princess Margaret, the bridge was the first of its kind in Canada. The bridge was partially funded through tolls, which were collected from its opening until 1 April 1963. Originally the bridge only had 2 lanes, (1 in each direction), but in 1984 the bridge deck was reconfigured and a third lane was added. This new lane became a counter-flow lane, and would allow the lanes to adjust to traffic demand at different times of the day. In 1991 the bridge underwent major electrical repairs and a breakwater was removed.

The bridge served as an important regional transportation link in the Okanagan Valley, joining the southward section of Highway 97 on the west side of the lake to the northward section on the east side, and connecting West Kelowna and other southern points to Lake Country and other northern points.

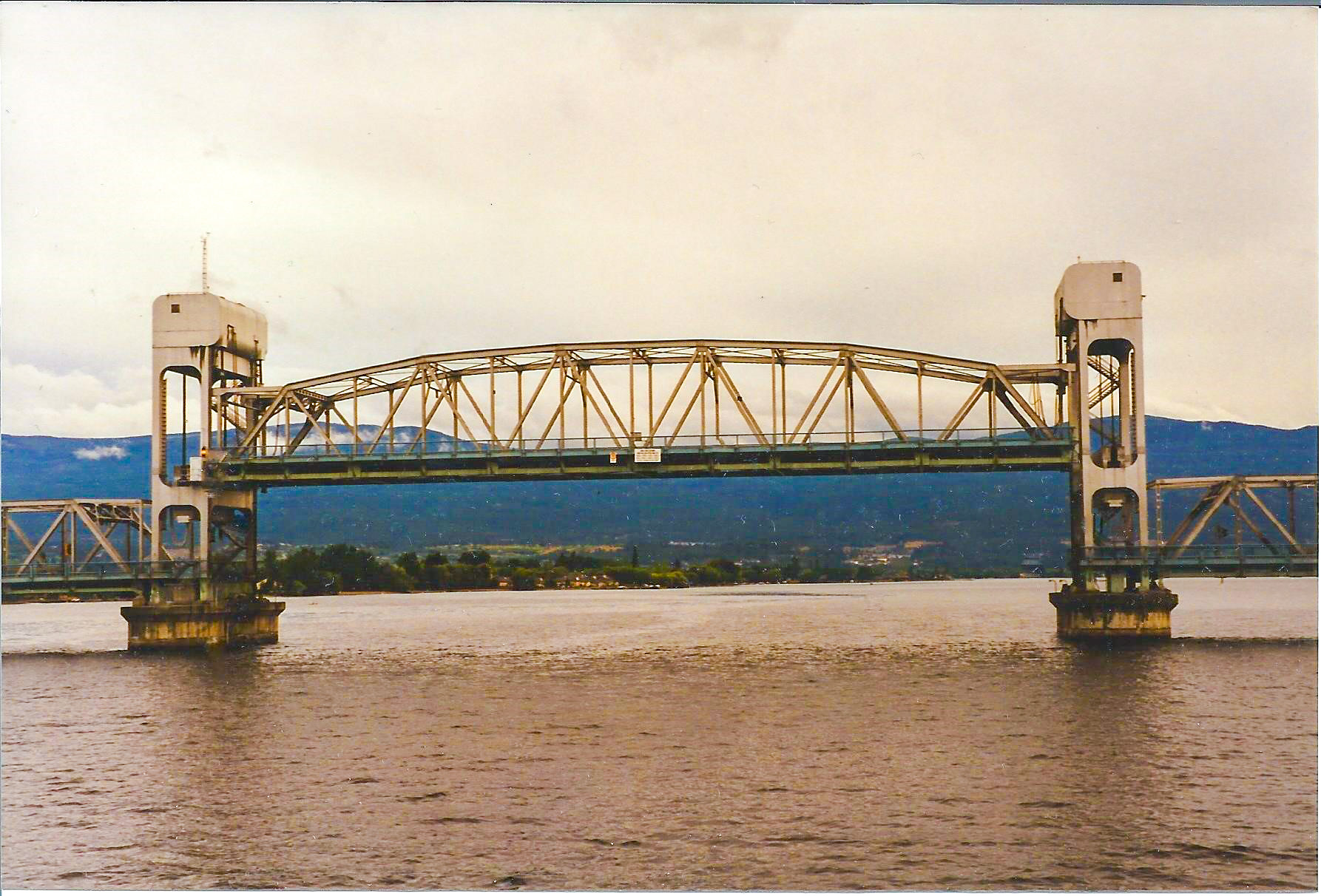
Okanagan Lake Bridge with the lift span raised

== Replacement ==
The floating bridge was replaced as it outlived its usefulness and was incapable of supporting the traffic levels. The construction of the new replacement bridge—the William R. Bennett Bridge—began in 2005 and was completed in 2008. The new bridge opened on 25 May 2008, and the old bridge closed 31 May 2008. It was decommissioned in 2009.

A concrete anchor from the original bridge was raised to surface and set at the corner of Highway 97 and Ellis Street in Downtown Kelowna. On 16 September 2024, the concrete anchor was demolished on site due to the City of Kelowna wanting to revitalize the area to create a more pleasing entry point.
