= SS Clovelly (ferry) =

History

Canada
- Namesake: Clovelly
- Builder: DeFoe
- Completed: 1907

General characteristics
- Type: Ferry

SS Clovelly was a steam ferry that operated on Okanagan Lake in British Columbia, Canada. She was commissioned by Captain L. A. Hayman and built by DeFoe in Vancouver, British Columbia in the fall of 1907. She was named after Clovelly, a small village on the Bristol Channel in England. She was launched by Captain J. B. Weeks and began a service of two trips a week hauling lumber, feed, and fruit between the communities of Westbank, Bear Creek, and Kelowna. She was the fourth ferry on the lake. Shortly after her launch, it was discovered that her vertical boiler leaked, so a water tube boiler was built by A. Brunette of the Leckie Hardware Company of Kelowna. She was inspected and passed by J. H. Thompson, Dominion Government Steamboat Inspector for the Province. In 1911, Clovelly was sold to E. Hankinson. Complaints about poor service reached the government and Hankinson lost the charter. Clovelly went to J. Y. Campbell, who operated her from 1912 to 1916 and also built MV Aricia in 1912.
