= West Kelowna =

- City
- City of West Kelowna
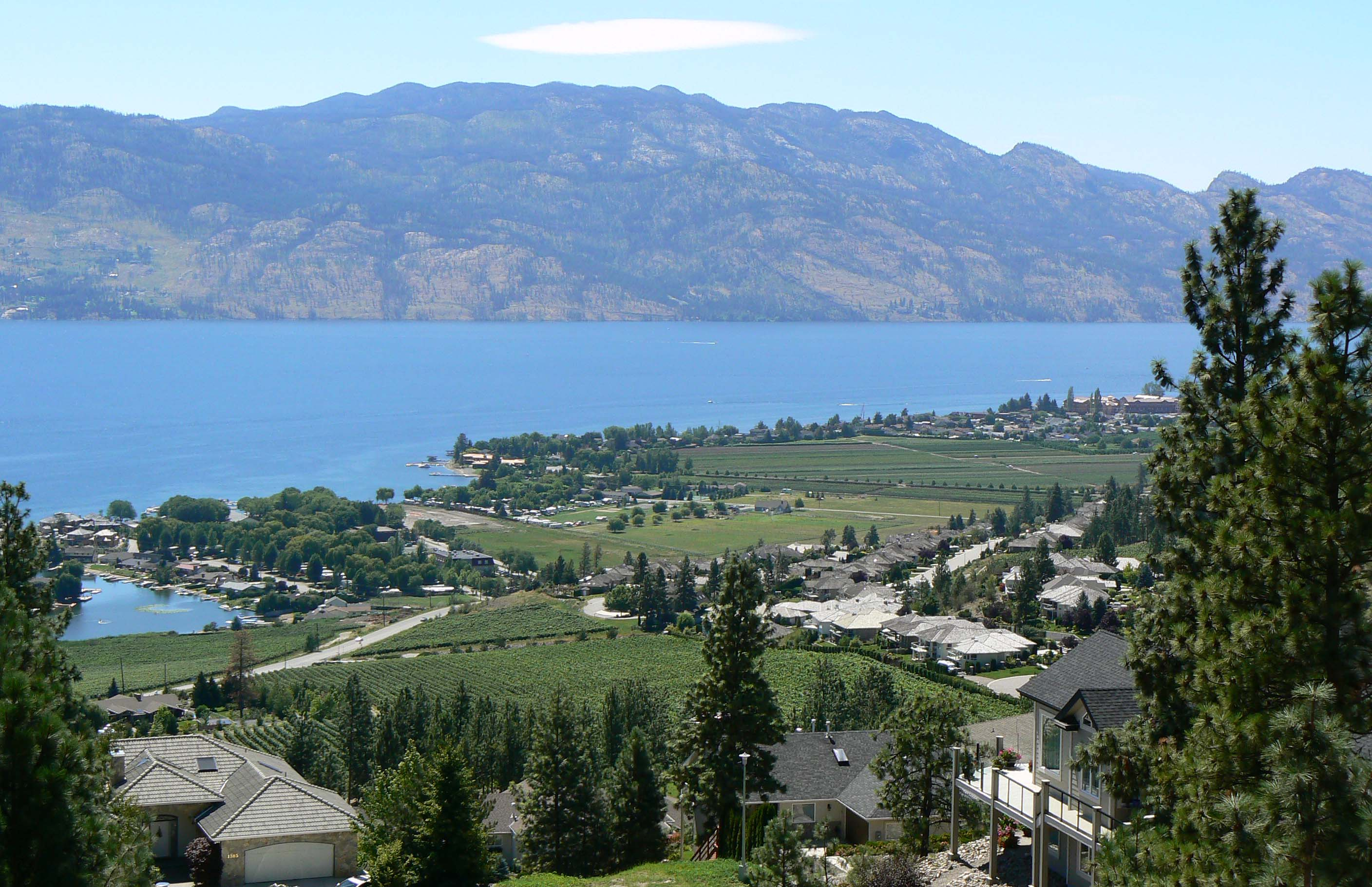
- West Kelowna as seen from Mount Boucherie

- Location of West Kelowna in British Columbia
- Coordinates: 49°51′45″N 119°35′00″W
- Country: Canada
- Province: British Columbia
- Regional district: Central Okanagan
- Incorporated (district municipality): December 6, 2007
- Name change: January 30, 2009
- Incorporated (city): June 26, 2015

Government
  - Mayor: Gord Milsom
  - Mayor-elect: Stephen Johnston

Area
  - Total: 123.53 km^{2} (47.70 sq mi)
  - Land: 122.09 km^{2} (47.14 sq mi)
- Elevation: 484 m (1,588 ft)

Population (2021)
  - Total: 36,078
  - Density: 296/km^{2} (770/sq mi)
- Time zone: UTC−07:00 (PT)
- Forward sortation area: V1Z, V4T
- Area codes: 250, 778, 236, 672
- Highways: 97, 97C
- Waterways: Okanagan Lake
- Website: westkelownacity.ca

West Kelowna, formerly known as Westside and colloquially known as Westbank, is a city in British Columbia's Okanagan Valley on the west shore of Okanagan Lake. The city encompasses several neighbourhoods, including Casa Loma, Gellatly, Glenrosa, Lakeview Heights, Shannon Lake, Smith Creek, Rose Valley, Westbank, and West Kelowna Estates. As of 2021, West Kelowna had an estimated population of 36,078.

West Kelowna incorporated in 2007 as Westside District Municipality, reflecting the name of the former Central Okanagan Regional District rural electoral area. On January 30, 2009, the municipality was officially renamed West Kelowna. The municipality was re-classified as the City of West Kelowna on June 26, 2015.

== History ==
A post office was opened in Westbank in 1902 and was named for its location on Okanagan Lake. The name was suggested by John Davidson who arrived in the district in 1892.

Westside District Municipality was established December 6, 2007. Prior to that date, the Westside had been governed as a rural area under the Central Okanagan Regional District since the 1970s. A June 2007 referendum offered residents the choice to change the governance structure, and a subsequent choice between incorporating as a municipality or amalgamating with the neighbouring City of Kelowna. On June 16, residents voted to change the Westside's governance structure, and also to incorporate by a slim margin of 5,924 to 5,582; voter turnout was approximately 48%. The vote was split along geographical lines, with voters from Westbank, Glenrosa, and other areas farther from the City of Kelowna voting to incorporate in larger numbers, and voters living closer to Kelowna typically supporting amalgamation. The 2007 referendum followed two previous referendums — one in 1980 and another in 1994 — in which residents voted against incorporation. Local Native Canadians were not allowed to vote on the name change as local, non-native, politicians used the argument that because the Native Canadians in the area did not pay local taxes, they did not have a right to vote on the name change. As a result, when you now drive on Hwy 97 through the community and cross into native reserve land you still to this day see signs that say 'Welcome to Westbank'. The community of Westbank is considered part of the community of West Kelowna.

In the fall of 2007, Rosalind Neis was elected as the first mayor of the newly incorporated area for a special one year term after running a campaign based on reversing the referendum result in order to pursue amalgamation with Kelowna. Despite winning the election, Neis did not ultimately pursue amalgamation. Neis did not run for mayor in the 2008 municipal election, which saw Doug Findlater elected mayor; Findlater would go on to serve three terms in the role. As part of the 2008 election, Westside residents also voted on changing the municipality's name. Options included Okanagan Hills, Westbank, Westlake, and West Kelowna. West Kelowna won over Westbank by a margin of 3,841 to 3,675. The West Kelowna name was confirmed by the municipal council on December 9, 2008 and became official January 30, 2009, after the Government of British Columbia approved the change to the Letters Patent.

In 2015, West Kelowna officially became classified as a city.

In 2018, Gord Milsom became the third person to serve as municipality's mayor; Milsom was re-elected in 2022.

In August 2023, high winds caused a wildfire in McDougall Creek to rapidly expand and threaten the city. Many properties burned down, including a historic resort on Okanagan Lake, leading to extensive evacuations. Ultimately, over fifty homes were destroyed by the fire and several thousand people were ordered to evacuate until the fire was classified as held in late September.

On September 21, 2026, following the publication of the official list of candidates for the 2026 municipal election, as only one nomination was received for the office of Mayor, Stephen Johnston was declared elected by acclamation by the Chief Election Officer, to be effective as of November 3, 2026, when the rest of council take office.

== Geography ==
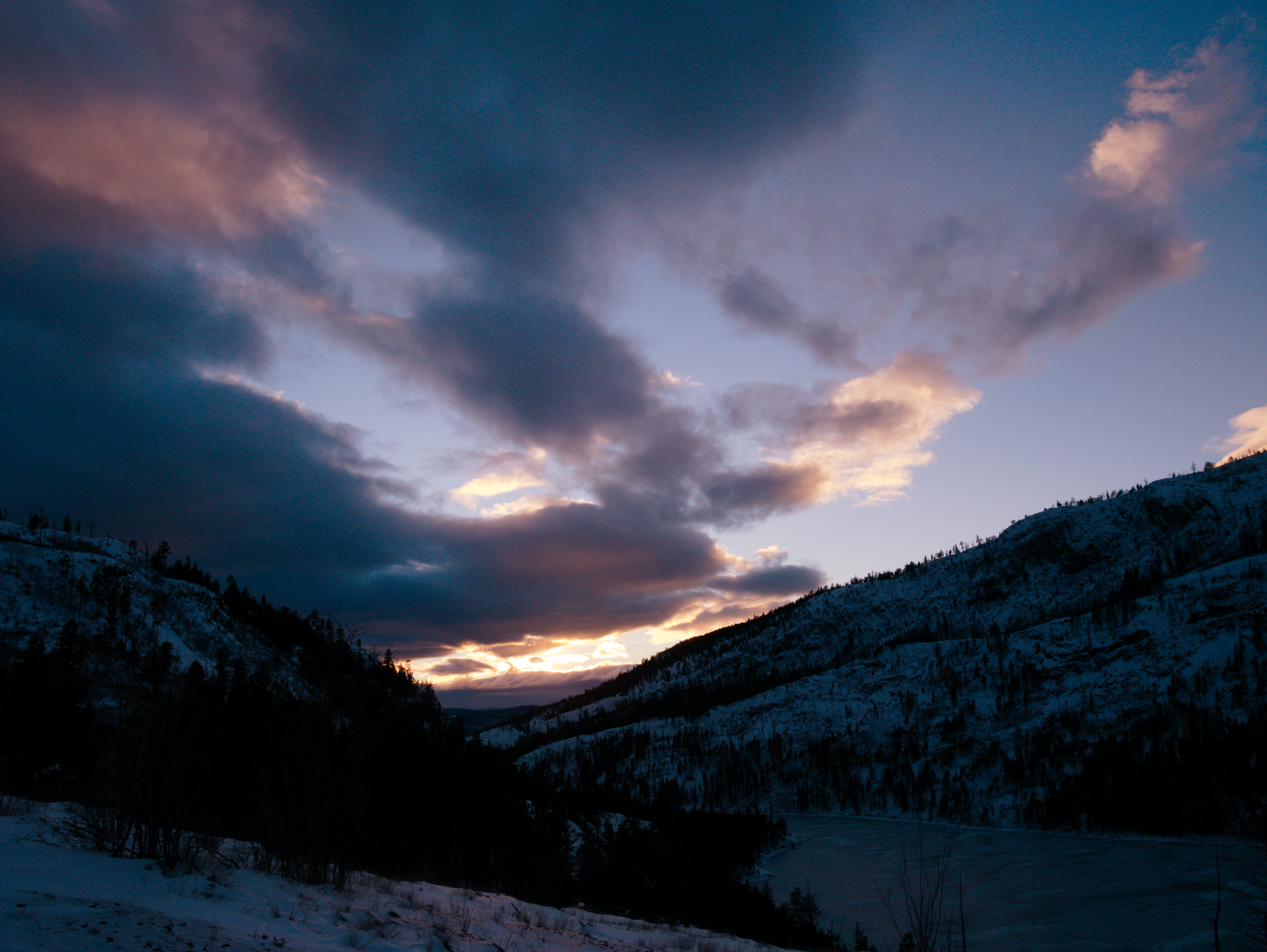
Winter sunset over Rose Valley

The City of West Kelowna is located on the central western shores and hillsides of Okanagan Lake. It is the primary gateway to the Central Okanagan from the west via Highway 97C, the Okanagan Connector.

Neighbourhoods within the city's jurisdiction include Goats Peak/Gellatly, Glenrosa, Shannon Lake, Smith Creek, Westbank Centre, and Westbank in the south, which comprise approximately half of the total population, and Westside Road/Bear Creek Road, West Kelowna Estates/Rose Valley, Bartley North, West Kelowna Business Park, Boucherie Centre, South Boucherie, Lakeview Heights, and Casa Loma in the north. Many of these neighbourhoods, including Glenrosa, Gellatly, Lakeview Heights, Sunnyside, and Westbank, have rich histories, some dating to the early to mid-19th century.

Bordering the City of West Kelowna are the District of Peachland, Central Okanagan West Electoral Area, and two self-governing reserves of the Westbank First Nation (WFN), Tsinstikeptum 9 and Tsinstikeptum 10. As of 2008, 6,215 people lived on the reserves, including 510 people registered under the Indian Act.

== Demographics ==
Federal census population history
Year	Pop.	±%
2006	27,214	—
2011	30,892	+13.5%
2016	32,655	+5.7%
2021	36,078	+10.5%
Source: Statistics Canada

In the 2021 Census of Population conducted by Statistics Canada, West Kelowna had a population of 36,078 living in 13,974 of its 14,746 total private dwellings, a change of 10.5% from its 2016 population of 32,655. With a land area of 122.09 km^{2} (47.14 sq mi), it had a population density of 295.5/km^{2} (765.4/sq mi) in 2021.

=== Ethnicity ===
Panethnic groups in the City of West Kelowna (2001−2021)
Panethnic group	2021		2016		2011		2006		2001	
Panethnic group	Pop.	%	Pop.	%	Pop.	%	Pop.	%	Pop.	%
European (Note: Statistic includes all persons that did not make up part of a visible minority or an indigenous identity.)	30,960	86.6%	28,405	88.56%	28,045	91.8%	26,665	92.43%	14,850	93.75%
Indigenous	2,170	6.07%	1,835	5.72%	1,455	4.76%	1,095	3.8%	445	2.81%
East Asian (Note: Statistic includes total responses of "Chinese", "Korean", and "Japanese" under visible minority section on census.)	665	1.86%	610	1.9%	255	0.83%	420	1.46%	270	1.7%
South Asian	590	1.65%	345	1.08%	315	1.03%	280	0.97%	110	0.69%
Southeast Asian (Note: Statistic includes total responses of "Filipino" and "Southeast Asian" under visible minority section on census.)	520	1.45%	405	1.26%	185	0.61%	95	0.33%	90	0.57%
African	320	0.9%	130	0.41%	45	0.15%	95	0.33%	35	0.22%
Latin American	265	0.74%	185	0.58%	130	0.43%	55	0.19%	15	0.09%
Middle Eastern (Note: Statistic includes total responses of "West Asian" and "Arab" under visible minority section on census.)	125	0.35%	80	0.25%	20	0.07%	25	0.09%	10	0.06%
Other/multiracial (Note: Statistic includes total responses of "Visible minority, n.i.e." and "Multiple visible minorities" under visible minority section on census.)	145	0.41%	70	0.22%	105	0.34%	115	0.4%	20	0.13%
Total responses	35,750	99.09%	32,075	98.22%	30,550	98.89%	28,850	99.58%	15,840	99.4%
Total population	36,078	100%	32,655	100%	30,892	100%	28,972	100%	15,935	100%
Note: Totals greater than 100% due to multiple origin responses.

=== Religion ===
According to the 2021 census, religious groups in West Kelowna included:

- Irreligion (19,990 persons or 55.9%)
- Christianity (14,850 persons or 41.5%)
- Sikhism (235 persons or 0.7%)
- Hinduism (105 persons or 0.3%)
- Judaism (105 persons or 0.3%)
- Buddhism (125 persons or 0.3%)
- Islam (100 persons or 0.3%)
- Other (230 persons or 0.6%)

== Economy ==
West Kelowna has a diverse economy, which includes agriculture, construction, finance, food and retail services, light industry, lumber manufacturing, technology, tourism, and wineries. More than 2,200 business licences are issued annually.

The Greater Westside economic region has a population of more than 52,000 people, with 34,883 living in the City of West Kelowna, an estimated 10,000 residing in Westbank First Nation (based on projections since the 2016 national census), over 5,671 in Peachland (BC Stats, 2018) and approximately 2,000 in the surrounding rural areas.

The Greater Westside is part of the larger Central Okanagan Regional District and economic region with a population of 208,852 (BC Stats, 2018) residents.

Traditional shopping areas in West Kelowna are Boucherie Centre, Lakeview Heights Shopping Centre, Westbank Centre and the West Kelowna Business Park, which offer a variety of retail outlets, cafes and restaurants, and tourist accommodations and attractions. The City of West Kelowna has a scenic wine trail with a dozen wineries lining the route. A farm loop features varied local agricultural products, seasonal farmers' markets, and the Gellatly Bay multi-use corridor, which includes the CNR Wharf Aquatic Park.

Major private employers include Gorman Bros. Lumber and Mission Hill Family Estate Winery. Major public employers include Interior Health and Central Okanagan Public Schools (School District 23).

West Kelowna's business areas are also complemented by those in the Westbank First Nation, which include various big box stores, cafes and restaurants, retail outlets, services, theatres, and tourist accommodations and attractions.

== Education ==
West Kelowna is located within School District 23 Central Okanagan. Mount Boucherie Senior Secondary School serves grades 9 through 12, and is the only high school in the municipality. West Kelowna has two middle schools, serving grades 6 through 8: Constable Neil Bruce Middle School and Glenrosa Middle School. Nine public elementary schools are located in the municipality: Chief Tomat, George Pringle (includes French immersion programming), Glenrosa Elementary School, Helen Gorman, Hudson Road, Mar Jok, Rose Valley, and Shannon Lake. Private elementary schools are Our Lady of Lourdes Catholic School and Sensisyusten House of Learning, which is located in the neighbouring Westbank First Nation Tsinstikeptum 9 community. Post-secondary educational opportunities are available in the nearby City of Kelowna, including two major public institutions: UBC Okanagan and Okanagan College.

Self-Government municipal regulatory powers have been given by treaty to the Westbank First Nation (WFN). Westbank First Nation spans 5,340 acres of Reservation land, separated into five land parcels.

== Recreation and culture ==
Several community and regional parks are scattered throughout the municipality, offering soccer pitches, ball fields, children's play areas, and hiking trails. Recreational destinations include the Constable Neil Bruce Soccer Fields, the Mount Boucherie Ball Diamonds and Pickleball Courts, Lakeview Heights Tennis Courts, and Rosewood Sports Field. A community garden, pergola, two off-leash dog parks, and a popular children's water park are located in the Westbank Town Centre Park. West Kelowna has a lakefront walking trail alongside Gellatly Road and several swimming areas along Okanagan Lake, including Willow Beach. Popular trails are located in Eain Lamont and Mount Boucherie Parks and in Glen Canyon, Goats Peak, Kalamoir, and Rose Valley Regional Parks. Telemark is a popular winter recreational area offering snowshoeing and cross country skiing opportunities.

The Mount Boucherie Community Centre includes Royal LePage Place arena—home to the West Kelowna Warriors of the BCHL—and Jim Lind Arena for ice sports such as hockey, figure skating, and ringette. Johnson Bentley Memorial Aquatic Centre, in downtown Westbank, offers indoor public swimming and recreational programs. Memorial Park features a skateboard park. The municipality funds youth and seniors' centres in downtown Westbank.

Free Friday night concerts are held in July and August at Annette Beaudreau Amphitheatre in Memorial Park in Westbank Centre at the south end of Old Okanagan Highway. The amphitheatre and park are also home to a large number of events and concerts during the annual Westside Daze celebration, which includes a parade and midway.

Shannon Lake Golf Course is the only 18-hole golf course in the City of West Kelowna. Two Eagles Golf Course in the neighbouring Westbank First Nation also offers 18-holes, a putting course, and a driving range.

The Westbank Museum offers pioneer exhibits, artifacts, and archives. Smaller galleries sell works by local artists and potters. Westbank First Nation operates an Indigenous museum.
