= Greater Kelowna =

- Census metropolitan area
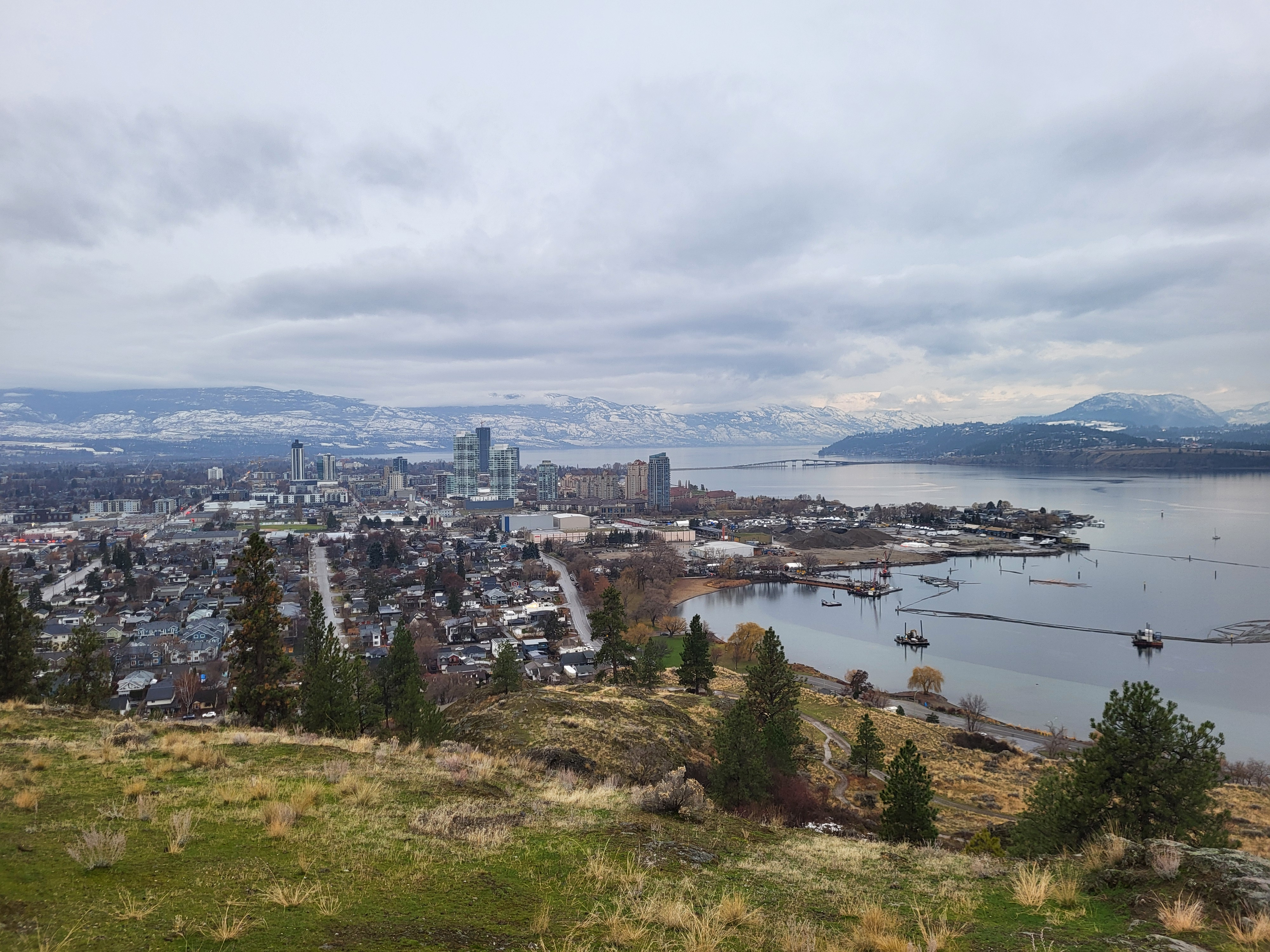
- Skyline of Kelowna
- Country: Canada
- Province: British Columbia

Area
  - Total: 2,902.45 km^{2} (1,120.64 sq mi)

Population
  - CMA: 222,162
- Time zone: UTC−07:00 (PT)

Greater Kelowna is a census metropolitan area (CMA) in the southern interior portion of the Canadian province of British Columbia that is centred on the City of Kelowna. At a population of 249,217 in the 2021 Census of Population as conducted by Statistics Canada, the CMA consists of nine census subdivisions including two cities, two district municipalities, two regional district electoral areas, and three Indian reserves. It is the fastest growing CMA within British Columbia and the fifth fastest growing in all of Canada.

The term "Greater Kelowna" is roughly coterminous with the geographic area governed by the Central Okanagan Regional District.

== Geography ==
Located in the Okanagan region within the south-central portion of the British Columbia Interior, the Kelowna CMA is bisected by Highway 97. Census subdivisions within the CMA include the cities of Kelowna and West Kelowna, the districts of Lake Country and Peachland, the regional district electoral areas of Central Okanagan and Central Okanagan West, and the Duck Lake 7, Tsinstikeptum 9, and Tsinstikeptum 10 Indian reserves. Waterways within the Kelowna CMA include Kalamalka Lake and Okanagan Lake.

== Demographics ==
In the 2021 Census of Population conducted by Statistics Canada, the Kelowna CMA had a population of 222,162 living in 94,335 of its 102,097 total private dwellings, a change of 14% from its 2016 population of 194,892. With a land area of 2,902.45 km^{2} (1,120.64 sq mi), it had a population density of 76.5/km^{2} (198.2/sq mi) in 2021.

Census subdivisions in the Kelowna CMA
Name	Status	2021 Census of Population						
Name	Status	Population (2021)	Population (2016)	Change	Land area		Population density	
Name	Status	Population (2021)	Population (2016)	Change	km^{2}	sq mi	/km^{2}	/sq mi
Kelowna	City	144,576	127,390	+13.5%	211.85	81.80	682.4	1,767
West Kelowna	City	36,078	32,655	+10.5%	122.09	47.14	295.5	765
Lake Country	District municipality	15,817	12,922	+22.4%	122.16	47.17	129.5	335
Peachland	District municipality	5,789	5,428	+6.7%	16.10	6.22	359.6	931
Central Okanagan East	Regional district electoral area	4,258	3,814	+11.6%	1,245.08	480.73	3.4	8.8
Central Okanagan West	Regional district electoral area	2,897	1,991	+45.5%	1,173.10	452.94	2.5	6.5
Duck Lake 7	Indian reserve	1,847	1,664	+11.0%	2.01	0.78	918.9	2,380
Tsinstikeptum 9	Indian reserve	9,134	7,612	+20.0%	6.76	2.61	1,351.2	3,500
Tsinstikeptum 10	Indian reserve	1,766	1,416	+24.7%	3.31	1.28	533.5	1,382
Total Kelowna CMA		222,162	194,892	+14.0%	2,902.45	1,120.64	76.5	198

== See also ==
- Greater Vernon
