= Greater Vernon =

- Census agglomeration
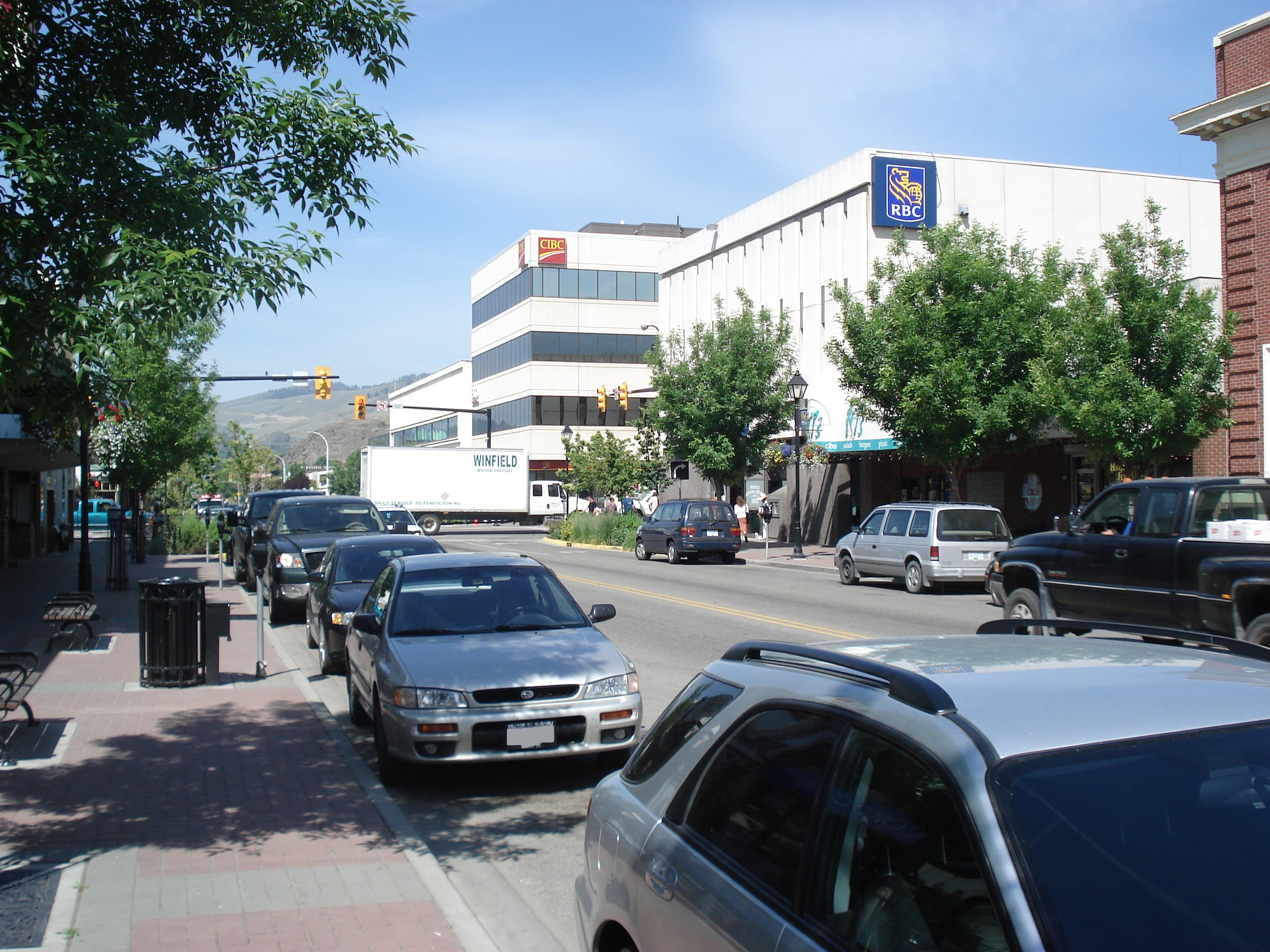
- Downtown Vernon
- Interactive map of Greater Vernon
- Coordinates: 50°16′00″N 119°16′18″W
- Country: Canada
- Province: British Columbia
- Largest city: Vernon
- District municipality: Coldstream

Area
  - Total: 1,041.09 km^{2} (401.97 sq mi)
- Elevation: 380 m (1,250 ft)

Population (2021)
  - Density: 64.4/km^{2} (167/sq mi)
  - CA: 67,086
  - Rank: 54
- Time zone: UTC−07:00 (PT)
- Postal codes: V1B, V1H, V1T
- Area codes: 250, 778
- Highways: 6, 97, 97A
- Waterways: Kalamalka Lake; Okanagan Lake; Swan Lake

Greater Vernon is a census agglomeration (CA) in the southern interior portion of the Canadian province of British Columbia that is centred on the City of Vernon. At a population of 67,086 in the 2021 Census of Population as conducted by Statistics Canada, the agglomeration consists of six census subdivisions including one city (Vernon), one district municipality (Coldstream), two regional district electoral areas, and two Indian reserves.

== Geography ==
Located in the Okanagan region within the south-central portion of the British Columbia Interior, the Vernon CA is bisected by Highway 97. Census subdivisions within the CA include the City of Vernon, the District Coldstream, the regional district electoral areas of North Okanagan B and North Okanagan C, the Priest's Valley 6 Indian reserve, and a portion of the Okanagan 1 Indian reserve. Waterways within the Vernon CA include Kalamalka Lake, Okanagan Lake, and Swan Lake.

== Demographics ==
In the 2021 Census of Population conducted by Statistics Canada, the Vernon CA had a population of 67,086 living in 28,723 of its 31,677 total private dwellings, a change of 9.4% from its 2016 population of 61,324. With a land area of 1,041.09 km^{2} (401.97 sq mi), it had a population density of 64.4/km^{2} (166.9/sq mi) in 2021.

Census subdivisions in the Vernon CA
Name	Status	2021 Census of Population						
Name	Status	Population (2021)	Population (2016)	Change	Land area		Population density	
Name	Status	Population (2021)	Population (2016)	Change	km^{2}	sq mi	/km^{2}	/sq mi
Vernon	City	44,519	40,116	+11.0%	96.43	37.23	461.7	1,196
Coldstream	District municipality	11,171	10,648	+4.9%	66.57	25.70	167.8	435
North Okanagan B	Regional district electoral area	3,274	3,203	+2.2%	487.80	188.34	6.7	17
North Okanagan C	Regional district electoral area	4,511	3,870	+16.6%	300.14	115.88	15.0	39
Okanagan 1	Indian reserve	3,244	2,859	+13.5%	89.79	34.67	36.1	93
Priest's Valley 6	Indian reserve	367	628	−41.6%	0.36	0.14	1,019.4	2,640
Total Vernon CA		67,086	61,324	+9.4%	1,041.09	401.97	64.4	167

== Education ==
The Greater Vernon area is served by School District 22 Vernon, which provides school services for children in the area.

== See also ==
- Greater Kelowna
