= List of regional district electoral areas in British Columbia =

The Canadian province of British Columbia is divided into regional districts and municipalities. Outside of municipalities within their surrounding regional districts are unincorporated areas known as regional district electoral areas (RDEAs). British Columbia has 27 regional districts as well as an unincorporated region (Stikine Region), which together are home to 158 RDEAs.

== List ==
List of regional district electoral areas in British Columbia
Name	Regional district	2021 Census of Population				
Name	Regional district	Population (2021)	Population (2016)	Change	Land area (km^{2})	Population density
Alberni-Clayoquot A	Alberni-Clayoquot	256	243	+5.3%	1,619.77	0.2/km^{2}
Alberni-Clayoquot B	Alberni-Clayoquot	531	443	+19.9%	92.22	5.8/km^{2}
Alberni-Clayoquot C	Alberni-Clayoquot	875	677	+29.2%	3,199.27	0.3/km^{2}
Alberni-Clayoquot D	Alberni-Clayoquot	1,843	1,616	+14.0%	1,398.89	1.3/km^{2}
Alberni-Clayoquot E	Alberni-Clayoquot	2,946	2,754	+7.0%	21.91	134.5/km^{2}
Alberni-Clayoquot F	Alberni-Clayoquot	1,977	1,935	+2.2%	186.53	10.6/km^{2}
Bulkley-Nechako A	Bulkley-Nechako	5,587	5,256	+6.3%	3,674.43	1.5/km^{2}
Bulkley-Nechako B	Bulkley-Nechako	1,706	1,885	−9.5%	3,624.72	0.5/km^{2}
Bulkley-Nechako C	Bulkley-Nechako	1,266	1,420	−10.8%	25,527.99	0.0/km^{2}
Bulkley-Nechako D	Bulkley-Nechako	1,607	1,472	+9.2%	4,389.75	0.4/km^{2}
Bulkley-Nechako E	Bulkley-Nechako	1,512	1,593	−5.1%	15,856.11	0.1/km^{2}
Bulkley-Nechako F	Bulkley-Nechako	3,517	3,665	−4.0%	5,386.26	0.7/km^{2}
Bulkley-Nechako G	Bulkley-Nechako	836	903	−7.4%	14,417.38	0.1/km^{2}
Cariboo A	Cariboo	6,169	6,234	−1.0%	778.12	7.9/km^{2}
Cariboo B	Cariboo	3,864	3,842	+0.6%	1,413.47	2.7/km^{2}
Cariboo C	Cariboo	1,239	1,225	+1.1%	7,377.49	0.2/km^{2}
Cariboo D	Cariboo	2,870	2,929	−2.0%	849.54	3.4/km^{2}
Cariboo E	Cariboo	4,112	4,064	+1.2%	1,745.18	2.4/km^{2}
Cariboo F	Cariboo	4,792	4,554	+5.2%	9,740.2	0.5/km^{2}
Cariboo G	Cariboo	5,312	5,156	+3.0%	2,646.03	2.0/km^{2}
Cariboo H	Cariboo	1,884	1,784	+5.6%	2,593.68	0.7/km^{2}
Cariboo I	Cariboo	1,485	1,435	+3.5%	11,915.99	0.1/km^{2}
Cariboo J	Cariboo	616	642	−4.0%	25,880.08	0.0/km^{2}
Cariboo K	Cariboo	447	398	+12.3%	13,629.59	0.0/km^{2}
Cariboo L	Cariboo	4,769	4,204	+13.4%	1,263.69	3.8/km^{2}
Central Coast A	Central Coast	149	203	−26.6%	19,779.25	0.0/km^{2}
Central Coast C	Central Coast	661	653	+1.2%	3,963.65	0.2/km^{2}
Central Coast D	Central Coast	403	399	+1.0%	304.21	1.3/km^{2}
Central Coast E	Central Coast	162	148	+9.5%	359.53	0.5/km^{2}
Central Kootenay A	Central Kootenay	2,241	1,930	+16.1%	1,689.12	1.3/km^{2}
Central Kootenay B	Central Kootenay	4,802	4,657	+3.1%	1,615.1	3.0/km^{2}
Central Kootenay C	Central Kootenay	1,475	1,472	+0.2%	740.25	2.0/km^{2}
Central Kootenay D	Central Kootenay	1,462	1,343	+8.9%	5,781.11	0.3/km^{2}
Central Kootenay E	Central Kootenay	3,897	3,772	+3.3%	807.99	4.8/km^{2}
Central Kootenay F	Central Kootenay	4,116	3,963	+3.9%	404.38	10.2/km^{2}
Central Kootenay G	Central Kootenay	1,650	1,623	+1.7%	1,509.14	1.1/km^{2}
Central Kootenay H	Central Kootenay	5,045	4,655	+8.4%	3,288.2	1.5/km^{2}
Central Kootenay I	Central Kootenay	2,607	2,534	+2.9%	109.48	23.8/km^{2}
Central Kootenay J	Central Kootenay	3,517	3,137	+12.1%	1,693.07	2.1/km^{2}
Central Kootenay K	Central Kootenay	1,784	1,681	+6.1%	4,377.01	0.4/km^{2}
Central Okanagan East	Central Okanagan	4,258	3,814	+11.6%	1,245.08	3.4/km^{2}
Central Okanagan West	Central Okanagan	2,897	1,991	+45.5%	1,173.1	2.5/km^{2}
Columbia-Shuswap A	Columbia-Shuswap	3,325	3,148	+5.6%	13,434.86	0.2/km^{2}
Columbia-Shuswap B	Columbia-Shuswap	663	583	+13.7%	9,763.8	0.1/km^{2}
Columbia-Shuswap C	Columbia-Shuswap	8,919	7,921	+12.6%	506.1	17.6/km^{2}
Columbia-Shuswap D	Columbia-Shuswap	4,400	4,044	+8.8%	693.67	6.3/km^{2}
Columbia-Shuswap E	Columbia-Shuswap	1,388	1,185	+17.1%	1,530.03	0.9/km^{2}
Columbia-Shuswap F	Columbia-Shuswap	3,200	2,454	+30.4%	2,652.05	1.2/km^{2}
Comox Valley A	Comox Valley	7,926	7,213	+9.9%	491.34	16.1/km^{2}
Comox Valley B	Comox Valley	7,392	7,095	+4.2%	54.08	136.7/km^{2}
Comox Valley C	Comox Valley	9,158	8,577	+6.8%	1,071.86	8.5/km^{2}
Cowichan Valley A	Cowichan Valley	4,949	4,733	+4.6%	49.21	100.6/km^{2}
Cowichan Valley B	Cowichan Valley	8,994	8,558	+5.1%	306.08	29.4/km^{2}
Cowichan Valley C	Cowichan Valley	5,046	5,019	+0.5%	22.57	223.6/km^{2}
Cowichan Valley D	Cowichan Valley	3,530	3,243	+8.8%	15.53	227.3/km^{2}
Cowichan Valley E	Cowichan Valley	4,253	4,121	+3.2%	134.78	31.6/km^{2}
Cowichan Valley F	Cowichan Valley	1,804	1,629	+10.7%	1,791.88	1.0/km^{2}
Cowichan Valley G	Cowichan Valley	2,442	2,315	+5.5%	286.9	8.5/km^{2}
Cowichan Valley H	Cowichan Valley	2,603	2,446	+6.4%	83.02	31.4/km^{2}
Cowichan Valley I	Cowichan Valley	1,423	1,206	+18.0%	505.51	2.8/km^{2}
East Kootenay A	East Kootenay	1,875	1,683	+11.4%	4,598.88	0.4/km^{2}
East Kootenay B	East Kootenay	2,011	1,976	+1.8%	2,781.15	0.7/km^{2}
East Kootenay C	East Kootenay	6,536	6,021	+8.6%	4,528.65	1.4/km^{2}
East Kootenay E	East Kootenay	1,686	1,753	−3.8%	4,254.44	0.4/km^{2}
East Kootenay F	East Kootenay	3,521	2,726	+29.2%	6,091.91	0.6/km^{2}
East Kootenay G	East Kootenay	1,654	1,467	+12.7%	4,656.39	0.4/km^{2}
Fraser Valley A	Fraser Valley	495	405	+22.2%	2,325.06	0.2/km^{2}
Fraser Valley B	Fraser Valley	869	892	−2.6%	3,085.22	0.3/km^{2}
Fraser Valley C	Fraser Valley	1,133	1,023	+10.8%	3,662.73	0.3/km^{2}
Fraser Valley D	Fraser Valley	2,092	1,529	+36.8%	219.38	9.5/km^{2}
Fraser Valley E	Fraser Valley	1,568	1,540	+1.8%	640.29	2.4/km^{2}
Fraser Valley F	Fraser Valley	1,384	1,293	+7.0%	2,015.06	0.7/km^{2}
Fraser Valley G	Fraser Valley	1,692	1,776	−4.7%	96.81	17.5/km^{2}
Fraser Valley H	Fraser Valley	2,459	1,847	+33.1%	109.01	22.6/km^{2}
Fraser-Fort George A	Fraser-Fort George	3,471	3,463	+0.2%	1,371.79	2.5/km^{2}
Fraser-Fort George C	Fraser-Fort George	3,603	3,527	+2.2%	2,802.33	1.3/km^{2}
Fraser-Fort George D	Fraser-Fort George	4,375	4,278	+2.3%	667.61	6.6/km^{2}
Fraser-Fort George E	Fraser-Fort George	533	526	+1.3%	614.2	0.9/km^{2}
Fraser-Fort George F	Fraser-Fort George	1,249	1,246	+0.2%	12,487.29	0.1/km^{2}
Fraser-Fort George G	Fraser-Fort George	365	334	+9.3%	17,214.6	0.0/km^{2}
Fraser-Fort George H	Fraser-Fort George	1,589	1,586	+0.2%	14,926.73	0.1/km^{2}
Juan de Fuca	Capital	5,531	4,860	+13.8%	1,489.2	3.7/km^{2}
Kitimat-Stikine A	Kitimat-Stikine	48	20	+140.0%	25,253.67	0.0/km^{2}
Kitimat-Stikine B	Kitimat-Stikine	1,455	1,473	−1.2%	7,382.17	0.2/km^{2}
Kitimat-Stikine C	Kitimat-Stikine	2,978	2,839	+4.9%	27,622.43	0.1/km^{2}
Kitimat-Stikine D	Kitimat-Stikine	74	99	−25.3%	28,105.99	0.0/km^{2}
Kitimat-Stikine E	Kitimat-Stikine	3,932	3,993	−1.5%	16.49	238.4/km^{2}
Kitimat-Stikine F	Kitimat-Stikine	326	360	−9.4%	12,956.41	0.0/km^{2}
Kootenay Boundary A	Kootenay Boundary	1,624	1,891	−14.1%	238.18	6.8/km^{2}
Kootenay Boundary B	Kootenay Boundary	1,422	1,442	−1.4%	776.31	1.8/km^{2}
Kootenay Boundary C	Kootenay Boundary	1,627	1,337	+21.7%	529.57	3.1/km^{2}
Kootenay Boundary D	Kootenay Boundary	3,226	3,225	0.0%	2,117.85	1.5/km^{2}
Kootenay Boundary E	Kootenay Boundary	3,004	2,155	+39.4%	4,293.14	0.7/km^{2}
Metro Vancouver A	Metro Vancouver	18,612	16,133	+15.4%	815.21	22.8/km^{2}
Mount Waddington A	Mount Waddington	695	724	−4.0%	12,666.41	0.1/km^{2}
Mount Waddington B	Mount Waddington	35	60	−41.7%	2,579.6	0.0/km^{2}
Mount Waddington C	Mount Waddington	764	750	+1.9%	1,505.03	0.5/km^{2}
Mount Waddington D	Mount Waddington	371	394	−5.8%	3,331.05	0.1/km^{2}
Nanaimo A	Nanaimo	7,481	7,058	+6.0%	60.18	124.3/km^{2}
Nanaimo B	Nanaimo	4,500	4,033	+11.6%	58.02	77.6/km^{2}
Nanaimo C	Nanaimo	3,344	2,808	+19.1%	1,097.77	3.0/km^{2}
Nanaimo E	Nanaimo	6,765	6,125	+10.4%	74.83	90.4/km^{2}
Nanaimo F	Nanaimo	8,216	7,724	+6.4%	264.11	31.1/km^{2}
Nanaimo G	Nanaimo	8,109	7,526	+7.7%	49.31	164.4/km^{2}
Nanaimo H	Nanaimo	4,291	3,884	+10.5%	277.14	15.5/km^{2}
North Coast A	North Coast	45	41	+9.8%	2,928.16	0.0/km^{2}
North Coast C	North Coast	31	85	−63.5%	6,484.78	0.0/km^{2}
North Coast D	North Coast	580	468	+23.9%	6,418.04	0.1/km^{2}
North Coast E	North Coast	325	340	−4.4%	3,408.85	0.1/km^{2}
North Okanagan B	North Okanagan	3,274	3,203	+2.2%	487.8	6.7/km^{2}
North Okanagan C	North Okanagan	4,511	3,870	+16.6%	300.14	15.0/km^{2}
North Okanagan D	North Okanagan	2,909	2,672	+8.9%	1,790.98	1.6/km^{2}
North Okanagan E	North Okanagan	1,092	1,010	+8.1%	2,604.05	0.4/km^{2}
North Okanagan F	North Okanagan	4,362	4,000	+9.1%	1,767.29	2.5/km^{2}
Okanagan-Similkameen A	Okanagan-Similkameen	2,139	1,858	+15.1%	258.04	8.3/km^{2}
Okanagan-Similkameen B	Okanagan-Similkameen	1,151	1,047	+9.9%	238.78	4.8/km^{2}
Okanagan-Similkameen C	Okanagan-Similkameen	3,986	3,557	+12.1%	444.75	9.0/km^{2}
Okanagan-Similkameen D	Okanagan-Similkameen	4,016	3,757	+6.9%	583.93	6.9/km^{2}
Okanagan-Similkameen E	Okanagan-Similkameen	2,015	1,903	+5.9%	491.9	4.1/km^{2}
Okanagan-Similkameen F	Okanagan-Similkameen	2,092	2,014	+3.9%	568.86	3.7/km^{2}
Okanagan-Similkameen G	Okanagan-Similkameen	2,298	2,134	+7.7%	2,110.68	1.1/km^{2}
Okanagan-Similkameen H	Okanagan-Similkameen	2,232	1,933	+15.5%	4,757.22	0.5/km^{2}
Okanagan-Similkameen I	Okanagan-Similkameen	2,307	2,219	+4.0%	344.36	6.7/km^{2}
Peace River B	Peace River	5,379	5,628	−4.4%	85,959.79	0.1/km^{2}
Peace River C	Peace River	5,947	6,667	−10.8%	568.14	10.5/km^{2}
Peace River D	Peace River	4,793	5,920	−19.0%	11,688.01	0.4/km^{2}
Peace River E	Peace River	2,660	2,949	−9.8%	16,336.91	0.2/km^{2}
qathet A	qathet	1,250	1,105	+13.1%	3,886.89	0.3/km^{2}
qathet B	qathet	1,664	1,541	+8.0%	128.61	12.9/km^{2}
qathet C	qathet	2,197	2,064	+6.4%	642.05	3.4/km^{2}
qathet D	qathet	1,126	1,076	+4.6%	299.75	3.8/km^{2}
qathet E	qathet	498	399	+24.8%	73.32	6.8/km^{2}
Salt Spring Island	Capital	11,635	10,557	+10.2%	182.94	63.6/km^{2}
Southern Gulf Islands	Capital	6,101	4,732	+28.9%	191.08	31.9/km^{2}
Squamish-Lillooet A	Squamish-Lillooet	305	187	+63.1%	3,712.38	0.1/km^{2}
Squamish-Lillooet B	Squamish-Lillooet	373	383	−2.6%	3,463.88	0.1/km^{2}
Squamish-Lillooet C	Squamish-Lillooet	2,000	1,663	+20.3%	5,513.22	0.4/km^{2}
Squamish-Lillooet D	Squamish-Lillooet	1,057	1,057	0.0%	3,040.2	0.3/km^{2}
Stikine Region	Stikine	424	455	−6.8%	118,395.89	0.0/km^{2}
Strathcona A	Strathcona	864	764	+13.1%	7,111.01	0.1/km^{2}
Strathcona B	Strathcona	1,059	1,035	+2.3%	135.55	7.8/km^{2}
Strathcona C	Strathcona	2,737	2,431	+12.6%	9,229.03	0.3/km^{2}
Strathcona D	Strathcona	4,153	3,977	+4.4%	1,584.07	2.6/km^{2}
Sunshine Coast A	Sunshine Coast	3,039	2,619	+16.0%	1,898.02	1.6/km^{2}
Sunshine Coast B	Sunshine Coast	2,969	2,726	+8.9%	1,269.45	2.3/km^{2}
Sunshine Coast D	Sunshine Coast	3,523	3,421	+3.0%	143.36	24.6/km^{2}
Sunshine Coast E	Sunshine Coast	3,883	3,664	+6.0%	21.6	179.8/km^{2}
Sunshine Coast F	Sunshine Coast	2,407	2,043	+17.8%	380.75	6.3/km^{2}
Thompson-Nicola A	Thompson-Nicola	1,573	1,493	+5.4%	7,085.66	0.2/km^{2}
Thompson-Nicola B	Thompson-Nicola	230	233	−1.3%	5,126.2	0.0/km^{2}
Thompson-Nicola E	Thompson-Nicola	1,162	1,094	+6.2%	6,625.5	0.2/km^{2}
Thompson-Nicola I	Thompson-Nicola	1,038	1,262	−17.7%	5,736.53	0.2/km^{2}
Thompson-Nicola J	Thompson-Nicola	1,796	1,580	+13.7%	3,285.56	0.5/km^{2}
Thompson-Nicola L	Thompson-Nicola	3,321	2,945	+12.8%	1,912.94	1.7/km^{2}
Thompson-Nicola M	Thompson-Nicola	1,637	1,598	+2.4%	3,845.3	0.4/km^{2}
Thompson-Nicola N	Thompson-Nicola	717	762	−5.9%	2,341.58	0.3/km^{2}
Thompson-Nicola O	Thompson-Nicola	1,523	1,323	+15.1%	5,381.16	0.3/km^{2}
Thompson-Nicola P	Thompson-Nicola	4,098	3,672	+11.6%	1,546.56	2.6/km^{2}

== See also ==
- List of designated places in British Columbia
- List of Indian reserves in British Columbia
- List of municipalities in British Columbia

- List of cities in British Columbia
- List of district municipalities in British Columbia
- List of towns in British Columbia
- List of villages in British Columbia

- List of population centres in British Columbia
- List of regional districts in British Columbia
