= List of regional districts of British Columbia =

Regional Districts of British Columbia
- Location: British Columbia
- Number: 27
- Populations: 683 (Stikine Region) – 2,642,825 (Metro Vancouver)
- Areas: 1,697 km^{2} (655 sq mi) (Comox Valley) – 118,409 km^{2} (45,718 sq mi) (Stikine Region)
- Government: Municipal government
- Subdivisions: Municipalities (cities, district municipalities, Indian government districts, island municipalities, mountain resort municipalities, regional municipalities, resort municipalities, towns, and villages) and Indian reserves

The Canadian province of British Columbia is divided into regional districts as a means to better enable municipalities and rural areas to work together at a regional level. These divisions also serve as the province's census divisions.

There are 27 regional districts, one unincorporated area (Stikine), and one district municipality branded as a regional municipality (Northern Rockies).

== History ==
Regional districts came into being via an order of government in 1965 with the enactment of amendments to the Municipal Act. Until the creation of regional districts, the only local form of government in British Columbia was incorporated municipalities, and services in areas outside municipal boundaries had to be sought from the province or through improvement districts.

== Governance ==
Similar to counties in other parts of Canada, regional districts serve only to provide municipal services as the local government in areas not incorporated into a municipality and in certain regional affairs of shared concern between residents of unincorporated areas and those in the municipalities, such as a stakeholder role in regional planning. In those predominantly rural areas, regional districts provide services such as land use planning, building inspection, solid-waste management, and some responsibility for community fire protection.

Most land nominally within a regional district is under the control of the provincial government, or in the case of national parks and offshore waters, the federal government. Indian reserves located within the boundaries of regional districts are likewise excluded from their jurisdiction and infrastructure, and there are varying levels of collaboration between First Nations governments and regional district boards.

Regional districts are governed by boards of directly and indirectly elected directors. Municipalities appoint directors to represent their populations (usually the mayors), while residents of unincorporated areas (which are grouped into electoral areas) elect directors directly. The votes of directors from municipalities generally count more than those of directors from electoral areas, and larger municipalities have more votes than smaller ones. For example, both North Saanich and Metchosin appoint one director to the Capital Regional District board of directors, but the vote of North Saanich's director counts three times as much as the vote of Metchosin's appointee.

== List ==
British Columbia regional districts as of February 9, 2021
Regional district	Office location	Established	Population (2021)	Area (km^{2})	Density (per km^{2})
Alberni–Clayoquot	Port Alberni	April 21, 1966	33,521	6,577	5.1
Bulkley–Nechako	Burns Lake	February 1, 1966	37,737	73,203	0.52
Capital	Victoria	February 1, 1966	415,451	2,338	177.7
Cariboo	Williams Lake	July 9, 1968	62,931	80,374	0.78
Central Coast	Bella Coola	July 16, 1968	3,582	24,434	0.15
Central Kootenay	Nelson	November 30, 1965	62,509	22,078	2.8
Central Okanagan	Kelowna	August 24, 1967	222,162	2,902	76.5
Columbia–Shuswap	Salmon Arm	November 30, 1965	57,021	28,886	2.0
Comox Valley	Courtenay	February 1, 2008	72,445	1,697	42.7
Cowichan Valley	Duncan	September 26, 1967	89,013	3,472	25.6
East Kootenay	Cranbrook	November 30, 1965	65,896	27,514	2.4
Fraser Valley	Chilliwack	December 12, 1995	324,005	13,319	24.3
Fraser–Fort George	Prince George	March 8, 1967	96,979	50,581	1.9
Kitimat–Stikine	Terrace	September 14, 1967	37,790	104,307	0.36
Kootenay Boundary	Trail	February 22, 1966	33,152	8,081	4.1
Metro Vancouver	Burnaby	June 29, 1967	2,642,825	2,879	918.0
Mount Waddington	Port McNeill	June 13, 1966	10,839	20,186	0.54
Nanaimo	Nanaimo	August 24, 1967	170,367	2,036	83.7
North Coast	Prince Rupert	August 17, 1967	18,181	19,710	0.92
North Okanagan	Coldstream	November 9, 1965	91,610	7,497	12.2
Northern Rockies (Note: Although described as a regional municipality in its official name, and existing on the same administrative level as a regional district, Northern Rockies is actually classified as a district municipality.)	Fort Nelson	January 29, 2009	4,478	84,859	0.05
Okanagan–Similkameen	Penticton	March 4, 1966	90,178	10,407	8.7
Peace River	Dawson Creek	October 31, 1967	61,532	117,217	0.52
qathet	Powell River	December 19, 1967	21,496	5,068	4.2
Squamish–Lillooet	Pemberton	October 3, 1969	50,496	16,296	3.1
Stikine Region (Note: The Stikine Region is not officially per se a regional district but is rather an unincorporated area; it is administered directly by the provincial government.)	(N/A)	(N/A)	683	118,409	0.01
Strathcona	Campbell River	February 1, 2008	48,150	18,244	2.6
Sunshine Coast	Sechelt	January 4, 1967	32,170	3,767	8.5
Thompson–Nicola	Kamloops	November 24, 1967	143,680	44,347	3.2

== Historical regional districts ==
The first regional district was established in 1965, and the then-final regional district was established in 1968.

The following regional districts were dissolved in December 1995 and amalgamated largely into the newly formed Fraser Valley Regional District:

- Dewdney–Alouette Regional District: consisting of Mission, Pitt Meadows, and Maple Ridge, and unincorporated areas north of the Fraser River and west of the District of Kent
- Central Fraser Valley Regional District: consisting of the modern City of Abbotsford (itself newly formed at the time) and adjacent unincorporated areas – Sumas Mountain (now FVRD Electoral H), west of Chilliwack and south of the Fraser River.
- Regional District of Fraser–Cheam: consisting of the eastern two-thirds of the modern Fraser Valley Regional District, including Chilliwack, Kent, Harrison Hot Springs, Hope, and the Fraser Canyon unincorporated areas.

The western half of Dewdney–Alouette, consisting of Maple Ridge and Pitt Meadows, was incorporated into the Greater Vancouver Regional District (now Metro Vancouver). Mission and the unincorporated areas east of the Chehalis River were incorporated into the Fraser Valley Regional District.

This amalgamation occurred due to the western part of Dewdney–Alouette becoming essentially a suburb of Vancouver and the thought that it would be better served within Metro Vancouver. The Central Fraser Valley RD would be nearly completely dominated by the newly amalgamated City of Abbotsford, bringing the regional district's role into question; similarly, the remnant of Dewdney-Alouette would be dominated by Mission. Given the rapid growth experienced in the Fraser Valley at the time, which was expected to continue for the foreseeable future, creating the Fraser Valley Regional District was seen as the best option.

The Comox–Strathcona Regional District was abolished in February 2008 and replaced by two successor regional districts: Comox Valley and Strathcona.

The Peace River–Liard Regional District was created on October 31, 1967, when the regional district system was first established. On October 31, 1987, it was split into the Peace River Regional District and the Fort Nelson–Liard Regional District, which since has become the Northern Rockies Regional Municipality.

== See also ==
- List of regional district electoral areas in British Columbia
- Administrative divisions of Canada
- List of communities in British Columbia
