= Westbank First Nation =

First Nations band in British Columbia, Canada

- Band No. 601
- Symbol

- Westbank Statement of Intent boundaries
- People: syilx
- Treaty: Westbank First Nation Self-Government Agreement
- Headquarters: Westbank
- Province: British Columbia

Land
- Other reserves: Mission Creek 8; Tsinstikeptum 9; Tsinstikeptum 10; Medicine Hill 11; Medicine Creek 12
- Land area: 21.613 km^{2} (8.345 sq mi)

Population (2019)
- On reserve: 433
- Off reserve: 481
- Total population: 914

Government
- Chief: Robert Louie

Tribal Council
- Okanagan Nation Alliance

Website
- wfn.ca

The Westbank First Nation (Okanagan: tqłəníw̓t/tqaʔtkʷɬniwt) is a self-governing First Nations band in the Okanagan region of British Columbia, Canada, and is one of eight bands that comprise the Okanagan Nation Alliance of Syilx people. Westbank First Nation (WFN) is governed by one chief (Chief Robert Louie) and four councillors, elected every three years by WFN membership (the current term is 2023-2025). As of April 2019, WFN's membership totaled 914 members, and employs more than 200 people.

== Government ==
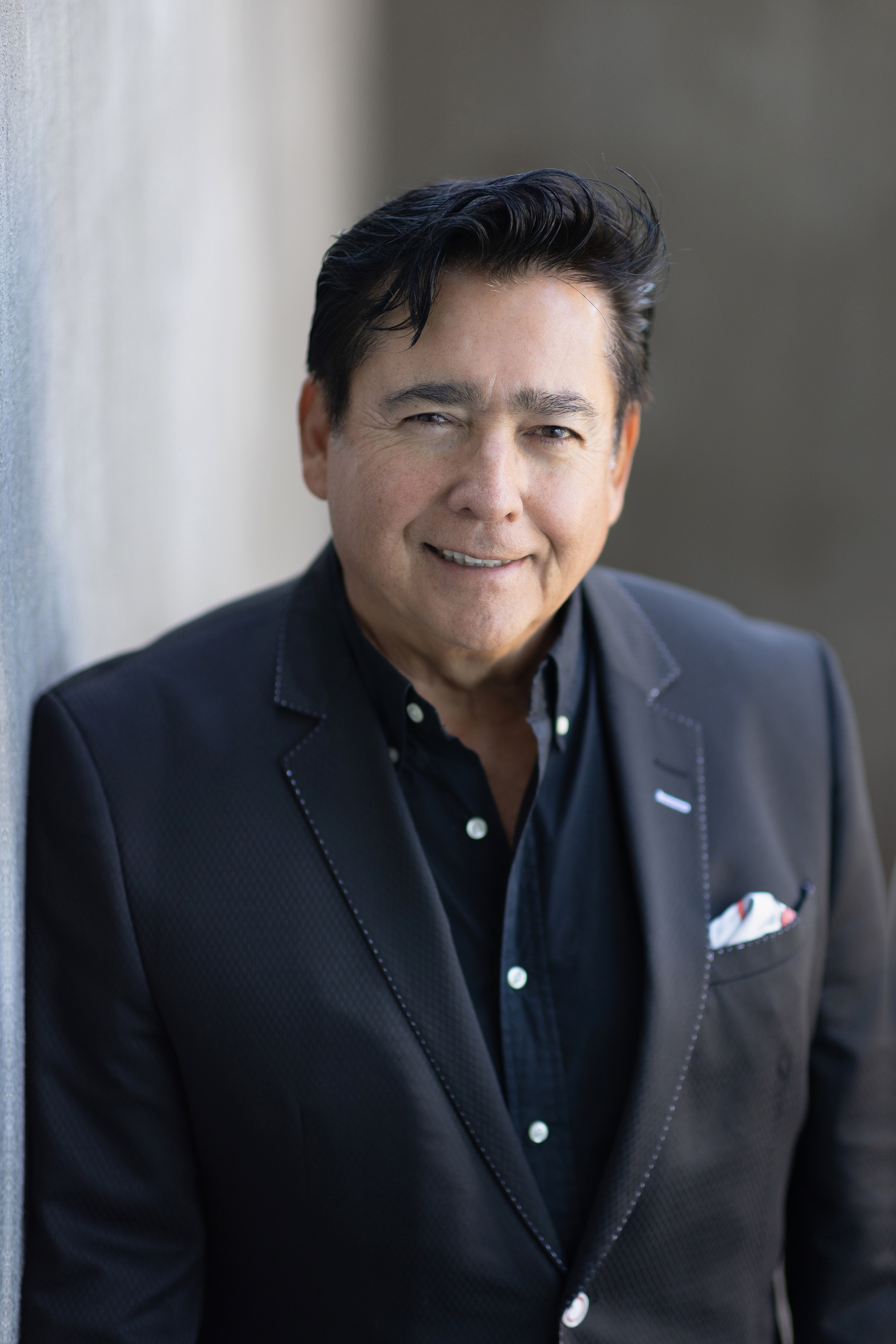
Robert Louie, Chief Westbank First Nation

Westbank reserves were once part of the Okanagan Indian Band until they separated and became an independent band in 1963. 27 years later, in 1990, a framework agreement was entered into which allowed community-based self-government to be negotiated. On May 6, 2004, the Westbank First Nation Self-Government Act received royal assent and became law. WFN self-government officially came into force April 1, 2005.

Indigenous self-government in Canada is an agreement between an Indigenous community and provincial and federal government. It allows the community to make all decisions regarding their people, laws, land, and resources.

Following the enactment of self-government, WFN members developed the Westbank First Nation constitution, which sets out how the community is governed and how it exercises its jurisdiction. Some of the other areas the constitution provides for are democratic and legitimate elections and government; internal financial management; accountability to WFN members; conflict of interest rules; law enactment procedures; land rules and referendum procedures.

== Advisory Council ==
In 2005, following the signing of self-government, the WFN Advisory Council was put in place. The Advisory Council is a five-member council, elected every three years by WFN residents, that meets regularly to review and make recommendations on issues that directly and significantly affect taxpayers such as tax expenditures, proposed laws and proposed amendments to laws. Currently there are approximately 11,000 non-WFN member residents living on WFN lands.

== Language ==
Westbank First Nation people are united through their culture, customs, and language, nsyilxcən/nqilxʷcən. nsyilxcən, an Interior Salish language, is the traditional language of Westbank First Nation. In the entire Okanagan Nation population, there are 6,331 people. 1.3% are fluent speakers, 6.6% are semi-speakers, and 16% are active learners. The nsyilxcən language holds thousands of years of knowledge of the land and contains teachings about natural laws. As syilx/Okanagan people, it is understood that humans are to act as caretakers of nxʷəlxʷəltantət, that which gives us life, including language and land.

Westbank First Nation has created nsyilxcən learning resources for anyone wishing to learn the language. In the nsyilxcən/nqilxʷcən language, capital letters are not used because it insinuates that someone or something holds more importance than another, and this belief does not fall in line with syilx ethics.

Westbank First Nation has a museum which provides a protected place for sqilxʷ culture and heritage while actively working to uplift syilx voices and share about the traditional, ancestral, and unceded territory of the syilx people. The museum does guided tours and shares stories of the land with all who are interested in learning. sncəwips is the nsyilxcən word that translates to ‘a conversation with an ancestor’.

== Indian Reserves ==
Westbank First Nation's land base totals 5,340 acres, separated into five land parcels. Westbank First Nation's two populated reserves border the westside of Okanagan Lake and are located adjacent to the City of West Kelowna, while the remaining three reserves are located on the east side of Okanagan Lake. Indian reserves under the jurisdiction of the Westbank First Nation are:

- Tsinstikeptum Indian Reserve No. 9, 641.8 ha., 6 miles southwest of the City of Kelowna,
- Tsinstikeptum Indian Reserve No. 10, 339 ha., immediately opposite the City of Kelowna,
- Medicine Creek Indian Reserve No. 12, 662.50 ha., 10 km southeast of downtown Kelowna,
- Medicine Hill Indian Reserve No. 11, 515.70 ha., 15 km southeast of downtown Kelowna,
- Mission Creek Indian Reserve No. 8, 2 ha., on left bank of Mission Creek 1 mile from Okanagan Lake, 2 miles south of downtown Kelowna
