= Robert Louie =

Canadian First Nations leader

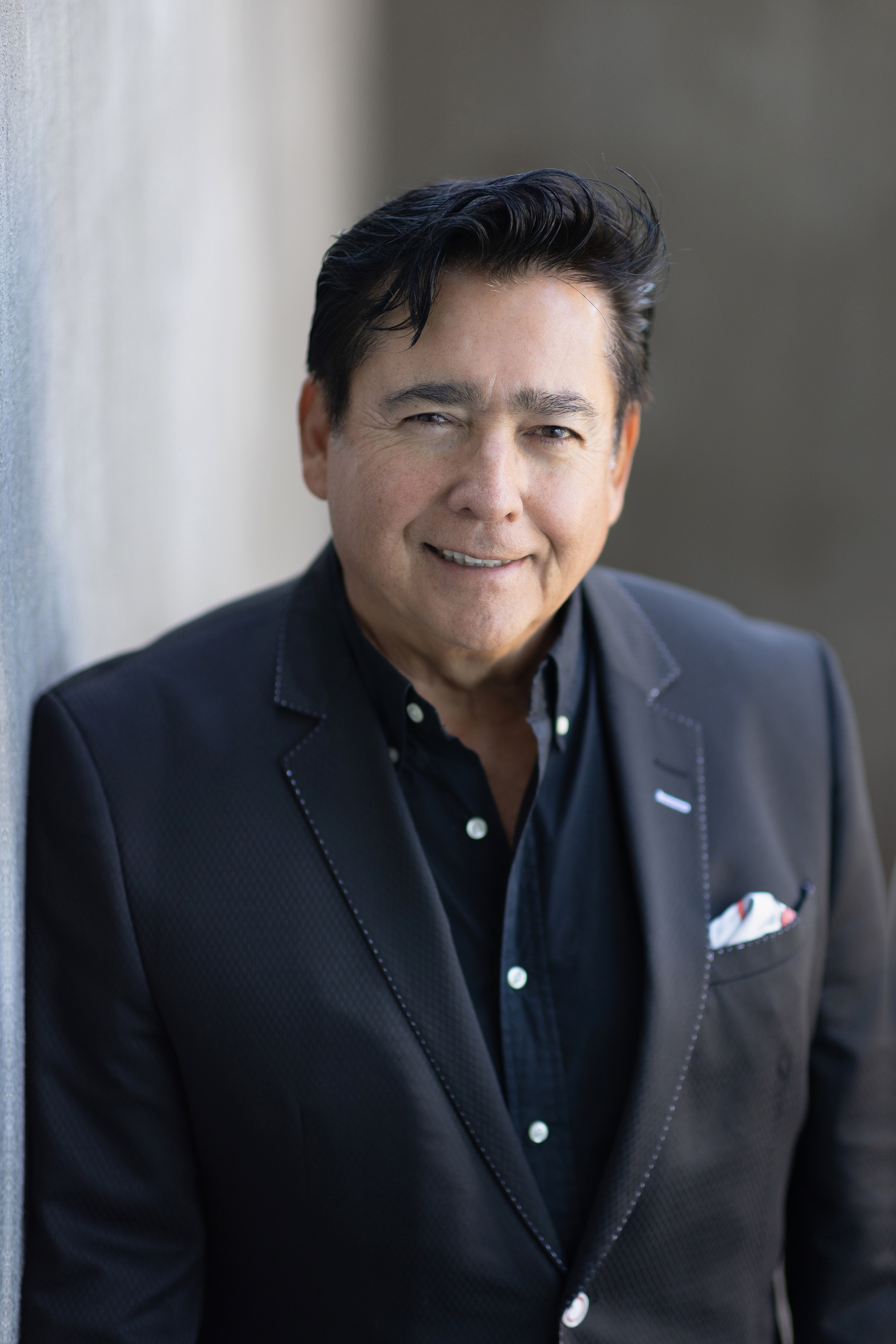
Robert Louie, Chief Westbank First Nation

Robert Louie is a Canadian First Nations leader and business person. He is known especially for his role in negotiating the Westbank Self-Government Agreement, which granted his band control over land management, language, and culture.

== Early life and education ==
Born in 1959, he received a diploma in Business Administration, Management, and Operations from Okanagan College in 1975 and his LL.B. from the University of Victoria in 1982.

== Political career ==
He was chief of the Westbank First Nation from 1986 to 1996 and from 2002 to 2016 and served on the Task Group of the First Nations Summit. In September, 2022 he was returned to his former position as Westbank chief.

== Business ==
Since 2014 he has owned and operated Indigenous World, a collection of businesses With his wife Bernice, Louie founded the Indigenous World Winery, some of whose wines have won awards.

== Service ==
He has been Chairman of the First Nations Lands Advisory Board since 1989 and of the Audit Committee of Peace Hills Trust since 2012.

He has served on the boards of the University of British Columbia (2006-2007), the National Aboriginal Economic Development Board (1996-1999), the First Nations Finance Authority (1995-1997), the All Nations Trust Company (1988-1991) the Kelowna Chamber of Commerce (1986--1987) the United Nations Friendship Society (1985-1986) and the BC Small Business Roundtable (2004-2006) and on the President's Advisory Council of the University of British Columbia Okanagan and the Premier's Advisory Council on Aboriginal Affairs].

== Honours ==
In 2006 he was honoured as an Officer of the Order of Canada.

He received the Queen Elizabeth II Diamond Jubilee Medal in 2012, an Honorary Doctor of Laws from the Justice Institute of British Columbia in 2014 and the B.C. Aboriginal Business Lifetime Achievement Award in 2016.

In 2022 he received the Canadian Council for Aboriginal Business Lifetime Achievement Award.
