= Regional district =

Administrative subdivision in British Columbia

Regional districts of British Columbia
- Location: British Columbia
- Number: 27
- Populations: 683 (Stikine Region) – 2,642,825 (Metro Vancouver)
- Areas: 1,697 km^{2} (655 sq mi) (Comox Valley) – 118,409 km^{2} (45,718 sq mi) (Stikine Region)
- Government: Municipal government
- Subdivisions: Municipalities (cities, district municipalities, Indian government districts, island municipalities, mountain resort municipalities, regional municipalities, resort municipalities, towns, and villages) and Indian reserves

In the province of British Columbia in Canada, a regional district is an administrative subdivision of the province that consists of a geographic region with specific boundaries and governmental authority. As of January 2020, there were 27 regional districts in the province. Regional districts should not be confused with counties of British Columbia, which function as court house boundaries solely for the administration of justice.

== History ==
Regional districts came into being as an order of government in 1965 with the enactment of amendments to the Municipal Act. Until the creation of regional districts, the only local form of government in British Columbia was incorporated municipalities, and services in areas outside municipal boundaries had to be sought from the province or through improvement districts.

== Government structure ==
Similar to counties in other parts of Canada, regional districts serve only to provide municipal services as the local government in areas not incorporated into a municipality, and in certain regional affairs of shared concern between residents of unincorporated areas and those in the municipalities such as a stakeholder role in regional planning. In those predominantly rural areas, regional districts provide services such as land use planning, building inspection, solid-waste management, and some responsibility for community fire protection.

Most land nominally within a regional district is under the control of the provincial government, or in the case of national parks and offshore waters, the federal government. Indian reserves located within the boundaries of regional districts are likewise excluded from their jurisdiction and infrastructure, and there are varying levels of collaboration between First Nations governments and regional district boards.

Regional districts are governed by boards of directly and indirectly elected directors. Municipalities appoint directors to represent their populations (usually the mayors), while residents of unincorporated areas (which are grouped into electoral areas) elect directors directly. The votes of directors from municipalities generally count more than the votes of directors from electoral areas, and larger municipalities have more votes than smaller ones. For example, both North Saanich and Metchosin appoint one director to the Capital Regional District board of directors, but the vote of North Saanich's director counts three times as much as the vote of Metchosin's appointee.

== See also ==
- List of municipalities in British Columbia
