= Tsinstikeptum Indian Reserve No. 9 =

Coordinates: 49°51′N 119°36′W

Tsinstikeptum 9, usually referred to as Tsinstikeptum Indian Reserve No. 9, is one of two Indian Reserves of the Westbank First Nation located adjacent to West Kelowna, British Columbia, Canada. It and Tsinstikeptum Indian Reserve No. 10 are jointly normally referred to as the Westbank Indian Reserve. Tsinstikeptum Indian Reserve No. 9 is located six miles southwest of Kelowna proper, adjacent to McDougall Creek. The reserve is 641.80 ha in area. The southernmost portion of the reserve lies on the shores of Okanagan Lake.

== Demographics ==
In the Canada 2011 Census, Tsinstikeptum 9 had a population of 5,882, making it Canada's second-most populous Indian reserve that is designated as a census subdivision (following Six Nations 40 in Ontario). However, the majority of Tsinstikeptum 9's residents are non-aboriginal. The total registered population of the Westbank First Nation among all five of its reserves, including off-reserve members, is only 784.

== See also ==
- List of Indian Reserves in British Columbia
- Tsinstikeptum Indian Reserve No. 10 (Westbank Reserve)
