= Tsinstikeptum Indian Reserve No. 10 =

Of the Westbank First Nation in British Columbia, Canada

Coordinates: 49°53′N 119°32′W

Tsinstikeptum 10, usually referred to as Tsinstikeptum Indian Reserve No. 10, is one of two Indian Reserves of the Westbank First Nation located in West Kelowna, British Columbia, Canada. It and Tsinstikeptum Indian Reserve No. 9 are jointly normally referred to as the Westbank Indian Reserve. Tsinstikeptum Indian Reserve No. 10, which is 339 ha. in area, is located opposite the City of Kelowna proper, across Okanagan Lake.

== Demographics ==
As a census subdivision in the Canada 2011 Census, Tsinstikeptum 10 had a population of 1,186, of which the majority were non-aboriginal residents. The total registered population of the Westbank First Nation among all five of its reserves, including off-reserve members, is only 784.

== See also ==
- List of Indian reserves in British Columbia
- Tsinstikeptum Indian Reserve No. 9
