= List of towns in British Columbia =

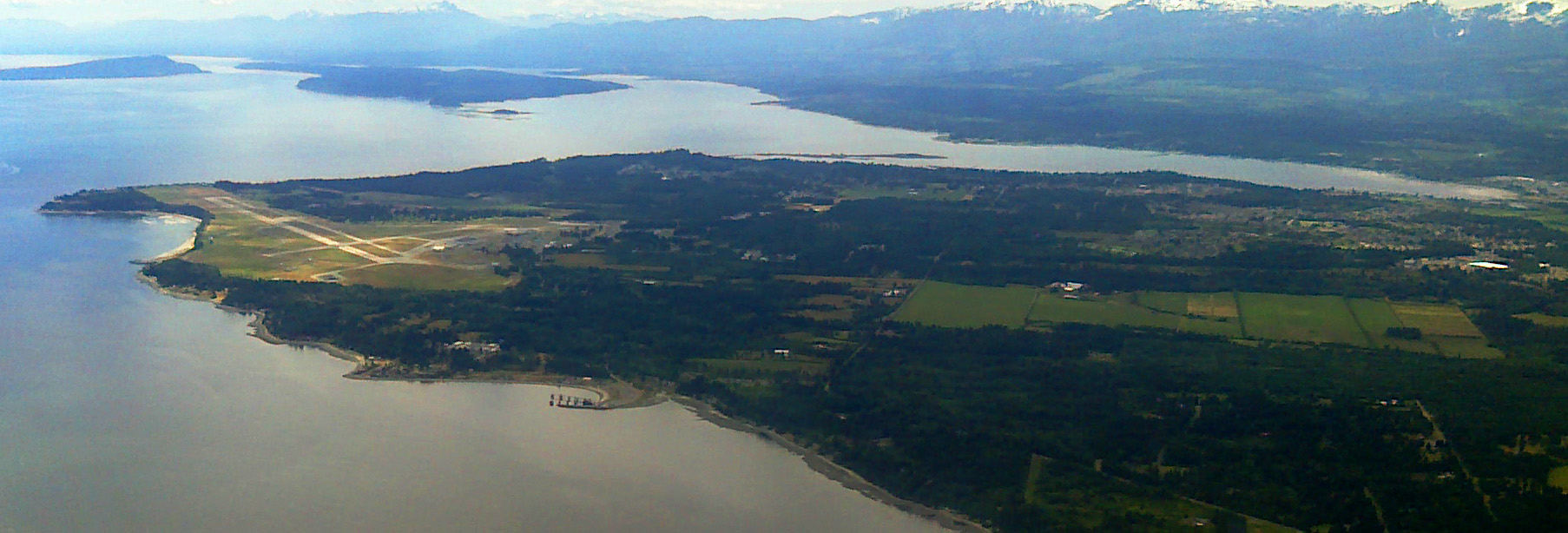
Comox is the largest town in British Columbia by population.

British Columbia has 161 municipalities, out of which 14 are classified as towns. According to the 2021 Canadian census, British Columbia is the third most populous province in Canada, with 5,000,879 inhabitants, and the fourth largest province by land area, covering 920,686.55 km^{2} (355,479.06 sq mi).

Towns, cities, district municipalities and villages in British Columbia are referred to as municipalities and all are included in local governments, which may be incorporated under the Local Government Act of 2015. In order for a municipality in British Columbia to be classified as a town, it must have a minimum population of 2,500, and a maximum population of 5,000. Although the population of Port McNeill falls below this threshold, it is still classified as a town, as are nine settlements with populations greater than 5,000. All municipalities have councils.

The largest town by population in British Columbia is Comox, with 14,806 residents, and the smallest is Port McNeill, with 2,356 residents. The largest town by land area is Princeton, which spans 59.28 km^{2} (22.89 sq mi), while the smallest is Gibsons, at 4.31 km^{2} (1.66 sq mi). The first town to incorporate was Ladysmith on June 3, 1904 (although it was originally a city before becoming a village and then finally a town in 1965), while the province's newest town is View Royal, which incorporated on December 5, 1988

== Towns ==
Towns in British Columbia
Name	Regional district	2021 Census of Population					Incorporation date as a town
Name	Regional district	Population (2021)	Population (2016)	Change (%)	Area (km^{2})	Population density	Incorporation date as a town
Comox	Comox Valley	14,806	14,028	+5.55%	16.87 km^{2}	877.7/km^{2}	January 14, 1946
Creston	Central Kootenay	5,583	5,361	+4.14%	8.41 km^{2}	664.2/km^{2}	May 14, 1924
Gibsons	Sunshine Coast	4,758	4,605	+3.32%	4.31 km^{2}	1,103.2/km^{2}	March 4, 1929
Golden	Columbia Shuswap	3,986	3,708	+7.50%	11.33 km^{2}	351.9/km^{2}	June 26, 1957
Ladysmith	Cowichan Valley	8,990	8,537	+5.31%	12.04 km^{2}	746.5/km^{2}	June 3, 1904
Lake Cowichan	Cowichan Valley	3,325	3,226	+3.07%	8.24 km^{2}	403.5/km^{2}	August 19, 1944
Oliver	Okanagan-Similkameen	5,094	4,928	+3.37%	5.49 km^{2}	927.9/km^{2}	December 31, 1945
Osoyoos	Okanagan-Similkameen	5,556	5,050	+10.02%	8.56 km^{2}	660.7/km^{2}	January 14, 1946
Port McNeill	Mount Waddington	2,356	2,337	+0.81%	13.77 km^{2}	171.1/km^{2}	February 18, 1966
Princeton	Okanagan-Similkameen	2,894	2,828	+2.33%	59.28 km^{2}	48.8/km^{2}	September 11, 1951
Qualicum Beach	Nanaimo	9,303	8,943	+4.03%	17.98 km^{2}	517.5/km^{2}	May 5, 1942
Sidney	Capital	12,318	11,672	+5.53%	5.11 km^{2}	2,412.8/km^{2}	September 30, 1952
Smithers	Bulkley-Nechako	5,378	5,401	−0.43%	15.26 km^{2}	352.4/km^{2}	October 6, 1921
View Royal	Capital	11,575	10,408	+11.21%	14.33 km^{2}	807.6/km^{2}	December 5, 1988
Total towns		95,922	91,032	+5.37%	200.98 km^{2}	717.56/km^{2}	—
British Columbia		5,000,879	4,648,055	+7.59%	920,686.55 km^{2}	5.4/km^{2}	—

=== Former towns ===
Fort Nelson, originally incorporated as a village on April 8, 1971, became a town on October 31, 1987, and then amalgamated with the Northern Rockies Regional District on February 6, 2009, to form the Northern Rockies Regional Municipality. Kinnaird, originally incorporated as a village on August 6, 1948, became a town on August 5, 1967, and then amalgamated with the Town of Castlegar on January 1, 1974, to form the City of Castlegar. Mission City, originally incorporated as a village on December 12, 1939, became a town on January 1, 1958, and then combined with the District of Mission on November 1, 1969.

== See also ==
- List of communities in British Columbia
- List of municipalities in British Columbia
  - List of cities in British Columbia
  - List of district municipalities in British Columbia
  - List of villages in British Columbia
