= List of district municipalities in British Columbia =

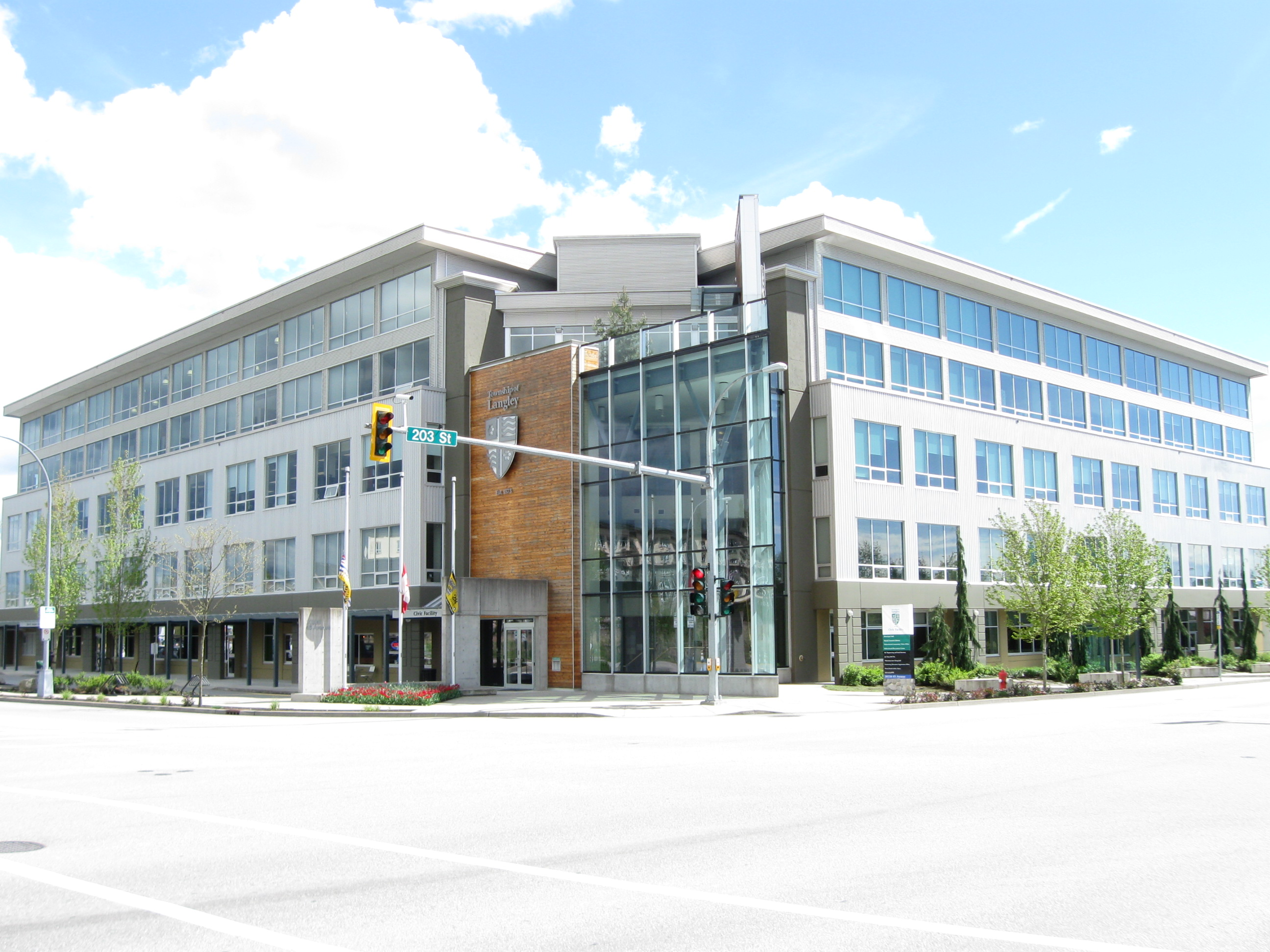
Langley is the largest district municipality by population.

A district municipality is a type of municipal classification used in the Canadian province of British Columbia. District municipalities are generally larger in geographic size and have population densities that are lower compared to the province's other classifications – cities, towns, and villages. Of British Columbia's 161 municipalities, 48 are classified as district municipalities.

District municipalities can be incorporated under the authority of British Columbia's Local Government Act. In order for a municipality to be classified as a district municipality, its geographic area must be greater than 800 hectares (2,000 acres) and its population density must be lower than 5 residents per hectare (or 500/km^{2}); there is no population requirement. These classification requirements are not strictly applied however as five district municipalities – Esquimalt, North Vancouver, Oak Bay, Saanich and West Vancouver – have higher population densities.

According to Canada's 2021 Census of Population, the largest district municipality by population in British Columbia is Langley, with 132,603 residents, and the smallest is the Wells, with 218 residents. The largest district municipality by land area is Northern Rockies, which spans 84,759.31 km^{2} (32,725.75 sq mi), while the smallest is Ucluelet, at 6.48 km^{2} (2.50 sq mi). The first municipality to incorporate as a district municipality was North Cowichan on June 18, 1873, while the province's newest is Northern Rockies, which incorporated on February 6, 2009.

== Branding ==
Three district municipalities – Esquimalt, Langley, and Spallumcheen – are branded as townships in their official corporate names. Townships are a former municipal classification that are now classified as district municipalities. Also, although branded as a regional municipality in its official corporate name, the Northern Rockies Regional Municipality is classified as a district municipality.

== Governance ==
All district municipalities have elected councils. The 48 district municipalities are governed by a total of 324 elected officials including 48 mayors and 276 councillors. Invermere has the smallest district municipal council at four elected officials while Langley and Saanich both have nine elected officials each. In addition to the provision of municipal services, the Local Government Act empowers district municipalities the ability to deliver drainage projects.

== List ==
District municipalities in British Columbia
Name	Corporate name	Regional district	Incorporation date	Council size	2021 Census of Population				
Name	Corporate name	Regional district	Incorporation date	Council size	Population (2021)	Population (2016)	Change (%)	Land area	Population density
100 Mile House	100 Mile House, District of	Cariboo	July 27, 1965	5	1,928	1,918	+0.52%	53.01 km^{2}	36.4/km^{2}
Barriere	Barriere, District of	Thompson-Nicola	December 4, 2007	7	1,765	1,713	+3.04%	10.73 km^{2}	164.5/km^{2}
Central Saanich	Central Saanich, The Corporation of the District of	Capital	December 12, 1950	7	17,385	16,814	+3.40%	41.20 km^{2}	421.9/km^{2}
Chetwynd	Chetwynd, District of	Peace River	September 25, 1962	7	2,302	2,503	−8.03%	63.55 km^{2}	36.2/km^{2}
Clearwater	Clearwater, District of	Thompson-Nicola	December 3, 2007	7	2,388	2,324	+2.75%	55.65 km^{2}	42.9/km^{2}
Coldstream	Coldstream, The Corporation of the District of	North Okanagan	December 21, 1906	7	11,171	10,648	+4.91%	66.57 km^{2}	167.8/km^{2}
Elkford	Elkford, District of	East Kootenay	July 16, 1971	7	2,749	2,499	+10.00%	108.12 km^{2}	25.4/km^{2}
Esquimalt	Esquimalt, Corporation of the Township of	Capital	September 1, 1912	7	17,533	17,655	−0.69%	7.08 km^{2}	2,476.7/km^{2}
Fort St. James	Fort St. James, District of	Bulkley-Nechako	December 19, 1952	7	1,386	1,598	−13.27%	23.45 km^{2}	59.1/km^{2}
Highlands	Highlands, District of	Capital	December 7, 1993	7	2,482	2,225	+11.55%	38.01 km^{2}	65.3/km^{2}
Hope	Hope, District of	Fraser Valley	April 6, 1929	7	6,686	6,181	+8.17%	40.87 km^{2}	163.6/km^{2}
Houston	Houston, District of	Bulkley-Nechako	March 4, 1957	7	3,052	2,993	+1.97%	72.88 km^{2}	41.9/km^{2}
Hudson's Hope	Hudson's Hope, District of	Peace River	November 16, 1965	7	841	1,015	−17.14%	826.70 km^{2}	1.0/km^{2}
Invermere	Invermere, District of	East Kootenay	May 22, 1951	4	3,917	3,391	+15.51%	10.75 km^{2}	364.4/km^{2}
Kent	Kent, The Corporation of the District of	Fraser Valley	January 1, 1895	5	6,300	6,067	+3.84%	168.59 km^{2}	37.4/km^{2}
Kitimat	Kitimat, District of	Kitimat-Stikine	March 31, 1953	7	8,236	8,131	+1.29%	239.28 km^{2}	34.4/km^{2}
Lake Country	Lake Country, District of	Central Okanagan	May 2, 1995	7	15,817	12,922	+22.40%	122.16 km^{2}	129.5/km^{2}
Langley	Langley, The Corporation of the Township of	Greater Vancouver	April 26, 1873	9	132,603	117,285	+13.06%	307.22 km^{2}	431.6/km^{2}
Lantzville	Lantzville, District of	Nanaimo	June 25, 2003	5	3,817	3,605	+5.88%	27.68 km^{2}	137.9/km^{2}
Lillooet	Lillooet, District of	Squamish-Lillooet	December 31, 1946	5	2,302	2,275	+1.19%	27.63 km^{2}	83.3/km^{2}
Logan Lake	Logan Lake, District of	Thompson-Nicola	November 10, 1970	7	2,255	1,993	+13.15%	324.28 km^{2}	7.0/km^{2}
Mackenzie	Mackenzie, District of	Fraser-Fort George	May 19, 1966	7	3,281	3,714	−11.66%	154.19 km^{2}	21.3/km^{2}
Metchosin	Metchosin, District of	Capital	December 3, 1984	5	5,067	4,708	+7.63%	69.57 km^{2}	72.8/km^{2}
New Hazelton	New Hazelton, District of	Kitimat-Stikine	December 15, 1980	7	602	580	+3.79%	24.34 km^{2}	24.7/km^{2}
North Cowichan	North Cowichan, The Corporation of the District of	Cowichan Valley	June 18, 1873	7	31,990	29,696	+7.72%	195.41 km^{2}	163.7/km^{2}
North Saanich	North Saanich, District of	Capital	August 19, 1965	7	12,235	11,249	+8.77%	37.16 km^{2}	329.2/km^{2}
North Vancouver	North Vancouver, The Corporation of the District of	Greater Vancouver	May 13, 1907	7	88,168	85,649	+2.94%	160.66 km^{2}	548.8/km^{2}
Northern Rockies	Northern Rockies Regional Municipality	Northern Rockies	February 6, 2009	7	3,947	4,862	−18.82%	84,759.31 km^{2}	0.0/km^{2}
Oak Bay	Oak Bay, The Corporation of the District of	Capital	July 2, 1906	7	17,990	18,094	−0.57%	10.52 km^{2}	1,710.1/km^{2}
Okanagan Falls	Okanagan Falls, District of	Central Okanagan, British Columbia	November 6, 2026	5	2,266	--	--	--	--
Peachland	Peachland, The Corporation of the District of	Central Okanagan	January 1, 1909	7	5,789	5,428	+6.65%	16.10 km^{2}	359.6/km^{2}
Port Edward	Port Edward, District of	Skeena-Queen Charlotte	June 29, 1966	5	470	467	+0.64%	167.16 km^{2}	2.8/km^{2}
Port Hardy	Port Hardy, District of	Mount Waddington	May 5, 1966	7	3,902	4,132	−5.57%	38.55 km^{2}	101.2/km^{2}
Saanich	Saanich, The Corporation of the District of	Capital	March 1, 1906	9	117,735	114,148	+3.14%	103.59 km^{2}	1,136.6/km^{2}
Sechelt	Sechelt, District of	Sunshine Coast	February 15, 1956	7	10,847	10,216	+6.18%	39.02 km^{2}	278.0/km^{2}
Sicamous	Sicamous, District of	Columbia Shuswap	December 4, 1989	7	2,613	2,429	+7.58%	12.80 km^{2}	204.2/km^{2}
Sooke	Sooke, District of	Capital	December 7, 1999	7	15,086	13,001	+16.04%	56.60 km^{2}	266.6/km^{2}
Spallumcheen	Spallumcheen, The Corporation of the Township of	North Okanagan	July 21, 1892	7	5,307	5,106	+3.94%	254.92 km^{2}	20.8/km^{2}
Sparwood	Sparwood, District of	East Kootenay	October 6, 1964	7	4,148	3,784	+9.62%	191.30 km^{2}	21.7/km^{2}
Squamish	Squamish, District of	Squamish-Lillooet	May 18, 1948	7	23,819	19,497	+22.17%	104.71 km^{2}	227.5/km^{2}
Stewart	Stewart, District of	Kitimat-Stikine	May 16, 1930	7	517	401	+28.93%	551.57 km^{2}	0.9/km^{2}
Summerland	Summerland, The Corporation of the District of	Okanagan-Similkameen	December 21, 1906	7	12,042	11,615	+3.68%	74.04 km^{2}	162.6/km^{2}
Taylor	Taylor, District of	Peace River	August 23, 1958	5	1,317	1,469	−10.35%	16.92 km^{2}	77.8/km^{2}
Tofino	Tofino, District of	Alberni-Clayoquot	February 5, 1932	7	2,516	1,967	+27.91%	10.56 km^{2}	238.3/km^{2}
Tumbler Ridge (Note: Incorporated in 1981, Tumbler Ridge was developed as a company town by Denison Mines, Teck Corporation and the Japanese Steel Industry in cooperation with the Government of British Columbia.)	Tumbler Ridge, District of	Peace River	April 9, 1981	7	2,399	1,987	+20.73%	1,557.41 km^{2}	1.5/km^{2}
Ucluelet	Ucluelet, District of	Alberni-Clayoquot	February 26, 1952	5	2,066	1,717	+20.33%	6.48 km^{2}	318.8/km^{2}
Vanderhoof	Vanderhoof, District of	Bulkley-Nechako	January 22, 1926	7	4,346	4,434	−1.98%	53.93 km^{2}	80.6/km^{2}
Wells (Note: Wells was founded as a company town for the Cariboo Gold Quartz Mine.)	Wells, District of	Cariboo	June 29, 1998	5	218	217	+0.46%	158.09 km^{2}	1.4/km^{2}
West Vancouver	West Vancouver, The Corporation of the District of	Greater Vancouver	March 15, 1912	7	44,122	42,473	+3.88%	87.18 km^{2}	506.1/km^{2}
Total district municipalities				329	671720	628,795	+6.47%	91,547.50 km^{2}	7.3/km^{2}
British Columbia				1,056	5,003,155	4,648,055	+7.59%	920,686.55 km^{2}	5.4/km^{2}

== Former district municipalities ==
- Abbotsfield – The District of Abbotsford amalgamated with the District of Matsqui on January 1, 1995 to form the City of Abbotsford.
- Brocklehurst – Brocklehurst amalgamated with the City of Kamloops on May 1, 1973 shortly after incorporating as a district municipality on June 22, 1971.
- Burnaby – The Corporation of the District of Burnaby held the district municipality classification for exactly 110 years from incorporation on September 22, 1892 to reclassification as a city on September 22, 1992.
- Chilliwack – The District of Chilliwack was formed on January 1, 1980 following the amalgamation of the original City of Chilliwack with the Corporation of the Township of Chilliwhack.
- Coquitlam – Coquitlam held the district municipality classification for just over 100 years from incorporation on July 25, 1891 to reclassification as a city on January 1, 1992.
- Delta – The City of Delta was classified as a district municipality prior to September 22, 2017.
- Dufferin – Dufferin amalgamated with the City of Kamloops on May 1, 1973 shortly after incorporating as a district municipality on April 23, 1971.
- Maple Ridge – The City of Maple Ridge was classified as a district municipality prior to September 12, 2014.
- Matsqui – The Corporation of the District of Matsqui was incorporated on November 26, 1892. It then amalgamated with the District of Abbotsford on January 1, 1995.
- Mission – The City of Mission was classified as a district municipality prior to March 29, 2021.
- Penticton – Penticton held the district municipality classification from incorporation on January 1, 1909 to reclassification as a city on May 10, 1948.
- Pitt Meadows – Pitt Meadows held the district municipality classification from incorporation on April 1, 1914 to reclassification as a city on January 1, 2007.
- Richmond – Originally incorporated on November 10, 1879, Richmond held the district municipality classification prior to incorporating as a city on December 3, 1990.
- Salmon Arm – Salmon Arm held the district municipality classification for just shy of 100 years from incorporation on May 15, 1905 to reclassification as a city on May 14, 2005.
- Sumas – The District of Sumas amalgamated with the Village of Abbotsford on November 17, 1972 to create the District of Abbotsford.
- Surrey – Surrey held the district municipality classification for nearly 114 years from incorporation on November 10, 1879 to reclassification as a city on September 11, 1993.
- Terrace – Originally a village, Terrace held the district municipality classification from incorporation on January 1, 1960 to reclassification as a city on January 22, 1987.
- White Rock – The City of White Rock was classified as a district municipality prior to June 26, 2015.

== See also ==
- List of communities in British Columbia
- List of municipalities in British Columbia
  - List of cities in British Columbia
  - List of towns in British Columbia
  - List of villages in British Columbia
- List of regional districts in British Columbia
