= List of cities in British Columbia =

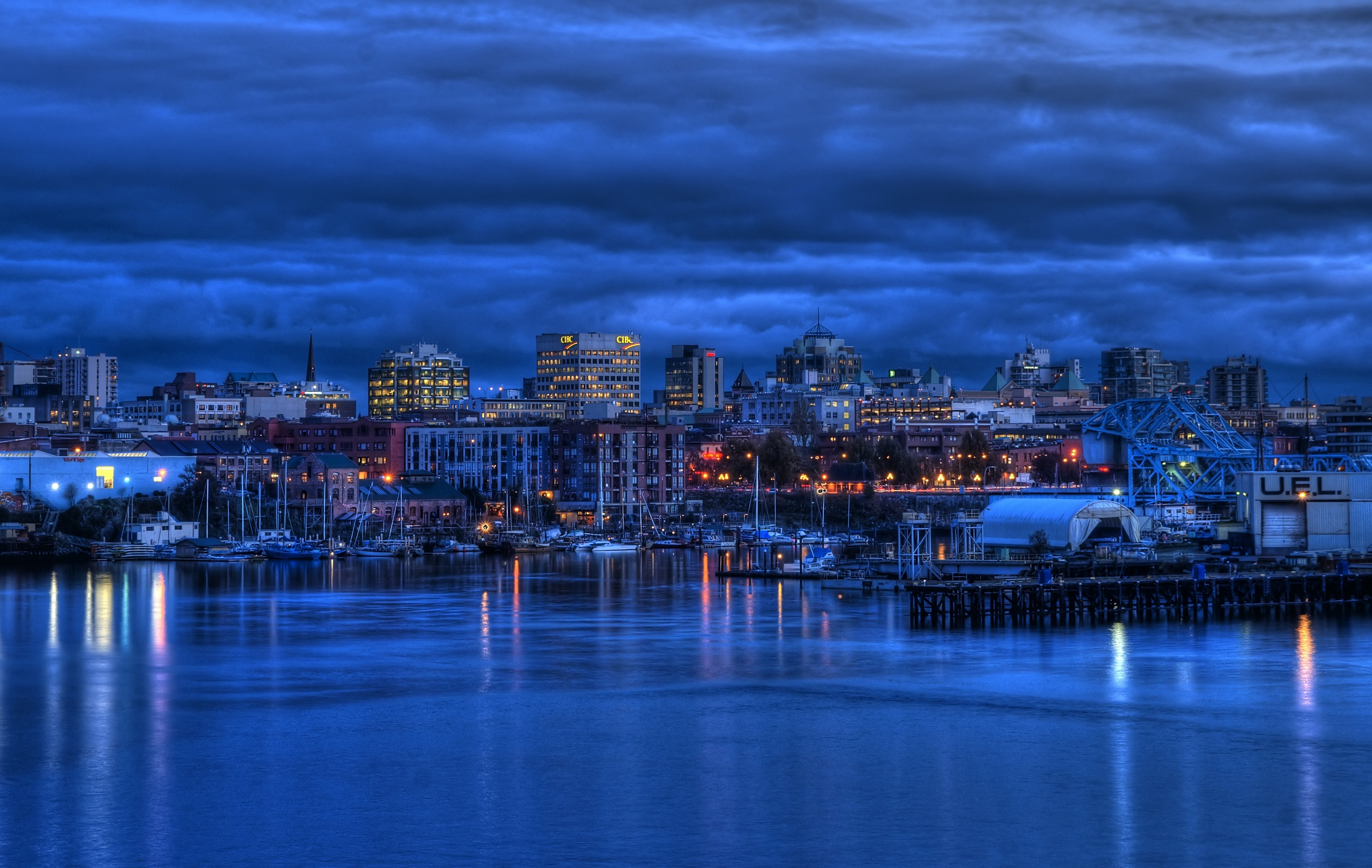
Victoria is the capital city of British Columbia.

As of 2024, British Columbia has 161 municipalities, out of which 53 are classified as cities. According to the 2021 Canadian census, British Columbia is the third most populous province in Canada, with 5,000,879 inhabitants, and the second largest province by land area, covering 920,686.55 square kilometres (355,479.06 square miles).

Cities, towns, district municipalities and villages in British Columbia are referred to as municipalities and all are included in local governments in the province, which may be incorporated under the Local Government Act of 2015. In order for a municipality in British Columbia to be classified as a city, it must have a minimum population of 5,000. Although the populations of Enderby, Grand Forks, Greenwood and Rossland fall below this threshold, they are still classified as cities.

The largest city by population in British Columbia is Vancouver, with 662,248 residents, and the smallest is Greenwood, with 702 residents. The largest city by land area is Abbotsford, which spans 375.55 square kilometres (145.00 square miles), while the smallest is Duncan, at 2.07 square kilometres (0.80 square miles). The first municipality to incorporate as a city was New Westminster on July 16, 1860, while the province's newest city is Mission, a district municipality that was reclassified as a city on March 29, 2021. Victoria is the capital city of British Columbia.

== Cities ==
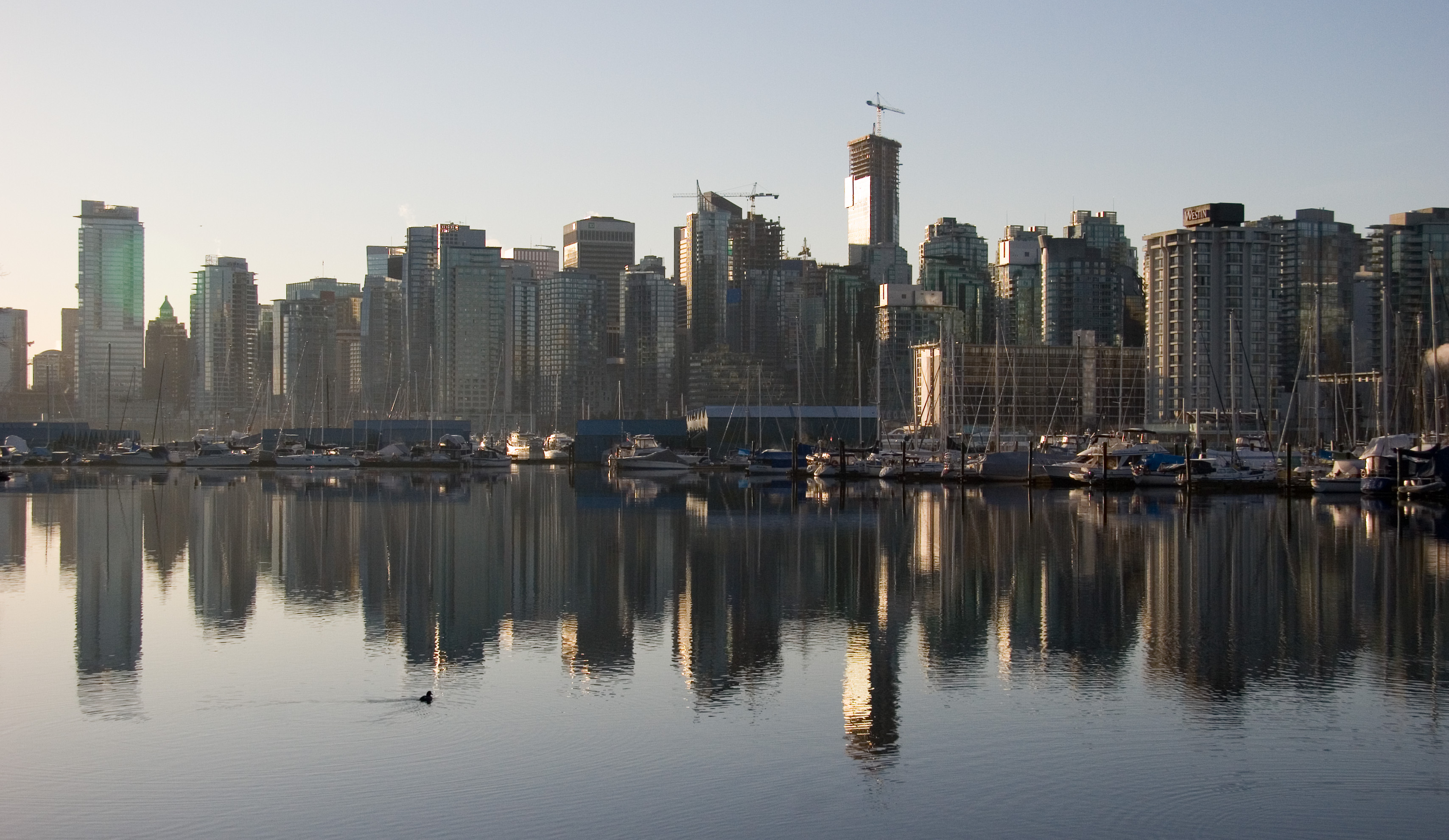
Vancouver is the largest city in British Columbia by population.

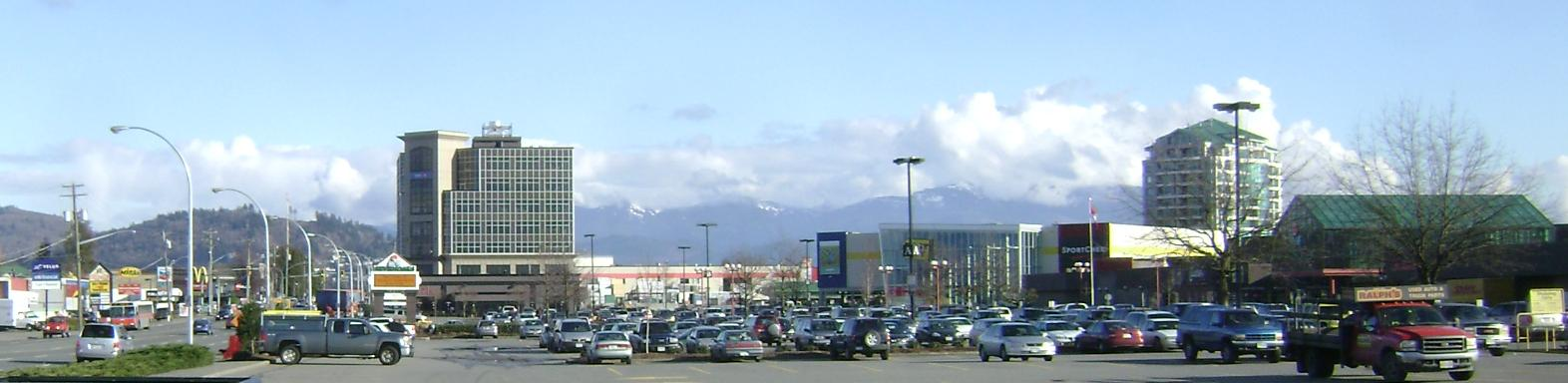
Abbotsford is the largest city in British Columbia by area.

Cities in British Columbia
Name	Regional district	Incorporation date	Council size	Population (2021)	Population (2016)	Change (%)	Area (km^{2})	Population density (people/km^{2})
Abbotsford	Fraser Valley	December 12, 1995	9	153,524	141,397	8.6	375.33	409.0
Armstrong	North Okanagan	March 31, 1913	7	5,323	5,114	4.1	5.22	1020.0
Burnaby	Metro Vancouver	September 22, 1892	9	249,125	232,755	7.0	90.57	2750.7
Campbell River	Strathcona	June 24, 1947	7	35,519	33,007	7.6	144.38	246.0
Castlegar	Central Kootenay	January 1, 1974	7	8,338	8,039	3.7	19.87	419.6
Chilliwack	Fraser Valley	April 26, 1873	7	93,203	83,788	11.2	261.34	356.6
Colwood	Capital	June 24, 1985	7	18,961	16,859	12.5	17.66	1073.6
Coquitlam	Metro Vancouver	July 25, 1891	9	148,625	139,284	6.7	122.15	1216.7
Courtenay	Comox Valley	January 1, 1915	7	28,420	25,639	10.8	32.42	876.7
Cranbrook	East Kootenay	November 1, 1905	7	20,499	20,047	2.3	31.97	641.2
Dawson Creek	Peace River	May 26, 1936	7	12,323	12,178	1.2	26.72	461.1
Delta	Metro Vancouver	September 22, 2017	7	108,455	102,238	6.1	179.66	603.7
Duncan	Cowichan Valley	March 4, 1912	7	5,047	4,944	2.1	2.06	2444.5
Enderby	North Okanagan	March 1, 1905	7	3,028	2,964	2.2	4.26	710.4
Fernie	East Kootenay	July 28, 1904	7	6,320	5,396	17.1	15.11	418.3
Fort St. John	Peace River	December 31, 1947	7	21,465	20,260	5.9	32.67	656.9
Grand Forks	Kootenay Boundary	April 15, 1897	7	4,112	4,049	1.6	10.37	396.4
Greenwood	Kootenay Boundary	July 12, 1897	5	702	665	5.6	2.42	290.2
Kamloops	Thompson-Nicola	October 17, 1967	9	97,902	90,280	8.4	297.93	328.6
Kelowna	Central Okanagan	May 4, 1905	9	144,576	127,390	13.5	211.85	682.4
Kimberley	East Kootenay	March 29, 1944	7	8,115	7,425	9.3	60.51	134.1
Langford	Capital	December 8, 1992	7	46,584	35,342	31.8	41.43	1124.4
Langley	Metro Vancouver	March 15, 1955	7	28,963	25,888	11.9	10.18	2845.2
Maple Ridge	Metro Vancouver	September 12, 2014	7	90,990	82,256	10.6	267.82	339.7
Merritt	Thompson-Nicola	April 1, 1911	7	7,051	7,139	-1.2	26.04	270.7
Mission	Fraser Valley	March 29, 2021	7	41,519	38,554	7.7	226.98	182.9
Nanaimo	Nanaimo	December 24, 1874	9	99,863	90,504	10.3	90.45	1104.1
Nelson	Central Kootenay	March 18, 1897	7	11,106	10,572	5.1	11.93	930.6
New Westminster	Metro Vancouver	July 16, 1860	7	78,916	70,996	11.2	15.62	5052.4
North Vancouver	Metro Vancouver	August 10, 1891	7	58,120	52,898	9.9	11.83	4913.0
Parksville	Nanaimo	June 19, 1945	7	13,642	12,453	9.5	14.52	939.5
Penticton	Okanagan-Similkameen	January 1, 1909	7	36,885	33,761	9.3	43.03	857.3
Pitt Meadows	Metro Vancouver	April 25, 1914	7	19,146	18,573	3.1	86.34	221.7
Port Alberni	Alberni-Clayoquot	October 28, 1967	7	18,259	17,678	3.3	19.66	928.9
Port Coquitlam	Metro Vancouver	March 7, 1913	7	61,498	58,612	4.9	29.16	2108.7
Port Moody	Metro Vancouver	March 11, 1913	7	33,535	33,551	0.0	25.85	1297.3
Powell River	Powell River	October 15, 1955	7	13,943	13,157	6.0	28.91	482.4
Prince George	Fraser-Fort George	March 6, 1915	9	76,708	74,003	3.7	316.74	242.2
Prince Rupert	North Coast	March 10, 1910	7	12,300	12,220	0.7	66.00	186.4
Quesnel	Cariboo	March 21, 1928	7	9,889	9,879	0.1	35.35	279.8
Revelstoke	Columbia Shuswap	March 1, 1899	7	8,275	7,562	9.4	41.28	200.5
Richmond	Metro Vancouver	November 10, 1879	9	209,937	198,309	5.9	128.87	1629.0
Rossland	Kootenay Boundary	March 18, 1897	7	4,140	3,729	11.0	59.72	69.3
Salmon Arm	Columbia Shuswap	May 15, 1905	7	19,432	17,706	9.7	155.19	125.2
Surrey	Metro Vancouver	November 10, 1879	9	568,322	517,887	9.7	316.11	1797.9
Terrace	Kitimat–Stikine	December 31, 1927	7	12,017	11,643	3.2	57.33	209.6
Trail	Kootenay Boundary	June 14, 1901	7	7,920	7,709	2.7	34.90	226.9
Vancouver (Note: Vancouver is Canada's eighth-largest city and British Columbia's largest city by population. The Vancouver CMA includes the cities of Burnaby, Coquitlam, Delta, Langley, Maple Ridge, New Westminster, North Vancouver, Pitt Meadows, Port Coquitlam, Port Moody, Richmond, Surrey, Vancouver and White Rock.)	Metro Vancouver	April 6, 1886	11	662,248	631,486	4.9	115.18	5749.9
Vernon	North Okanagan	December 30, 1892	7	44,519	40,116	11.0	96.43	461.7
Victoria (Note: Victoria is British Columbia's capital. The Victoria CMA includes the cities of Colwood, Langford and Victoria.)	Capital	August 2, 1862	9	91,867	85,792	7.1	19.45	4722.3
West Kelowna	Central Okanagan	June 26, 2015	7	36,078	32,655	10.5	122.09	295.5
White Rock	Metro Vancouver	April 15, 1957	7	21,939	19,952	10.0	5.17	4240.6
Williams Lake	Cariboo	March 15, 1929	7	10,947	10,753	1.8	33.12	330.5
Total cities	—	—		3,630,140	3,367,053	7.8	4497.15	807.2

=== Former cities ===
Former cities in British Columbia
Name	Held city status
Kaslo	1893–1959
Columbia	1899-1903
Phoenix	1900–1921
Sandon	1898–1920
Slocan	1901-1958

== See also ==
- List of communities in British Columbia
- List of municipalities in British Columbia
  - List of district municipalities in British Columbia
  - List of towns in British Columbia
  - List of villages in British Columbia
