= List of municipalities in British Columbia =

Location of British Columbia in Canada

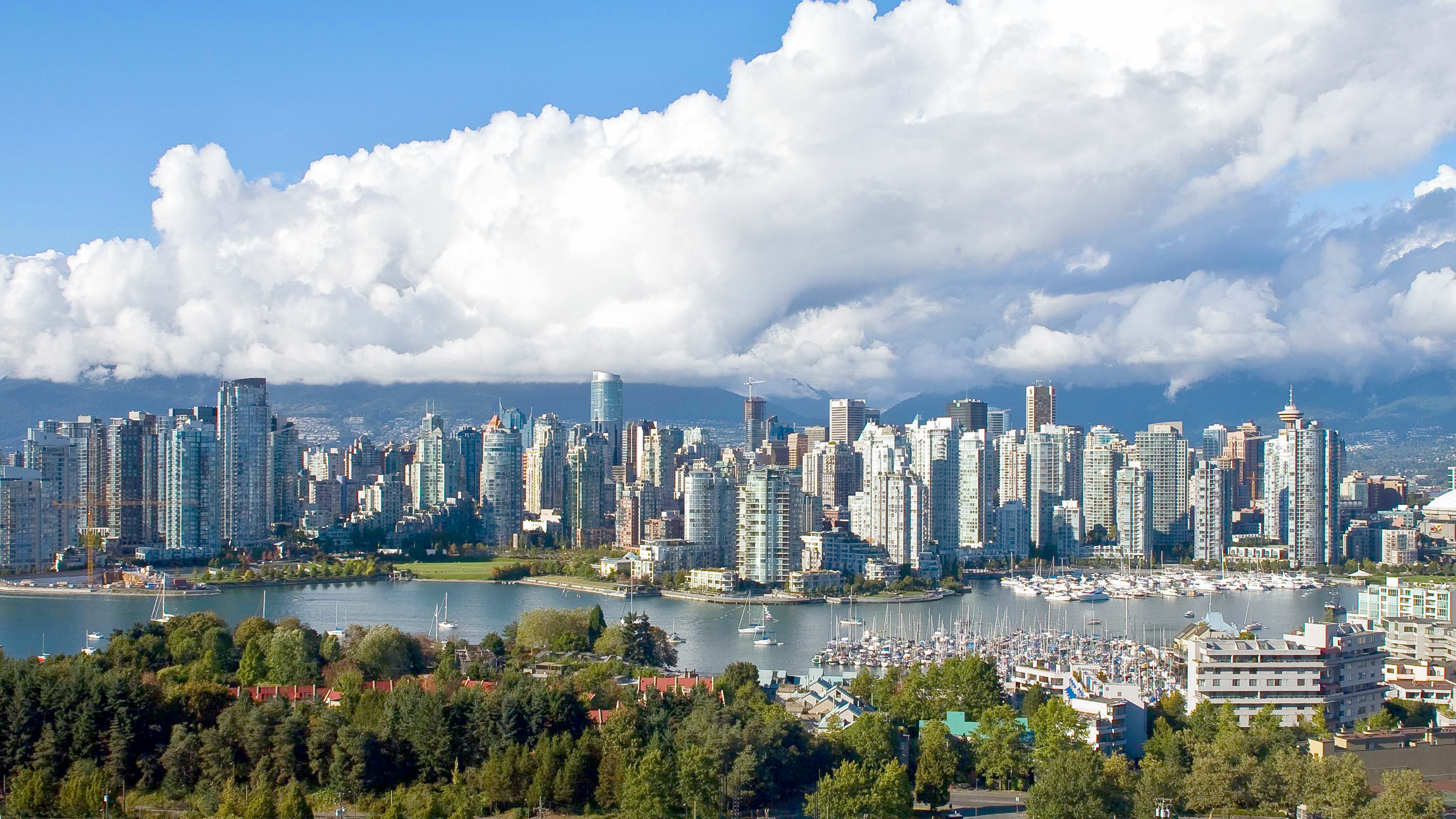
Skyline of Vancouver, British Columbia's largest city

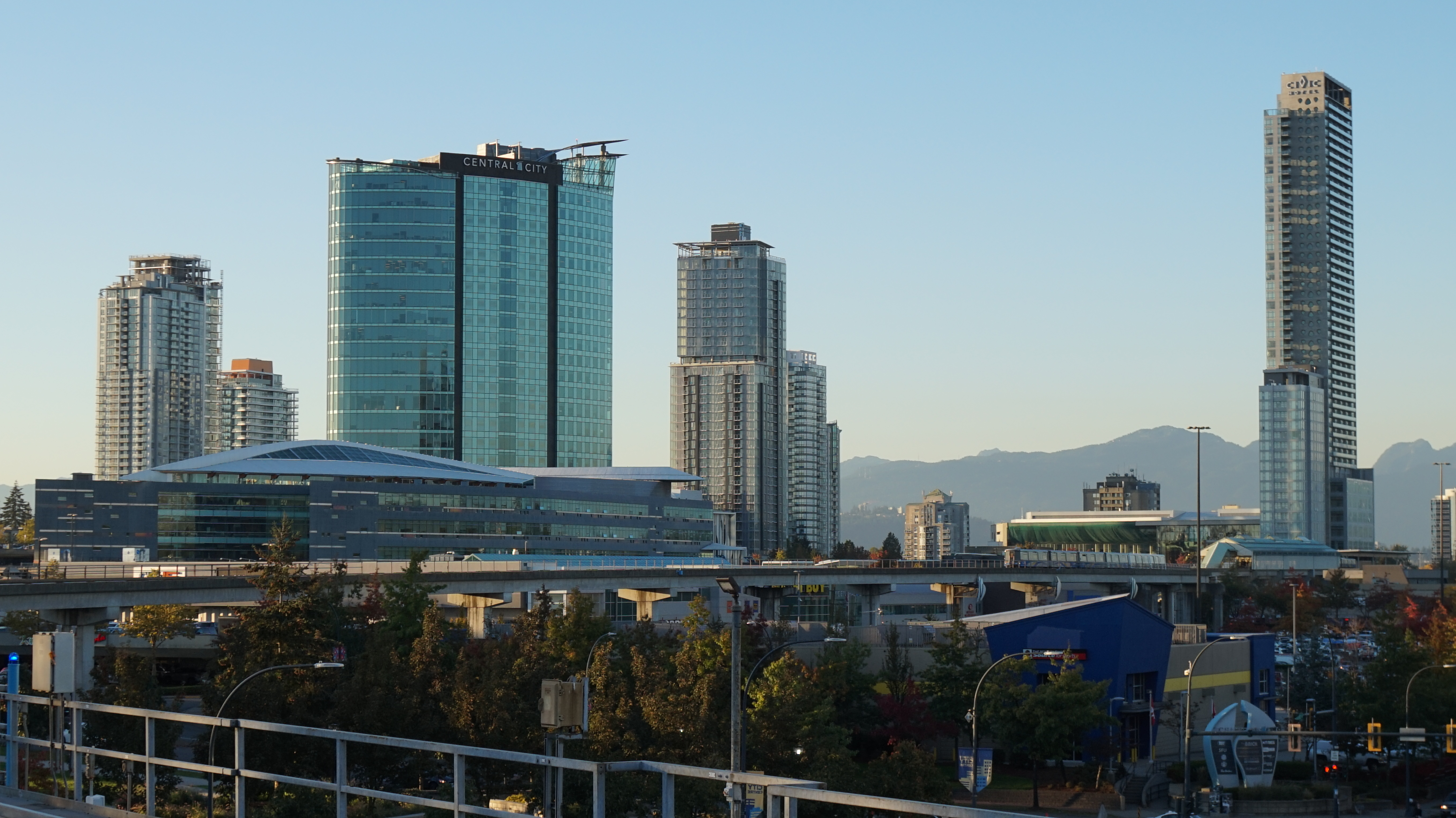
Skyline of Surrey, British Columbia's second largest city and suburb of Vancouver

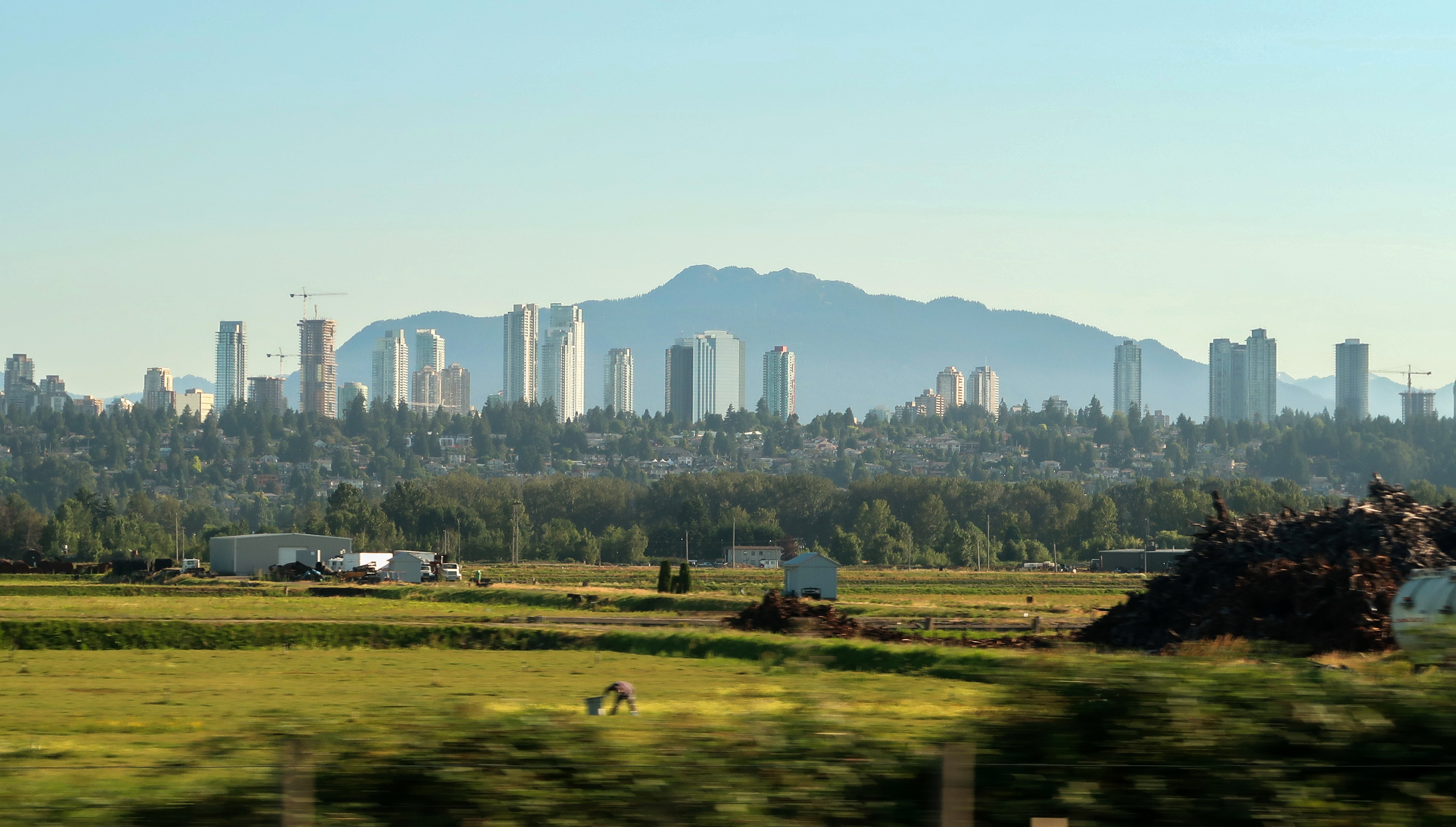
Skyline of Burnaby, British Columbia's third largest city and suburb of Vancouver

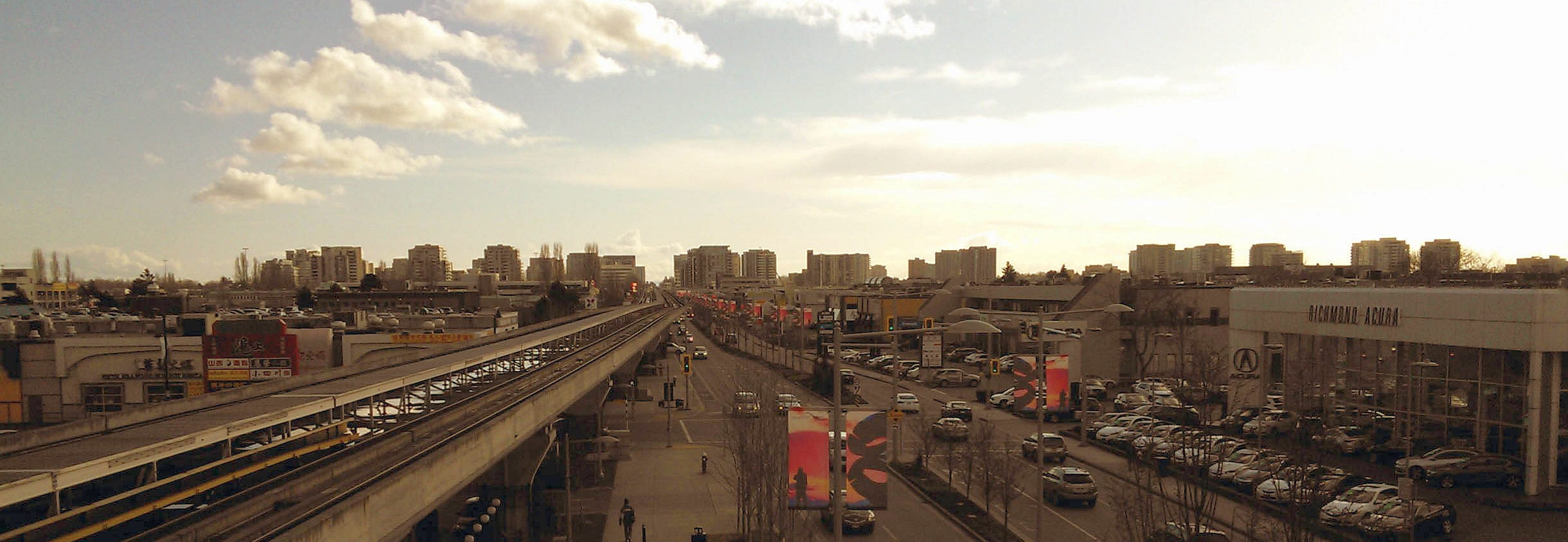
Skyline of Richmond, British Columbia's fourth largest city and suburb of Vancouver

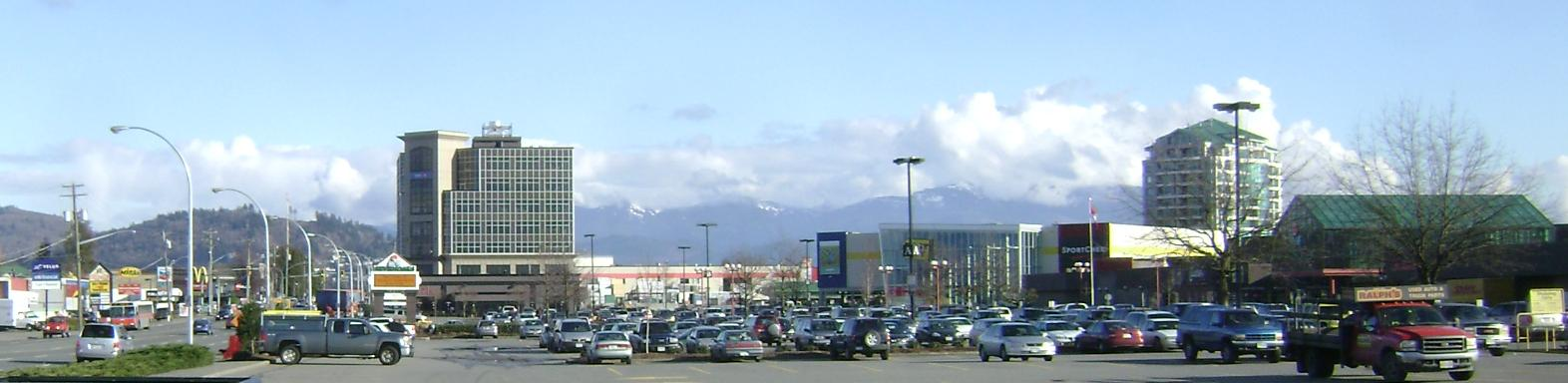
Skyline of Abbotsford, the largest city outside of Greater Vancouver

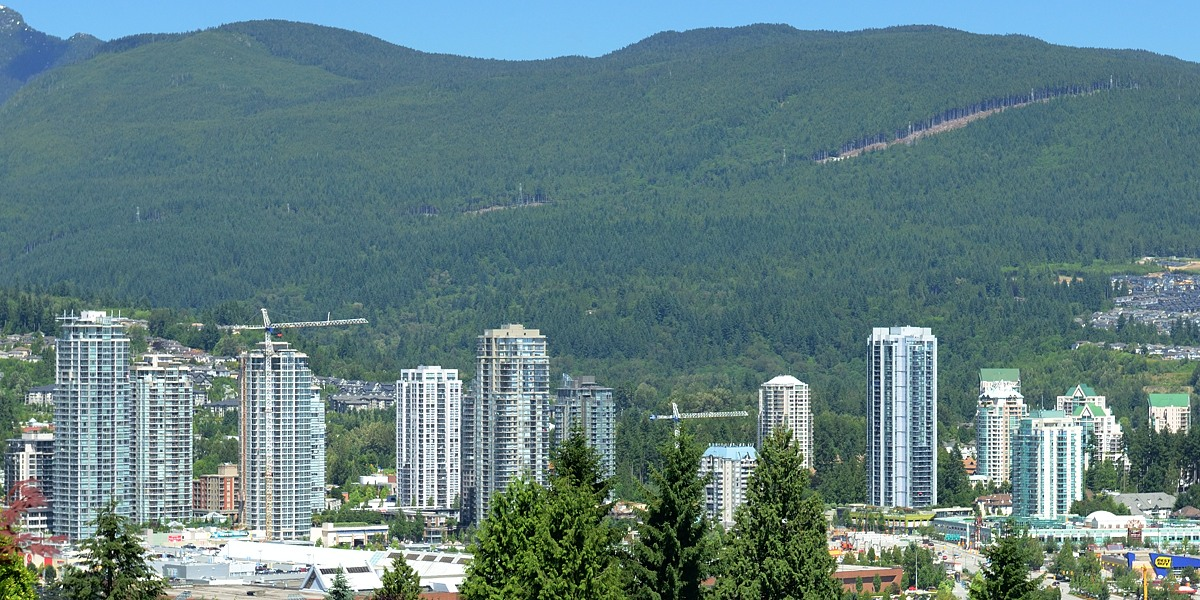
Skyline of Coquitlam, British Columbia's sixth largest city and suburb of Vancouver

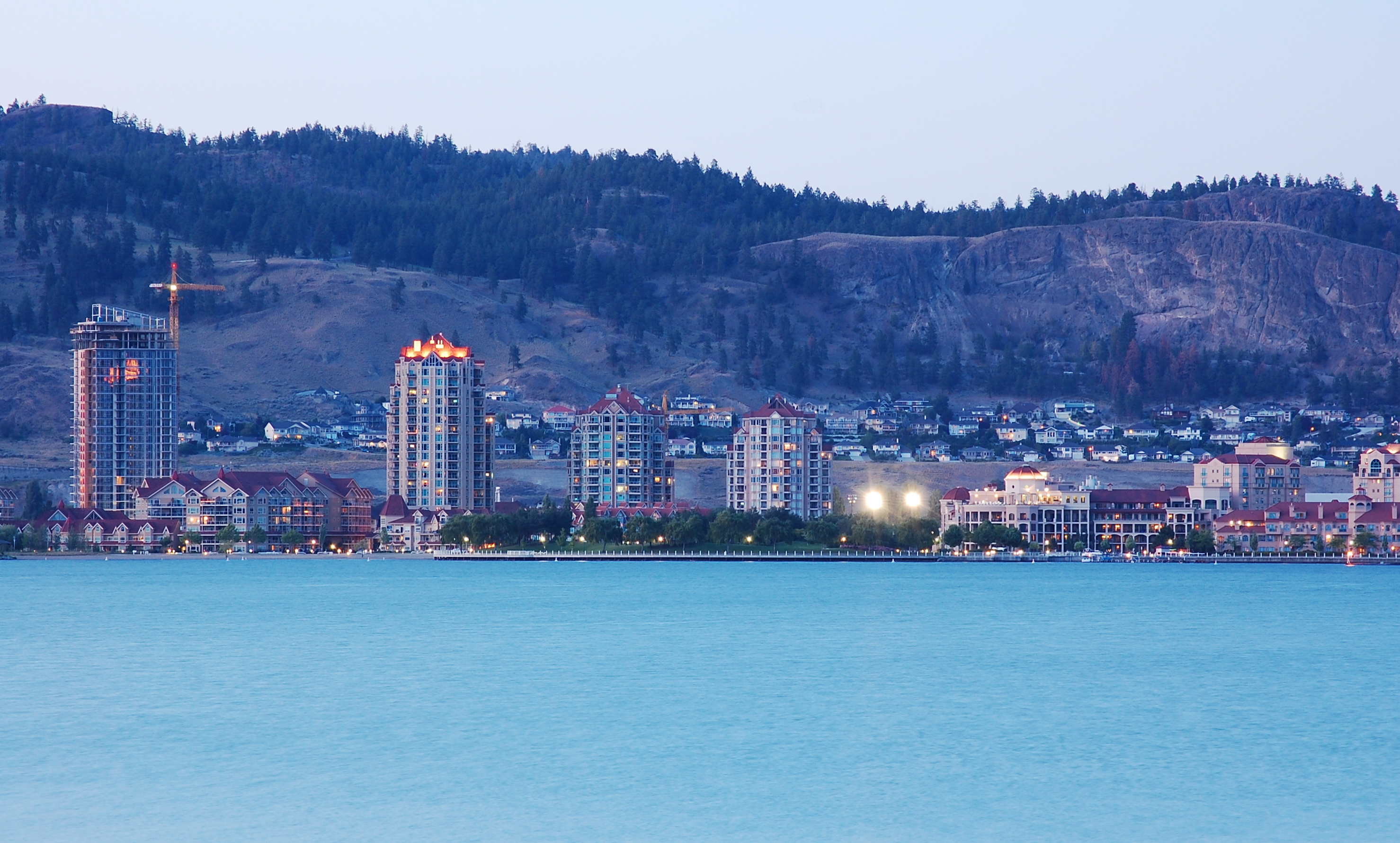
Skyline of Kelowna, the largest city in the interior of British Columbia

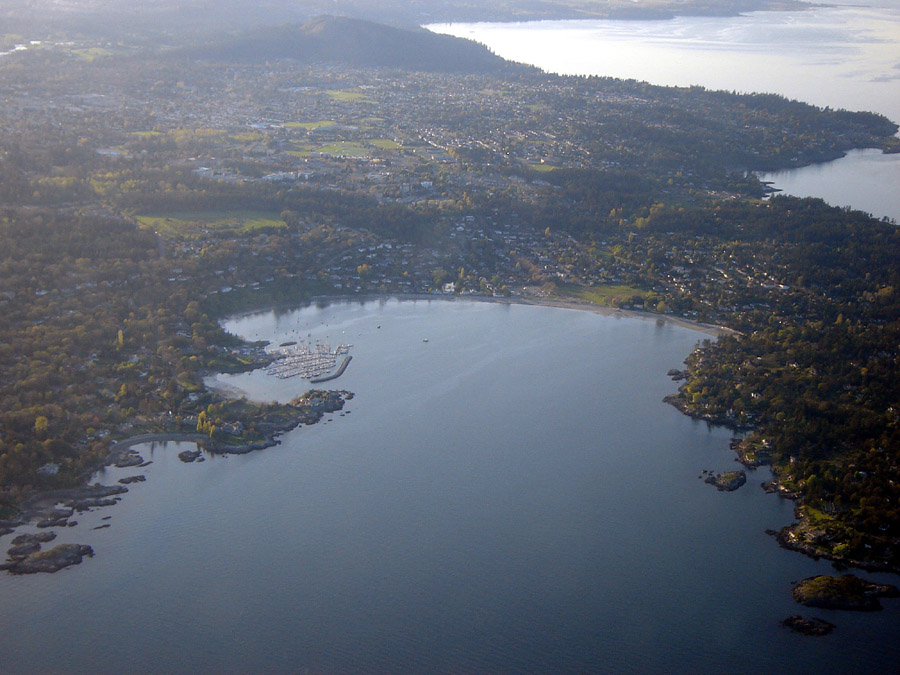
Aerial view of Saanich, the largest municipality on Vancouver Island and suburb of the capital city, Victoria

British Columbia is the third-most populous province in Canada, with 5,000,879 residents as of 2021, and is the second-largest in land area, (Note: Although British Columbia is the second-largest province in land area, it is third-largest in total area after accounting for freshwater area.) at 920,687 km^{2} (355,479 mi^{2}). British Columbia's 161 municipalities cover only 11 percent of the province's land mass yet are home to 89 percent of its population. A municipality is a local government incorporated by the province allowing a community to govern itself and to provide and regulate local services. These services typically include, but are not limited to, the provision of drinking water, sewers, roads, fire protection, street lights, garbage/recycling collection, land use planning, building inspection, and parks.

Within their limited jurisdictions, municipalities are autonomous, responsible and accountable to their citizens and to the province. Their powers and responsibilities are regulated through the Local Government Act, the Community Charter, and, in the case of Vancouver, the Vancouver Charter. They have the power of a natural person, the power to expropriate, and the power to establish and enforce bylaws. They are able to raise funds through property taxes and user fees, and borrow a limited amount through the Municipal Finance Authority of British Columbia to pay for capital costs.

Municipalities are governed by a mayor and council who are democratically elected every 4 years on the third Saturday in October. The most recent election took place on October 15, 2022; the next election will take place on October 17, 2026. Each municipality is a member of a regional district to which their councils elect representatives. The board of directors of the regional district is used as a forum to discuss regional issues.

To become a municipality, a community, with the assistance of the provincial Ministry of Community, Sport and Cultural Development, defines its borders and holds a referendum on the issue. If successful the Cabinet of British Columbia issues a letters patent incorporating the community. Part 2 of the Local Government Act sets out a classification scheme that gives each new municipality a designation. If the population is fewer than 2,500 people the new municipality is designated a village, if between 2,500 and 5,000 a town, and if greater than 5,000 a city. If the new municipality has an area greater than 800 hectares (2,000 acres) and an average population density of fewer than 5 persons per hectare then is it designated a district municipality. The municipality must request change in designation but is not compelled to do so, despite population growth or loss – Greenwood has retained its city status, for example, rather than relinquishing it as other boomtowns of its era have done. There is no longer any legal difference between the designations.

== Cities ==
A city is a classification of municipalities used in British Columbia. British Columbia's lieutenant governor may incorporate a community as a city by letters patent, on the recommendation of the Minister of Housing and Municipal Affairs, if its population is greater than 5,000 and the outcome of a vote involving affected residents was that greater than 50 percent voted in favour of the proposed incorporation.

British Columbia has 53 cities, which had a cumulative population of 3,630,140 in the 2021 census. British Columbia's largest and smallest cities are Vancouver and Greenwood with populations of 662,248 and 702 respectively. The fastest-growing city in British Columbia is Langford, which grew 31.8 percent between 2016 and 2021, while the fastest-shrinking is Merritt, which shrunk by 1.2 percent. The largest city by land area is Abbotsford, which spans 375.33 km^{2} (144.92 mi^{2}), while the smallest is Duncan, at 2.06 km^{2} (0.80 mi^{2}). The first community to incorporate as a city was New Westminster on July 16, 1860, while the most recent community to incorporate as a city was Mission on March 29, 2021. Victoria is the capital city of British Columbia.

== District municipalities ==
A district municipality is a classification of municipalities used in British Columbia. British Columbia's lieutenant governor may incorporate a community as a district municipality by letters patent, under the recommendation of the Minister of Housing and Municipal Affairs, if the area is greater than 800 ha (2,000 acres) and has a population density of fewer than 5 people per hectare, and the outcome of a vote involving affected residents was that greater than 50 percent voted in favour of the proposed incorporation.

British Columbia has 49 district municipalities that had a cumulative population of 669,454 in the 2021 Census. British Columbia's largest and smallest district municipalities are Langley and Wells with populations of 132,603 and 218 respectively. The fastest-growing district municipality in British Columbia is Stewart, which grew 28.9 percent between 2016 and 2021, while the fastest-shrinking is the Northern Rockies Regional Municipality, which declined by 18.8 percent.

Of British Columbia's current 49 district municipalities, the first to incorporate as a district municipality was North Cowichan on June 18, 1873, while the most recent community to incorporate as a district municipality was the Northern Rockies Regional Municipality (NRRM) on February 6, 2009. Although portrayed as a regional municipality in its official name, the NRRM is actually classified as a district municipality.

== Indian government districts ==
The lone Indian government district designation was created by the federal shíshálh Nation Self-Government Act and provincial Sechelt Indian Government District Enabling Act and granted to the shíshálh Nation Government District (formerly known as the Sechelt Indian Government District), which governs the shíshálh Nation lands consisting of 33 former Indian reserves.

== Island municipalities ==
If the community wishing to incorporate is located within a trust area under the Island Trust Act, it must incorporate as an island municipality. A single island municipality designation has been granted to Bowen Island.

== Mountain resort municipalities ==
A mountain resort municipality designation is granted by the Minister of Housing and Municipal Affairs through the Local Government Act if there exists alpine ski lift operations, year-round recreational facilities, and commercial overnight accommodations. British Columbia's lone mountain resort municipality is Sun Peaks.

== Resort municipalities ==
A single resort municipality designation has been granted to Whistler by the Resort Municipality of Whistler Act.

== Towns ==
A town is a classification of municipalities used in British Columbia. British Columbia's lieutenant governor may incorporate a community as a town by letters patent, under the recommendation of the Minister of Communities, Sport and Cultural Development, if its population is greater than 2,500 but not greater than 5,000 and the outcome of a vote involving affected residents was that greater than 50 percent voted in favour of the proposed incorporation.

British Columbia has 14 towns that had a cumulative population of 95,922 in the 2021 census. British Columbia's largest and smallest towns are Comox and Port McNeill with populations of 14,806 and 2,356 respectively. View Royal and Smithers are the fastest-growing and fastest-shrinking towns in the province, growing by 11.2 percent and shrinking by 0.4 percent respectively between 2016 and 2021. Of British Columbia's current 14 towns, the first to incorporate was Ladysmith on June 3, 1904, (Note: Although Ladysmith originally incorporated as a city, it reincorporated as a village on January 1, 1958, and then reincorporated as a town on January 1, 1965.) while the most recent community to incorporate as a town was View Royal on December 5, 1988.

== Villages ==
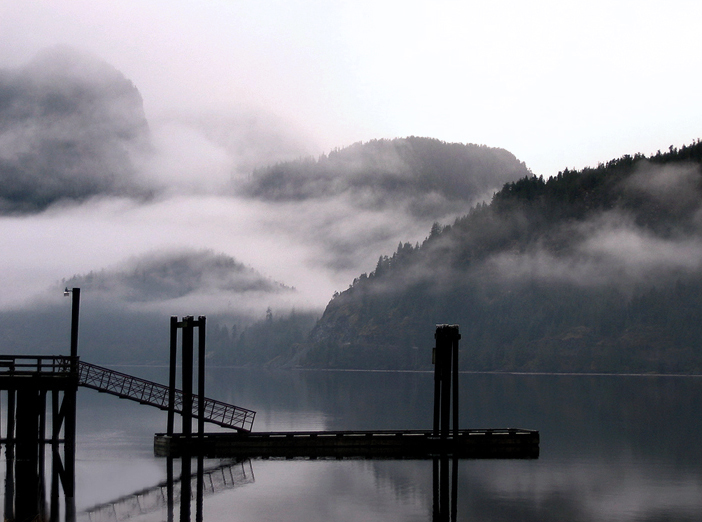
Shoreline of Zeballos, British Columbia's smallest municipality

A village is a classification of municipalities used in British Columbia. British Columbia's lieutenant governor may incorporate a community as a village by letters patent, on the recommendation of the Minister of Communities, Sport and Cultural Development, if its population is not greater than 2,500 and the outcome of a vote involving affected residents was that greater than 50 percent voted in favour of the proposed incorporation.

British Columbia has 42 villages that had a cumulative population of 48,511 in the 2021 census. British Columbia's largest and smallest villages are Cumberland and Zeballos with populations of 4,447 and 126 respectively. Radium Hot Springs and Silverton are the fastest-growing and fastest-shrinking villages in the province, growing by 72.6 percent and shrinking by 23.6 percent respectively between 2016 and 2021. Of British Columbia's current 42 villages, the first to incorporate was Kaslo on August 14, 1893, (Note: Although Kaslo originally incorporated as a city, it reincorporated as a village on January 1, 1959.) while the most recent community to incorporate as a village was Queen Charlotte (now known as Daajing Giids) on December 5, 2005.

== List of municipalities ==
List of municipalities in British Columbia
Name	Status	Regional district	Incorporation date	2021 Canadian census				
Name	Status	Regional district	Incorporation date	Population (2021)	Population (2016)	Change	Land area (km^{2})	Population density (/km^{2})
Abbotsford	City	Fraser Valley	December 12, 1995	153,524	141,397	+8.6%	375.33	409.0
Armstrong	City	North Okanagan	March 31, 1913	5,323	5,114	+4.1%	5.22	1,019.7
Burnaby	City	Metro Vancouver	September 22, 1892	249,125	232,755	+7.0%	90.57	2,750.6
Campbell River	City	Strathcona	June 24, 1947	35,519	33,007	+7.6%	144.38	246.0
Castlegar	City	Central Kootenay	January 1, 1974	8,338	8,039	+3.7%	19.87	419.6
Chilliwack	City	Fraser Valley	April 26, 1873	93,203	83,788	+11.2%	261.34	356.6
Colwood	City	Capital	June 24, 1985	18,961	16,859	+12.5%	17.66	1,073.7
Coquitlam	City	Metro Vancouver	July 25, 1891	148,625	139,284	+6.7%	122.15	1,216.7
Courtenay	City	Comox Valley	January 1, 1915	28,420	25,639	+10.8%	32.42	876.6
Cranbrook	City	East Kootenay	November 1, 1905	20,499	20,047	+2.3%	31.97	641.2
Dawson Creek	City	Peace River	May 26, 1936	12,323	12,178	+1.2%	26.72	461.2
Delta	City	Metro Vancouver	November 10, 1879	108,455	102,238	+6.1%	179.66	603.7
Duncan	City	Cowichan Valley	March 4, 1912	5,047	4,944	+2.1%	2.06	2,450.0
Enderby	City	North Okanagan	March 1, 1905	3,028	2,964	+2.2%	4.26	710.8
Fernie	City	East Kootenay	July 28, 1904	6,320	5,396	+17.1%	15.11	418.3
Fort St. John	City	Peace River	December 31, 1947	21,465	20,260	+5.9%	32.67	657.0
Grand Forks	City	Kootenay Boundary	April 15, 1897	4,112	4,049	+1.6%	10.37	396.5
Greenwood	City	Kootenay Boundary	July 12, 1897	702	665	+5.6%	2.42	290.1
Kamloops	City	Thompson-Nicola	October 17, 1967	97,902	90,280	+8.4%	297.93	328.6
Kelowna	City	Central Okanagan	May 4, 1905	144,576	127,390	+13.5%	211.85	682.4
Kimberley	City	East Kootenay	March 29, 1944	8,115	7,425	+9.3%	60.51	134.1
Langford	City	Capital	December 8, 1992	46,584	35,342	+31.8%	41.43	1,124.4
Langley	City	Metro Vancouver	March 15, 1955	28,963	25,888	+11.9%	10.18	2,845.1
Maple Ridge	City	Metro Vancouver	September 12, 2014	90,990	82,256	+10.6%	267.82	339.7
Merritt	City	Thompson-Nicola	April 1, 1911	7,051	7,139	−1.2%	26.04	270.8
Mission	City	Fraser Valley	March 29, 2021	41,519	38,554	+7.7%	226.98	182.9
Nanaimo	City	Nanaimo	December 24, 1874	99,863	90,504	+10.3%	90.45	1,104.1
Nelson	City	Central Kootenay	March 18, 1897	11,106	10,572	+5.1%	11.93	930.9
New Westminster	City	Metro Vancouver	July 16, 1860	78,916	70,996	+11.2%	15.62	5,052.2
North Vancouver	City	Metro Vancouver	August 10, 1891	58,120	52,898	+9.9%	11.83	4,912.9
Parksville	City	Nanaimo	June 19, 1945	13,642	12,453	+9.5%	14.52	939.5
Penticton	City	Okanagan-Similkameen	January 1, 1909	36,885	33,761	+9.3%	43.03	857.2
Pitt Meadows	City	Metro Vancouver	April 25, 1914	19,146	18,573	+3.1%	86.34	221.8
Port Alberni	City	Alberni-Clayoquot	October 28, 1967	18,259	17,678	+3.3%	19.66	928.7
Port Coquitlam	City	Metro Vancouver	March 7, 1913	61,498	58,612	+4.9%	29.16	2,109.0
Port Moody	City	Metro Vancouver	March 11, 1913	33,535	33,551	0.0%	25.85	1,297.3
Powell River	City	qathet	October 15, 1955	13,943	13,157	+6.0%	28.91	482.3
Prince George	City	Fraser-Fort George	March 6, 1915	76,708	74,003	+3.7%	316.74	242.2
Prince Rupert	City	North Coast	March 10, 1910	12,300	12,220	+0.7%	66.00	186.4
Quesnel	City	Cariboo	March 21, 1928	9,889	9,879	+0.1%	35.35	279.7
Revelstoke	City	Columbia Shuswap	March 1, 1899	8,275	7,562	+9.4%	41.28	200.5
Richmond	City	Metro Vancouver	November 10, 1879	209,937	198,309	+5.9%	128.87	1,629.1
Rossland	City	Kootenay Boundary	March 18, 1897	4,140	3,729	+11.0%	59.72	69.3
Salmon Arm	City	Columbia Shuswap	May 15, 1905	19,432	17,706	+9.7%	155.19	125.2
Surrey	City	Metro Vancouver	November 10, 1879	568,322	517,887	+9.7%	316.11	1,797.9
Terrace	City	Kitimat-Stikine	December 31, 1927	12,017	11,643	+3.2%	57.33	209.6
Trail	City	Kootenay Boundary	June 14, 1901	7,920	7,709	+2.7%	34.90	226.9
Vancouver	City	Metro Vancouver	April 6, 1886	662,248	631,486	+4.9%	115.18	5,749.7
Vernon	City	North Okanagan	December 30, 1892	44,519	40,116	+11.0%	96.43	461.7
Victoria	City	Capital	August 2, 1862	91,867	85,792	+7.1%	19.45	4,723.2
West Kelowna	City	Central Okanagan	June 26, 2015	36,078	32,655	+10.5%	122.09	295.5
White Rock	City	Metro Vancouver	April 15, 1957	21,939	19,952	+10.0%	5.17	4,243.5
Williams Lake	City	Cariboo	March 15, 1929	10,947	10,753	+1.8%	33.12	330.5
100 Mile House	District municipality	Cariboo	July 27, 1965	1,928	1,918	+0.5%	53.01	36.4
Barriere	District municipality	Thompson-Nicola	December 4, 2007	1,765	1,713	+3.0%	10.73	164.5
Central Saanich	District municipality	Capital	December 12, 1950	17,385	16,814	+3.4%	41.20	422.0
Chetwynd	District municipality	Peace River	September 25, 1962	2,302	2,503	−8.0%	63.55	36.2
Clearwater	District municipality	Thompson-Nicola	December 3, 2007	2,388	2,324	+2.8%	55.65	42.9
Coldstream	District municipality	North Okanagan	December 21, 1906	11,171	10,648	+4.9%	66.57	167.8
Elkford	District municipality	East Kootenay	July 16, 1971	2,749	2,499	+10.0%	108.12	25.4
Esquimalt	District municipality	Capital	September 1, 1912	17,533	17,655	−0.7%	7.08	2,476.4
Fort St. James	District municipality	Bulkley-Nechako	December 19, 1952	1,386	1,598	−13.3%	23.45	59.1
Highlands	District municipality	Capital	December 7, 1993	2,482	2,225	+11.6%	38.01	65.3
Hope	District municipality	Fraser Valley	April 6, 1929	6,686	6,181	+8.2%	40.87	163.6
Houston	District municipality	Bulkley-Nechako	March 4, 1957	3,052	2,993	+2.0%	72.88	41.9
Hudson's Hope	District municipality	Peace River	November 16, 1965	841	1,015	−17.1%	826.70	1.0
Invermere	District municipality	East Kootenay	May 22, 1951	3,917	3,391	+15.5%	10.75	364.4
Kent	District municipality	Fraser Valley	January 1, 1895	6,300	6,067	+3.8%	168.59	37.4
Kitimat	District municipality	Kitimat-Stikine	March 31, 1953	8,236	8,131	+1.3%	239.28	34.4
Lake Country	District municipality	Central Okanagan	May 2, 1995	15,817	12,922	+22.4%	122.16	129.5
Langley	District municipality	Metro Vancouver	April 26, 1873	132,603	117,285	+13.1%	307.22	431.6
Lantzville	District municipality	Nanaimo	June 25, 2003	3,817	3,605	+5.9%	27.68	137.9
Lillooet	District municipality	Squamish-Lillooet	December 31, 1946	2,302	2,275	+1.2%	27.63	83.3
Logan Lake	District municipality	Thompson-Nicola	November 10, 1970	2,255	1,993	+13.1%	324.28	7.0
Mackenzie	District municipality	Fraser-Fort George	May 19, 1966	3,281	3,714	−11.7%	154.19	21.3
Metchosin	District municipality	Capital	December 3, 1984	5,067	4,708	+7.6%	69.57	72.8
New Hazelton	District municipality	Kitimat-Stikine	December 15, 1980	602	580	+3.8%	24.34	24.7
North Cowichan	District municipality	Cowichan Valley	June 18, 1873	31,990	29,696	+7.7%	195.41	163.7
North Saanich	District municipality	Capital	August 19, 1965	12,235	11,249	+8.8%	37.16	329.3
North Vancouver	District municipality	Metro Vancouver	May 13, 1907	88,168	85,649	+2.9%	160.66	548.8
Northern Rockies	District municipality	Northern Rockies	February 6, 2009	3,947	4,862	−18.8%	84,759.31	0.0
Oak Bay	District municipality	Capital	July 2, 1906	17,990	18,094	−0.6%	10.52	1,710.1
Peachland	District municipality	Central Okanagan	January 1, 1909	5,789	5,428	+6.7%	16.10	359.6
Port Edward	District municipality	North Coast	June 29, 1966	470	467	+0.6%	167.16	2.8
Port Hardy	District municipality	Mount Waddington	May 5, 1966	3,902	4,132	−5.6%	38.55	101.2
Saanich	District municipality	Capital	March 1, 1906	117,735	114,148	+3.1%	103.59	1,136.5
Sechelt	District municipality	Sunshine Coast	February 15, 1956	10,847	10,216	+6.2%	39.02	278.0
Sicamous	District municipality	Columbia Shuswap	December 4, 1989	2,613	2,429	+7.6%	12.80	204.1
Sooke	District municipality	Capital	December 7, 1999	15,086	13,001	+16.0%	56.60	266.5
Spallumcheen	District municipality	North Okanagan	July 21, 1892	5,307	5,106	+3.9%	254.92	20.8
Sparwood	District municipality	East Kootenay	October 6, 1964	4,148	3,784	+9.6%	191.30	21.7
Squamish	District municipality	Squamish-Lillooet	May 18, 1948	23,819	19,497	+22.2%	104.71	227.5
Stewart	District municipality	Kitimat-Stikine	May 16, 1930	517	401	+28.9%	551.57	0.9
Summerland	District municipality	Okanagan-Similkameen	December 21, 1906	12,042	11,615	+3.7%	74.04	162.6
Taylor	District municipality	Peace River	August 23, 1958	1,317	1,469	−10.3%	16.92	77.8
Tofino	District municipality	Alberni-Clayoquot	February 5, 1932	2,516	1,967	+27.9%	10.56	238.3
Tumbler Ridge	District municipality	Peace River	April 9, 1981	2,399	1,987	+20.7%	1,557.41	1.5
Ucluelet	District municipality	Alberni-Clayoquot	February 26, 1952	2,066	1,717	+20.3%	6.48	318.8
Vanderhoof	District municipality	Bulkley-Nechako	January 22, 1926	4,346	4,434	−2.0%	53.93	80.6
Wells	District municipality	Cariboo	June 29, 1998	218	217	+0.5%	158.09	1.4
West Vancouver	District municipality	Metro Vancouver	March 15, 1912	44,122	42,473	+3.9%	87.18	506.1
shíshálh Nation	First Nations government district	qathet and Sunshine Coast	March 17, 1988	765	697	+9.8%	11.03	69.4
Bowen Island	Island municipality	Metro Vancouver	December 4, 1999	4,256	3,680	+15.7%	50.12	84.9
Sun Peaks Mountain	Mountain resort municipality	Thompson-Nicola	June 3, 2010	1,404	616	+127.9%	40.85	34.4
Whistler	Resort municipality	Squamish-Lillooet	September 6, 1975	13,982	11,746	+19.0%	240.00	58.3
Comox	Town	Comox Valley	January 14, 1946	14,806	14,028	+5.5%	16.87	877.7
Creston	Town	Central Kootenay	May 14, 1924	5,583	5,361	+4.1%	8.41	663.9
Gibsons	Town	Sunshine Coast	March 4, 1929	4,758	4,605	+3.3%	4.31	1,103.9
Golden	Town	Columbia Shuswap	June 26, 1957	3,986	3,708	+7.5%	11.33	351.8
Ladysmith	Town	Cowichan Valley	June 3, 1904	8,990	8,537	+5.3%	12.04	746.7
Lake Cowichan	Town	Cowichan Valley	August 19, 1944	3,325	3,226	+3.1%	8.24	403.5
Oliver	Town	Okanagan-Similkameen	December 31, 1945	5,094	4,928	+3.4%	5.49	927.9
Osoyoos	Town	Okanagan-Similkameen	January 14, 1946	5,556	5,050	+10.0%	8.41	660.6
Port McNeill	Town	Mount Waddington	February 18, 1966	2,356	2,337	+0.8%	13.77	171.1
Princeton	Town	Okanagan-Similkameen	September 11, 1951	2,894	2,828	+2.3%	59.28	48.8
Qualicum Beach	Town	Nanaimo	May 5, 1942	9,303	8,943	+4.0%	17.98	517.4
Sidney	Town	Capital	September 30, 1952	12,318	11,672	+5.5%	5.11	2,410.6
Smithers	Town	Bulkley-Nechako	October 6, 1921	5,378	5,401	−0.4%	15.26	352.4
View Royal	Town	Capital	December 5, 1988	11,575	10,408	+11.2%	14.33	807.7
Alert Bay	Village	Mount Waddington	January 14, 1946	449	479	−6.3%	1.69	265.7
Anmore	Village	Metro Vancouver	December 7, 1987	2,356	2,210	+6.6%	27.53	85.6
Ashcroft	Village	Thompson-Nicola	June 27, 1952	1,670	1,558	+7.2%	50.86	32.8
Belcarra	Village	Metro Vancouver	August 22, 1979	687	643	+6.8%	5.50	124.9
Burns Lake	Village	Bulkley-Nechako	December 6, 1923	1,659	1,779	−6.7%	6.54	253.7
Cache Creek	Village	Thompson-Nicola	November 28, 1967	969	963	+0.6%	10.40	93.2
Canal Flats	Village	East Kootenay	June 29, 2004	802	668	+20.1%	11.07	72.4
Chase	Village	Thompson-Nicola	April 22, 1969	2,399	2,286	+4.9%	3.75	639.7
Clinton	Village	Thompson-Nicola	July 16, 1963	568	641	−11.4%	8.14	69.8
Cumberland	Village	Comox Valley	January 1, 1898	4,447	3,753	+18.5%	29.04	153.1
Daajing Giids (Note: Daajing Giids was formerly known as Queen Charlotte prior to July 13, 2022.)	Village	North Coast	December 5, 2005	964	884	+9.0%	35.58	27.1
Fraser Lake	Village	Bulkley-Nechako	September 27, 1966	965	988	−2.3%	4.06	237.7
Fruitvale	Village	Kootenay Boundary	November 4, 1952	1,958	1,920	+2.0%	2.70	725.2
Gold River	Village	Strathcona	August 26, 1965	1,246	1,212	+2.8%	10.92	114.1
Granisle	Village	Bulkley-Nechako	June 29, 1971	337	303	+11.2%	39.85	8.5
Harrison Hot Springs	Village	Fraser Valley	May 27, 1949	1,905	1,468	+29.8%	5.49	347.0
Hazelton	Village	Kitimat-Stikine	February 15, 1956	257	313	−17.9%	2.89	88.9
Kaslo	Village	Central Kootenay	August 14, 1893	1,049	968	+8.4%	3.01	348.5
Keremeos	Village	Okanagan-Similkameen	October 30, 1956	1,608	1,502	+7.1%	2.09	769.4
Lions Bay	Village	Metro Vancouver	December 17, 1970	1,390	1,334	+4.2%	2.53	549.4
Lumby	Village	North Okanagan	December 20, 1955	2,063	1,833	+12.5%	5.93	347.9
Lytton	Village	Thompson-Nicola	May 3, 1945	210	249	−15.7%	6.73	31.2
Masset	Village	North Coast	May 11, 1961	838	793	+5.7%	20.69	40.5
McBride	Village	Fraser-Fort George	April 7, 1932	588	616	−4.5%	4.62	127.3
Midway	Village	Kootenay Boundary	May 25, 1967	651	649	+0.3%	12.23	53.2
Montrose	Village	Kootenay Boundary	June 22, 1956	1,013	996	+1.7%	1.46	693.8
Nakusp	Village	Central Kootenay	November 24, 1964	1,589	1,605	−1.0%	8.04	197.6
New Denver	Village	Central Kootenay	January 12, 1929	487	473	+3.0%	0.87	559.8
Pemberton	Village	Squamish-Lillooet	July 20, 1956	3,407	2,574	+32.4%	61.36	55.5
Port Alice	Village	Mount Waddington	June 16, 1965	739	664	+11.3%	7.03	105.1
Port Clements	Village	North Coast	December 31, 1975	340	282	+20.6%	13.07	26.0
Pouce Coupe	Village	Peace River	January 6, 1932	762	792	−3.8%	2.06	369.9
Radium Hot Springs	Village	East Kootenay	December 10, 1990	1,339	776	+72.6%	6.34	211.2
Salmo	Village	Central Kootenay	October 30, 1946	1,140	1,141	−0.1%	2.44	467.2
Sayward	Village	Strathcona	June 27, 1968	334	311	+7.4%	4.44	75.2
Silverton	Village	Central Kootenay	May 6, 1930	181	195	−7.2%	0.35	425.7
Slocan	Village	Central Kootenay	June 1, 1901	379	289	+31.1%	0.78	485.9
Tahsis	Village	Strathcona	June 17, 1970	393	248	+58.5%	5.26	74.7
Telkwa	Village	Bulkley-Nechako	July 18, 1952	1,474	1,327	+11.1%	7.04	209.4
Valemount	Village	Fraser-Fort George	December 13, 1962	1,052	1,021	+3.0%	5.16	203.9
Warfield	Village	Kootenay Boundary	December 8, 1952	1,753	1,680	+4.3%	1.89	927.5
Zeballos	Village	Strathcona	June 27, 1952	126	107	+17.8%	1.55	81.3
Sub-total cities				3,630,140	3,367,053	+7.8%	4,497.15	807.2
Sub-total district municipalities				669,454	628,795	+6.5%	91,547.50	7.3
Sub-total Indian government districts				765	697	+9.8%	11.03	69.4
Sub-total island municipalities				4,256	3,680	+15.7%	50.12	84.9
Sub-total mountain resort municipalities				1,404	616	+127.9%	40.85	34.4
Sub-total resort municipalities				13,982	11,746	+19.0%	240.00	58.3
Sub-total towns				95,922	91,032	+5.4%	200.83	477.6
Sub-total villages				48,511	44,493	+9.0%	442.98	109.5
Total municipalities				4,464,434	4,148,112	+7.6%	97,030.46	46.0
British Columbia				5,000,879	4,648,055	+7.6%	920,686.55	5.4

== Former municipalities ==
Communities in British Columbia that once held their own municipal status include Aennofield, Alberni, Brocklehurst, Chapman Camp, Columbia, Cranberry Lake, Dewdney, Dufferin, Fort Nelson, Fraser Mills, Glenmore, Guisachan, Kinnaird, Marysville, Matsqui, Mission City, Natal, Nicomen Island, North Kamloops, Phoenix, Point Grey, Sandon, South Fort George, South Vancouver, Sumas, Tadanac, Valleyview and Westview. The majority of these former municipalities ceased to exist as a result of amalgamation with or annexation by another municipality. Others, such as Phoenix and Sandon, were dissolved from their municipal status as a result of population decline, while Dewdney dissolved due to financial reasons. The Jumbo Glacier Mountain Resort Municipality was dissolved in 2021.

== See also ==
- List of designated places in British Columbia
- List of Haida villages
- List of population centres in British Columbia
