= Okanagan Mission =

Neighbourhood in Kelowna, British Columbia, Canada

Coordinates: 49.8498°N 119.4677°W

Father Pandosy Mission, also known as the Okanagan Mission, was the original home for Father Pandosy in Kelowna, British Columbia. He moved to Kelowna in 1859 and started the first settlement of Europeans in that region. One of the first Europeans to join him at Kelowna was Eli Lequime.

The Pandosy Mission has been restored as a museum. It is owned by the Catholic Church and is jointly administered by the Okanagan Historical Society.

The area of the mission has been known as Okanagan Mission since, and is a neighbourhood of modern Kelowna.
