= Eli Lequime =

Eli Lequime (1811–1898) was born in France and began traveling the world in 1825 at the age of fourteen. He arrived in San Francisco in 1852 for the gold rush but soon gave up. Eli returned to France and fought in the Crimean War. He returned to San Francisco by 1856 and with his new wife, Marie Louise (née Altabagoethe) he caught a boat to Victoria, British Columbia. From there, the family caught a boat to the mainland. he had two children, Bernard and Gaston. The family panned for gold at Rock Creek which is west of Osoyoos. During Eli's time at Rock Creek, his son Gaston fell into a miner's sluice box and drowned at two years of age. Eli, Marie Louise and Bernard headed for the Cariboo with the hopes of striking it rich. On their way, Marie Louise gave birth to another son, who they named Gaston. Father Pandosy met the family on the trail and convinced them to come to Okanagan Mission with him. In 1861, Eli registered a land claim northeast of the Mission. Eli built a log home and a trading post on his new property. His store soon became the social and business hub of the area. Eli and Marie Louise had two more children at the Mission, Aminade (1866) and Leon (1870). The Lequime family had over 1,300 heads of cattle and had more than two thousand acres of land. Eli lived in the Mission Valley for twenty-seven years. When he was seventy, Eli decided to move back to San Francisco. By 1888 Eli was in San Francisco with his daughter, Aminade and his niece, Dorothy. Marie Louise would join him a couple years later. In 1905, Eli Lequime's homestead was added to the K.L.O. company for $12,000.00.
