= Myra-Bellevue Provincial Park =

Park in British Columbia

- IUCN category II (national park)
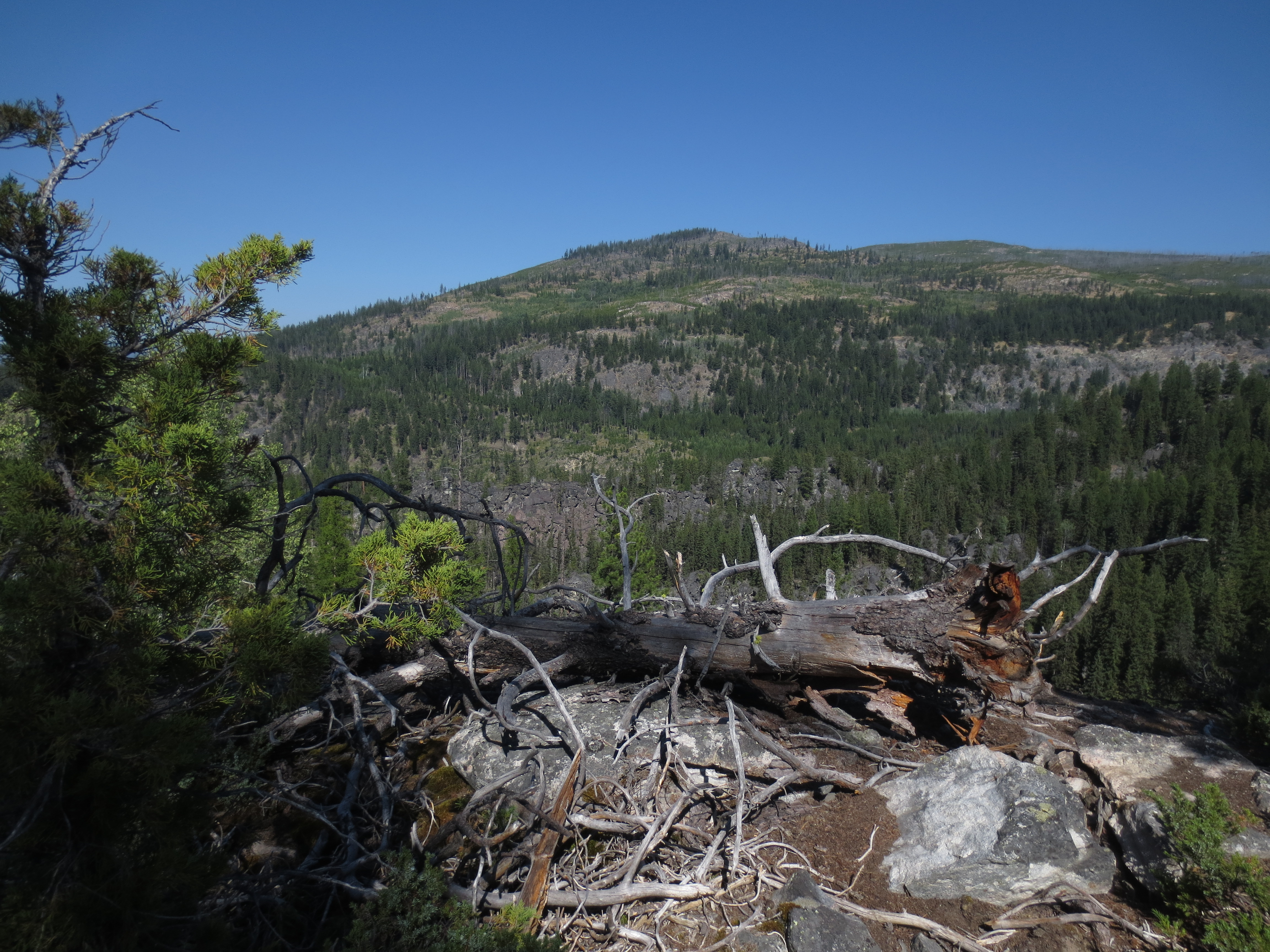
- Bellevue Canyon as seen from the Boulderfields

- Location within British Columbia Location within Regional District of Central Okanagan
- Interactive map of Myra-Bellevue Provincial Park
- Location: Central Okanagan, British Columbia, Canada
- Nearest city: Kelowna
- Coordinates: 49°47′10″N 119°23′15″W
- Area: 7,677 ha (29.64 sq mi)
- Established: 2001
- Visitors: 171,759 (in 2017-18)
- Operator: BC Parks

Myra-Bellevue Provincial Park is a provincial park in British Columbia, Canada, located in the Okanagan Highland east of Kelowna. It was established to protect the full elevational range of the North Okanagan Basin and North Okanagan Highlands ecosections.

== Features ==
Myra-Bellevue Provincial Park includes:

- Angel Springs
- Bellevue Canyon
- Myra Canyon
- 18 trestles and 2 tunnels of the Kettle Valley Railway line, now a cycling and hiking route
- Little White Mountain, noted for its escarpment

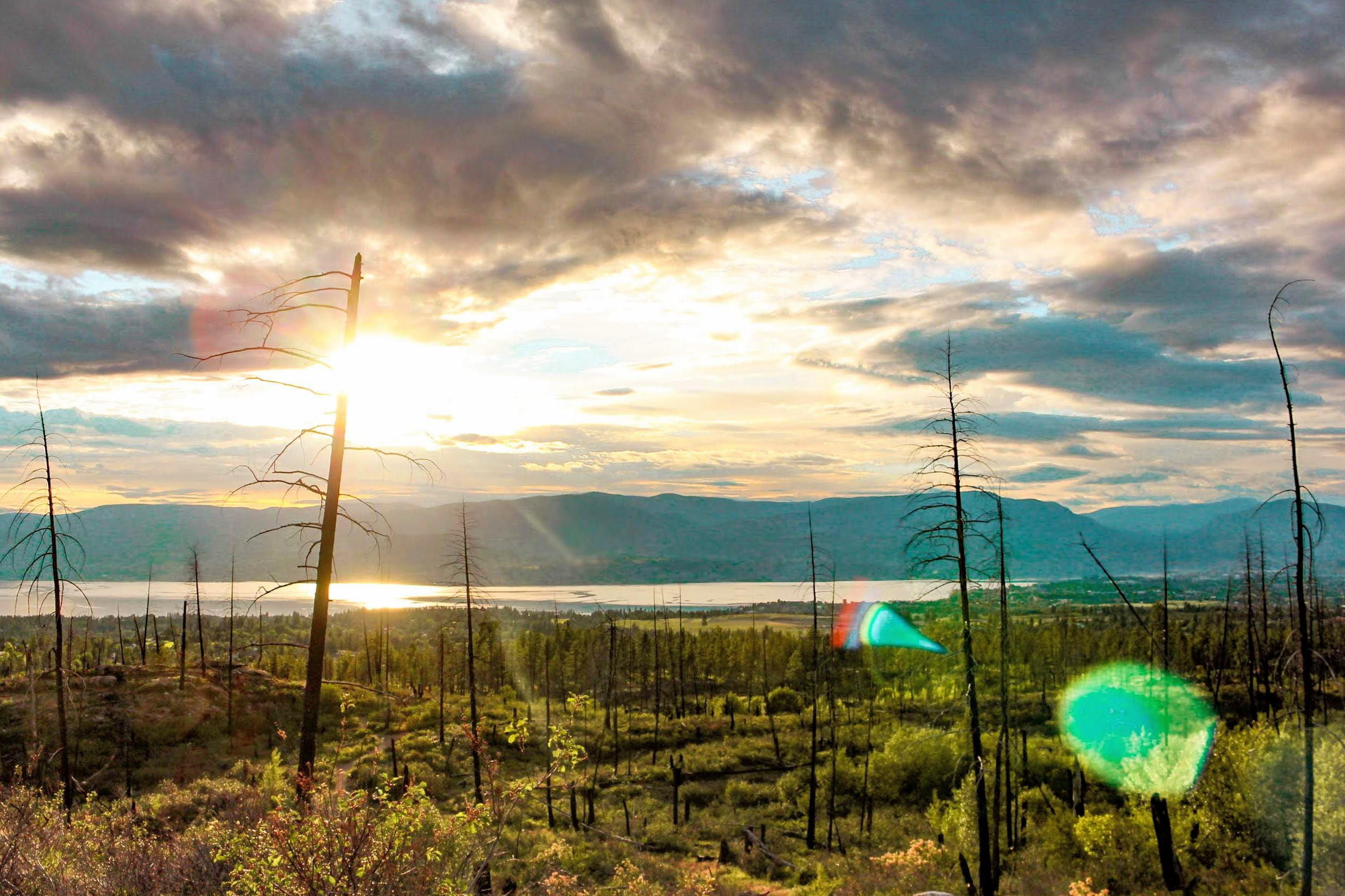
Sun through the clouds on a rainy summer evening

== Flora ==
includes:

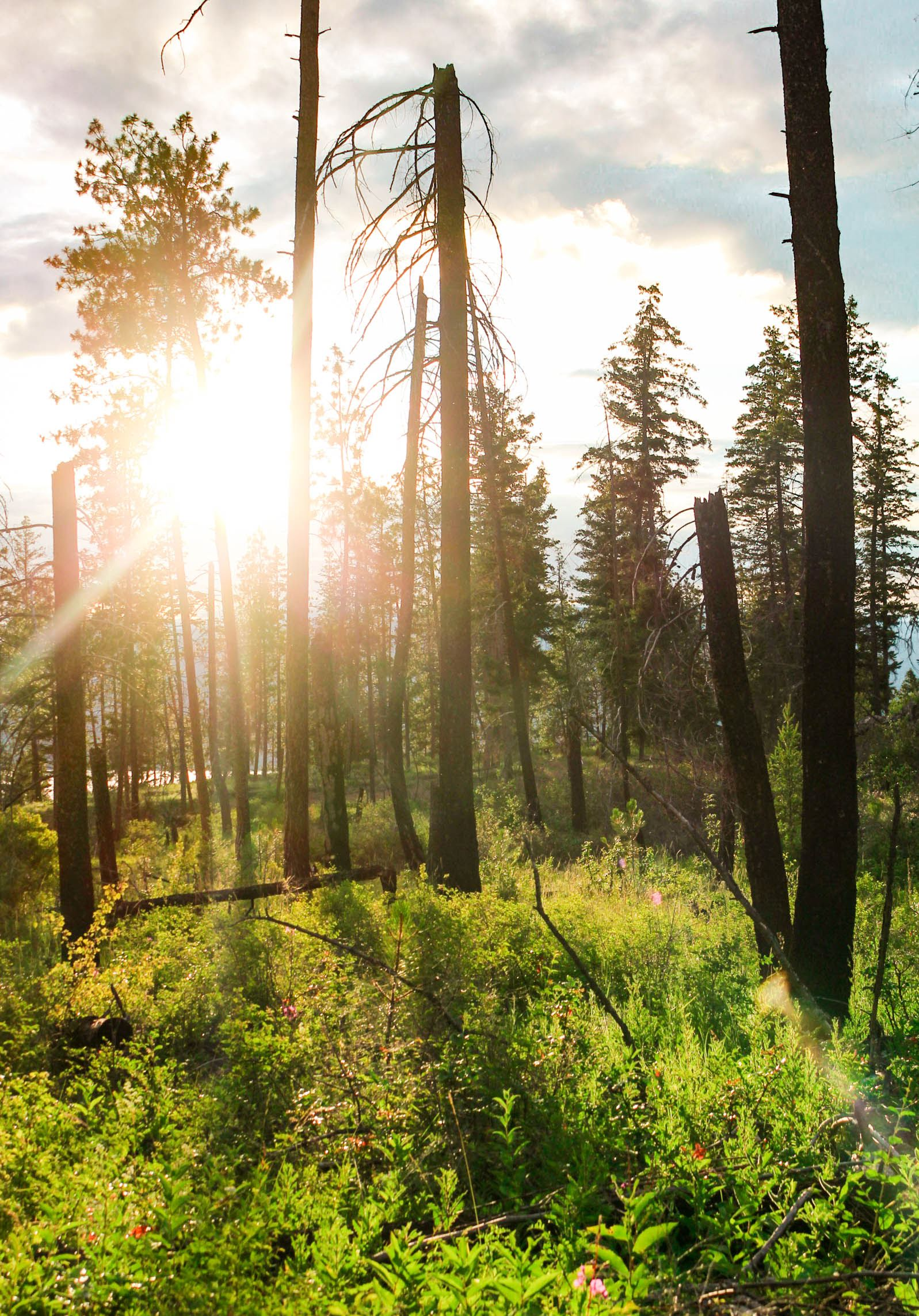

- Old Growth Ponderosa Pine
- Old Growth Douglas Fir
- Larch
- Engelmann Spruce
- Subalpine Fir

== Fauna ==
includes:

- Mountain goats in winter
- White-throated Swifts
- Flammulated Owl
- Lewis’ Woodpecker
- Spotted Bat
- Boreal Owl
- Western Screech-owl
- Northern Alligator Lizard
- Elk
- Deer
- Moose
- Cougar
- Grizzly Bear
- Great Basin Pocket Mouse

== Images ==
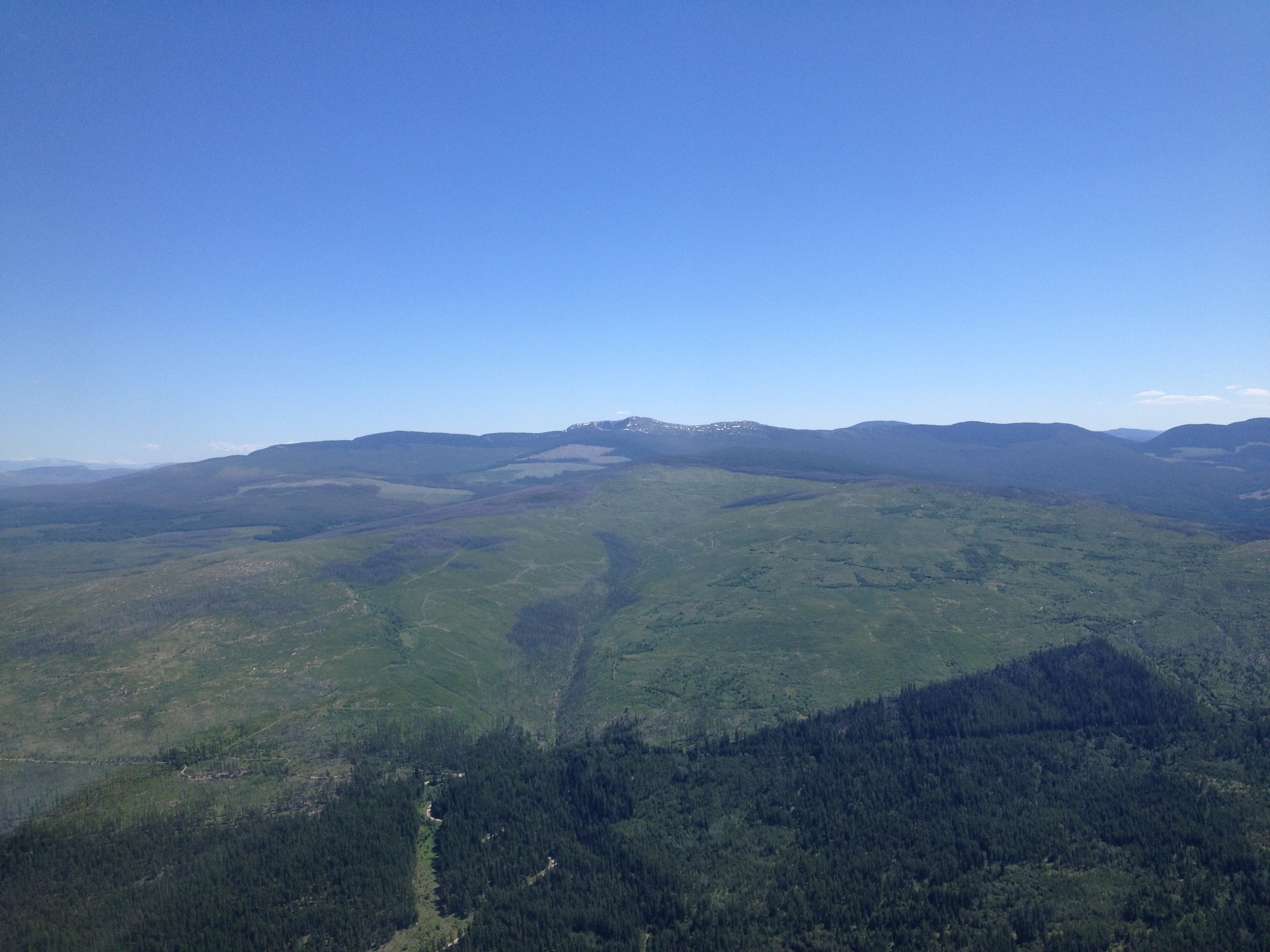
Myra-Bellevue as seen from the air looking south

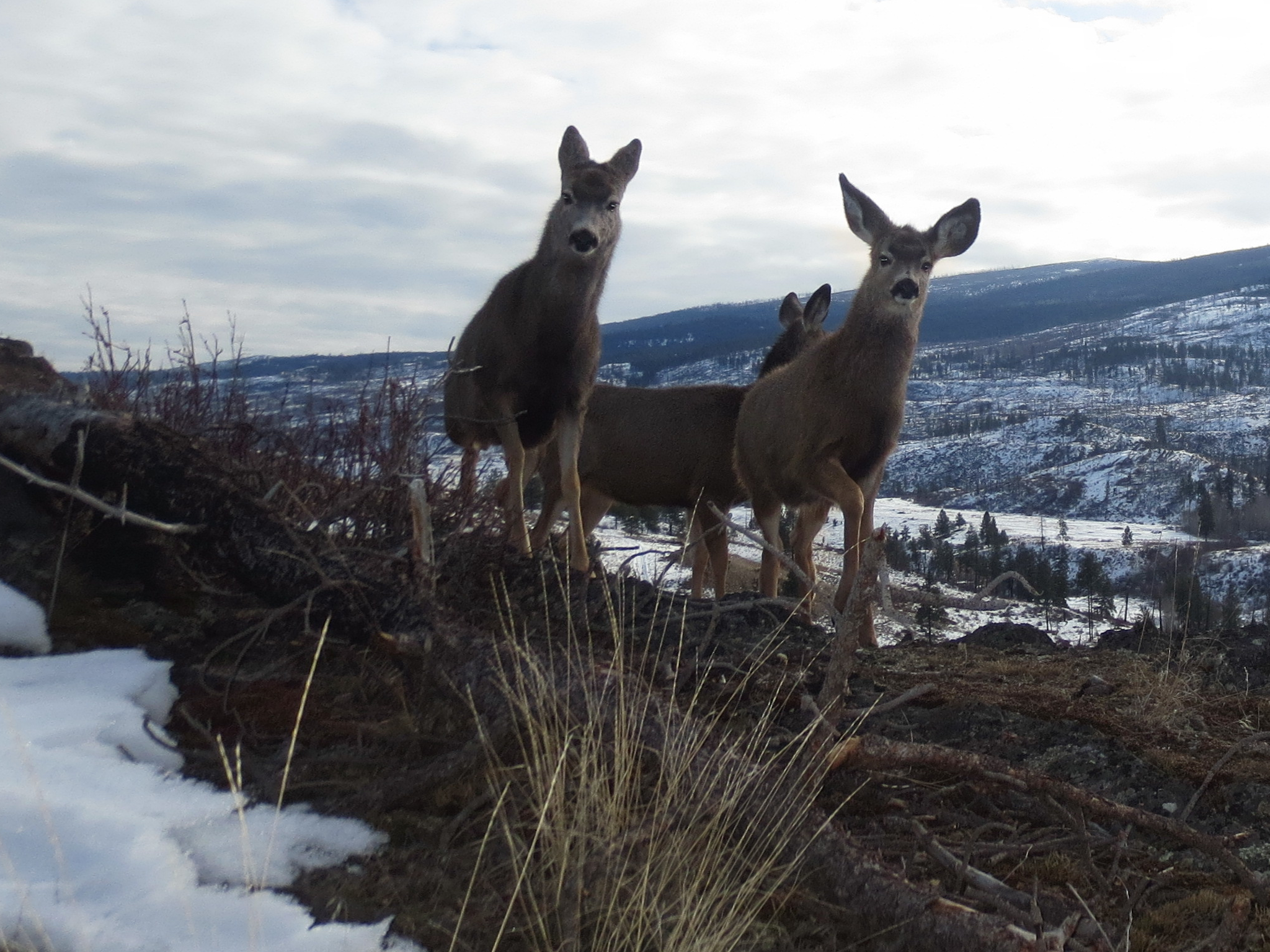
Small Group of Mule Deer

Summer Morning near the Angel Springs Trailhead

Summer Afternoon on the Lower Crawford Trail, looking towards Bellevue Canyon

Spring Morning at the North End of Myra Bellevue Park

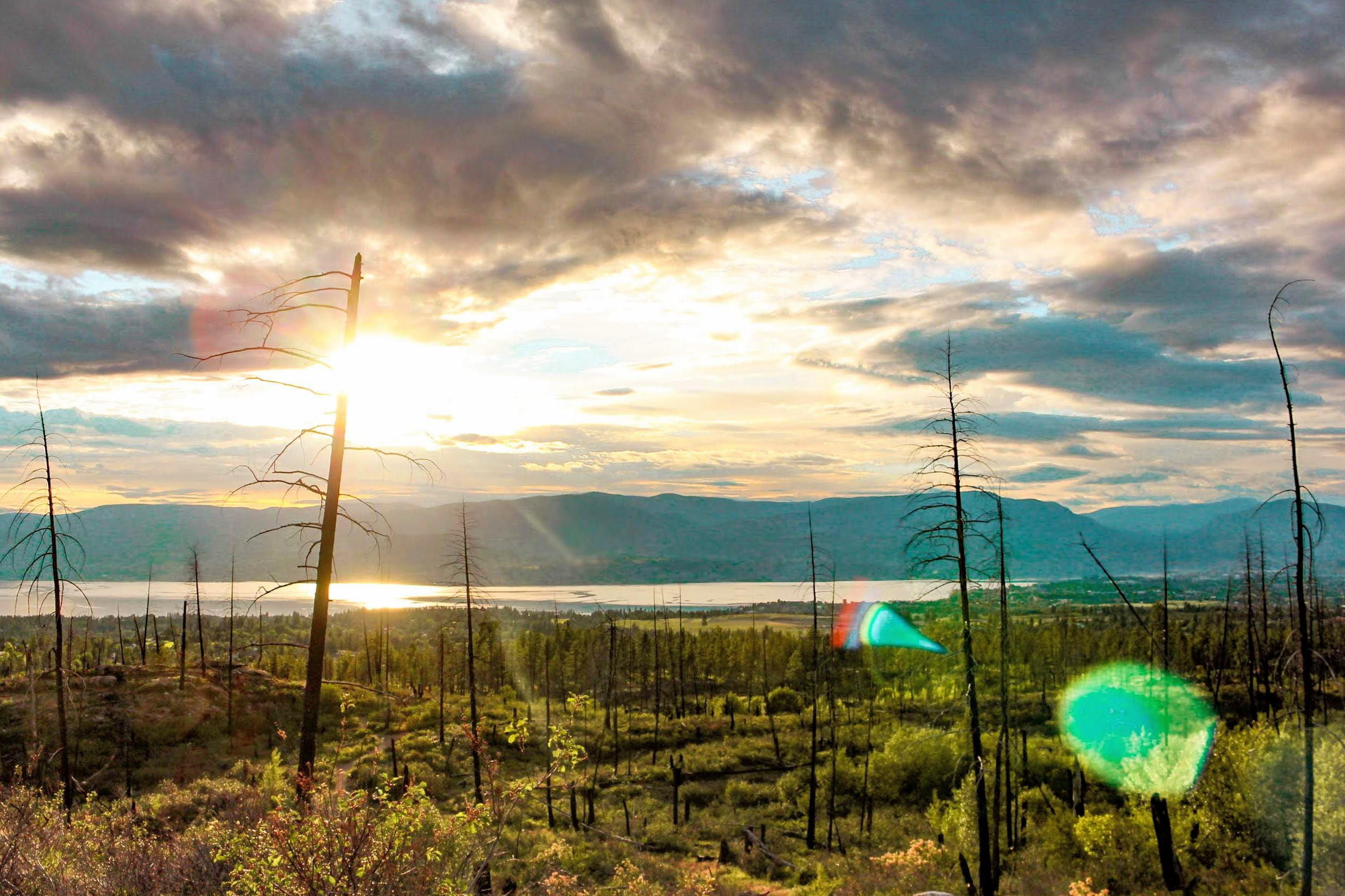
Sun through the clouds on a rainy summer evening
