= Dodaro =

Dodaro is a surname. Notable people with the surname include:

- Gene Dodaro (born 1951), American government official
- Melonie Dodaro (born 1969), Canadian social media expert, author, and entrepreneur
- Robert Dodaro (born 1955), American priest
