= Understory =

Plant life growing beneath a forest canopy

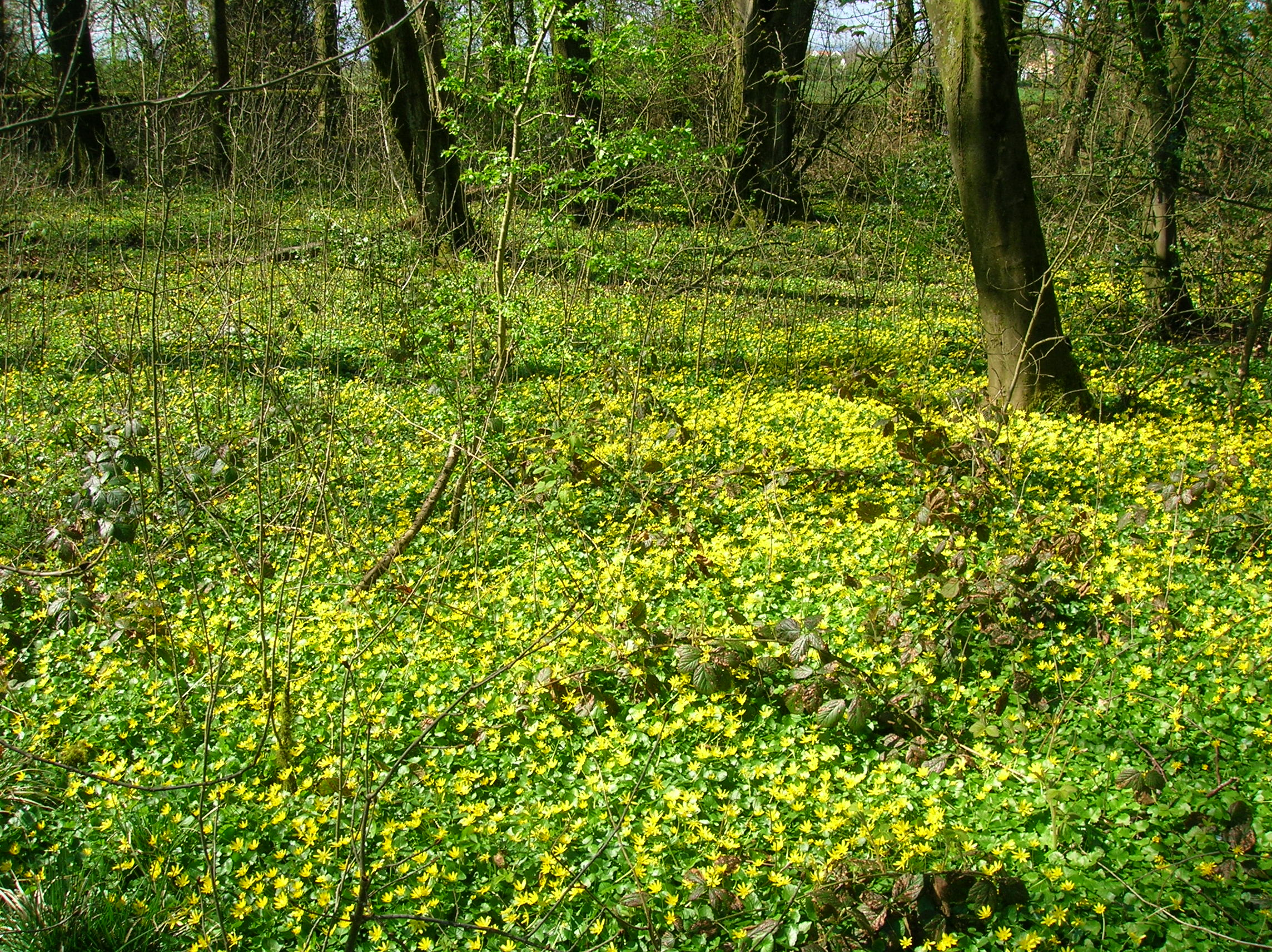
Lesser celandine (Ficaria verna) on forest floor in spring

In forestry and ecology, understory (American English), or understorey (Commonwealth English), also known as underbrush or undergrowth, includes plant life growing beneath the forest canopy without penetrating it to any great extent, but above the forest floor. Only a small percentage of light penetrates the canopy, so understory vegetation is generally shade-tolerant. The understory typically consists of trees stunted through lack of light, other small trees with low light requirements, saplings, shrubs, vines, and undergrowth. Small trees such as holly and dogwood are understory specialists.

In temperate deciduous forests, many understory plants start into growth earlier in the year than the canopy trees, to make use of the greater availability of light at that particular time of year. A gap in the canopy caused by the death of a tree stimulates the potential emergent trees into competitive growth as they grow upward to fill the gap. These trees tend to have straight trunks and few lower branches. At the same time, the bushes, undergrowth, and plant life on the forest floor become denser. The understory experiences greater humidity than the canopy, and the shaded ground does not vary in temperature as much as open ground. This causes a proliferation of ferns, mosses, and fungi and encourages nutrient recycling, which provides favorable habitats for many animals and plants.

== Understory structure ==
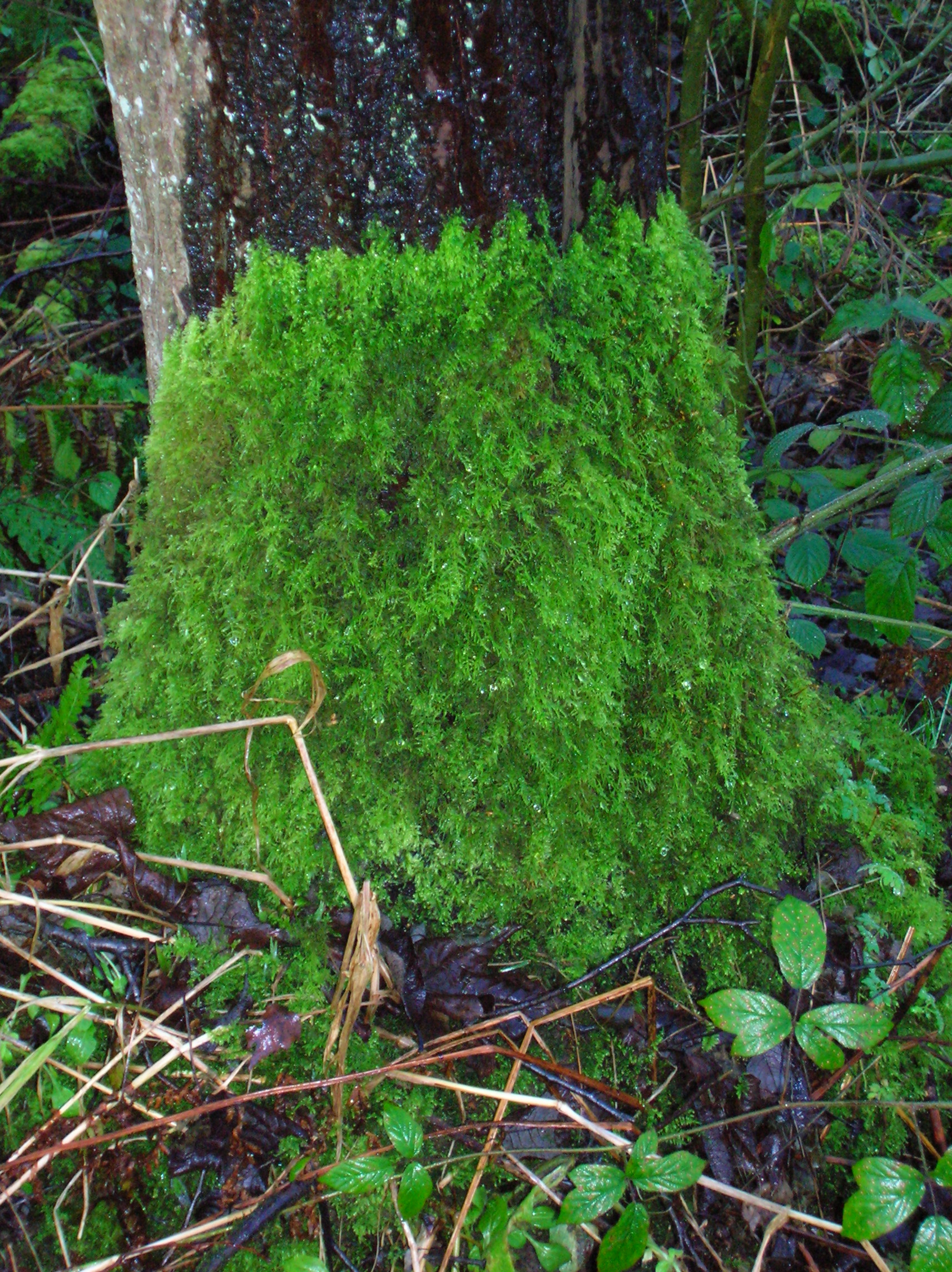
Tree base showing moss understory limit

Summer understory growing near the Angel Springs Trailhead of Myra-Bellevue Provincial Park

The understory is the underlying layer of vegetation in a forest or wooded area, especially the trees and shrubs growing between the forest canopy and the forest floor. Plants in the understory comprise an assortment of seedlings and saplings of canopy trees together with specialist understory shrubs and herbs. Young canopy trees often persist in the understory for decades as suppressed juveniles until an opening in the forest overstory permits their growth into the canopy. In contrast understory shrubs complete their life cycles in the shade of the forest canopy. Some smaller tree species, such as dogwood and holly, rarely grow tall and generally are understory trees.

The canopy of a tropical forest is typically about 10 m (33 ft) thick, and intercepts around 95% of the sunlight. The understory therefore receives less intense light than plants in the canopy and such light as does penetrate is impoverished in wavelengths of light that are most effective for photosynthesis. Understory plants therefore must be shade tolerant—they must be able to photosynthesize adequately using such light as does reach their leaves. They often are able to use wavelengths that canopy plants cannot. In temperate deciduous forests towards the end of the leafless season, understory plants take advantage of the shelter of the still leafless canopy plants to "leaf out" before the canopy trees do. This is important because it provides the understory plants with a window in which to photosynthesize without the canopy shading them. This brief period (usually 1–2 weeks) is often a crucial period in which the plant can maintain a net positive carbon balance over the course of the year.

As a rule forest understories also experience higher humidity than exposed areas. The forest canopy reduces solar radiation, so the ground does not heat up or cool down as rapidly as open ground. Consequently, the understory dries out more slowly than more exposed areas do. The greater humidity encourages epiphytes such as ferns and mosses, and allows fungi and other decomposers to flourish. This drives nutrient cycling, and provides favorable microclimates for many animals and plants, such as the pygmy marmoset.

== See also ==
- Fire-stick farming
- Layers of rainforests
- Overgrazing
