= WT Small House =

Coordinates: 49.81687°N 119.47591°W

WT Small House is reputed to be the oldest continually inhabited home in Kelowna, British Columbia, Canada. It is listed on the Kelowna Heritage Register as a highly valued example of early residential pioneer settlement in the Okanagan Valley.

The Home was constructed with adze-cut squared logs and dovetail joints on two-storey wood frame. William Thomas Small, a blind miller at The Lequime Mill built the original portion of the house in 1890 with three of his sons, Fred, Charles and William. The fieldstone fireplace in the parlour is carved with the year of construction '1890'. The house was sold in 1908 to James Hugh Baillie, who added a two-storey wood frame front in 1910. Baillie sold the house in 1918 to C. Graham, whose wife is reputed to have built a second fieldstone fireplace in the sitting room. In 1930, the house was bought by Arthur H. Raymer (1880–1956) and his wife Edith Small, the daughter of WT Small (1884–1951) who had grown up in the house. Raymer's father had been Kelowna's first mayor when the city was incorporated in 1905. Raymer's daughter, Hilda and her husband W. Sinclair-Thompson lived there with their son and daughter Terry Gilbert and Wendy Edith. The Mulberry tree on the property was brought to Kelowna on a wagon from Ontario by William Small. The heritage value of the building is characterised by the organic growth of more than a century from early pioneer vernacular architecture to modern additions while retaining the original portions, still easily defined and recognisable today.

Small's wife was instrumental in founding the first school in the Mission Creek area in 1894. Six local families (Small, Casorso, Berard, Crawford, Dickson and Smith) gathered to refurbish the old Fred Gillard cabin under the guidance of William Small, the only carpenter in the party, to provide the first school in the area for the eighteen local children. They were taught by Fred Watson until 1900 for the sum of $720 per year (Okanagan Historical Society).
