= World Community Film Festival =

The World Community Film Festival is an annual film festival, which programs a lineup of documentary films in several cities in British Columbia. The festival is staged over three days in Courtenay in January each year, before travelling to Nanaimo, Kelowna and Duncan; in Kelowna, the largest city served by the festival, it is expanded to four days, with its organizing partners in that city programming an additional selection of films that were not screened in the smaller markets.

The festival's primary focus is on films about community-building, environmental issues, social justice and human rights.

The festival was first launched in 1990 in Courtenay, with its touring program launched in the early 2000s. The Kelowna event was added in 2007. The festival's touring program has also previously included other British Columbia cities, including Mission, Prince George, Terrace and Vancouver, and the festival has provided programming support to other new documentary film festivals across Canada, including the Guelph Film Festival.
