= Okanagan Mission, British Columbia =

Neighbourhood in Okanagan, British Columbia, Canada

Okanagan Mission
- Neighbourhood
- Lake Okanagan in winter near Maude Roxby Wetlands
- Nickname: The Mission
- Interactive map of Okanagan Mission
- Coordinates: 49°49′00″N 119°29′00″W
- Country: Canada
- Province: British Columbia
- Regional district: Central Okanagan
- City: Kelowna
- Founded: 1860

Okanagan Mission, also known colloquially as the Mission is a neighbourhood of the City of Kelowna in the Okanagan region of the Southern Interior of British Columbia, Canada, located on the south side of the city at the foot of Okanagan Mountain. It derives its name from the Okanagan Mission founded by Father Pandosy, historically known as the Okanagan Mission, which was located here and was the first non-native settlement in the Okanagan Valley.

The Mission once was a separate jurisdiction before being amalgamated with the City of Kelowna in the mid- to late-20th century. This has caused a fairly vibrant secondary commercial centre to emerge which is entirely separate from Downtown, with low to moderate density residential areas in between. The northern border of Mission is K.L.O. Rd. It is often differentiated as the Lower Mission and Upper Mission.

The Lower Mission contains most of the aforementioned commercial areas such as shopping malls, grocery stores, coffee shops, and boutiques. Lower Mission also has extensive recreational facilities, Mission Recreation Park has six softball diamonds as well as soccer fields, community gardens, playgrounds and trails, while neighbouring H2O is Kelowna's largest indoor recreation facility with a 50 m pool, water slides, diving boards and surfing wave. Gyro Beach and Rotary Beach, two of Kelowna's most popular beaches, are also located in the Lower Mission.

The Upper Mission begins to extend into the foothills and higher terrain, and many parts of this area feature views of the city, mountains and Okanagan Lake. As a result, this part of town is widely regarded as luxurious and is one of the most expensive neighbourhoods of Kelowna. Many homes are worth two million dollars or more, the most expensive of which can reach five million or even slightly above.
