= Kelowna =

City in British Columbia, Canada

- City
- City of Kelowna
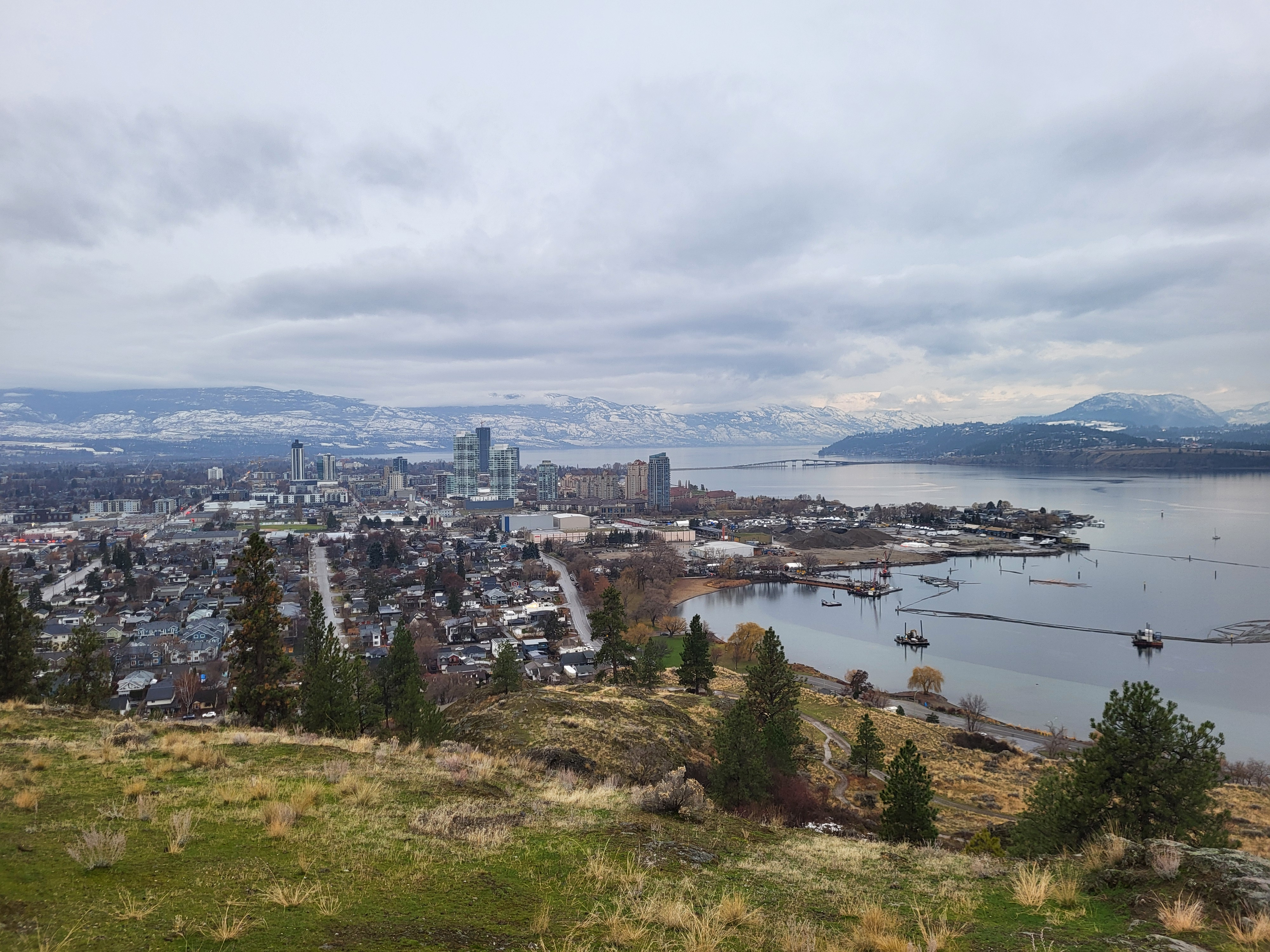
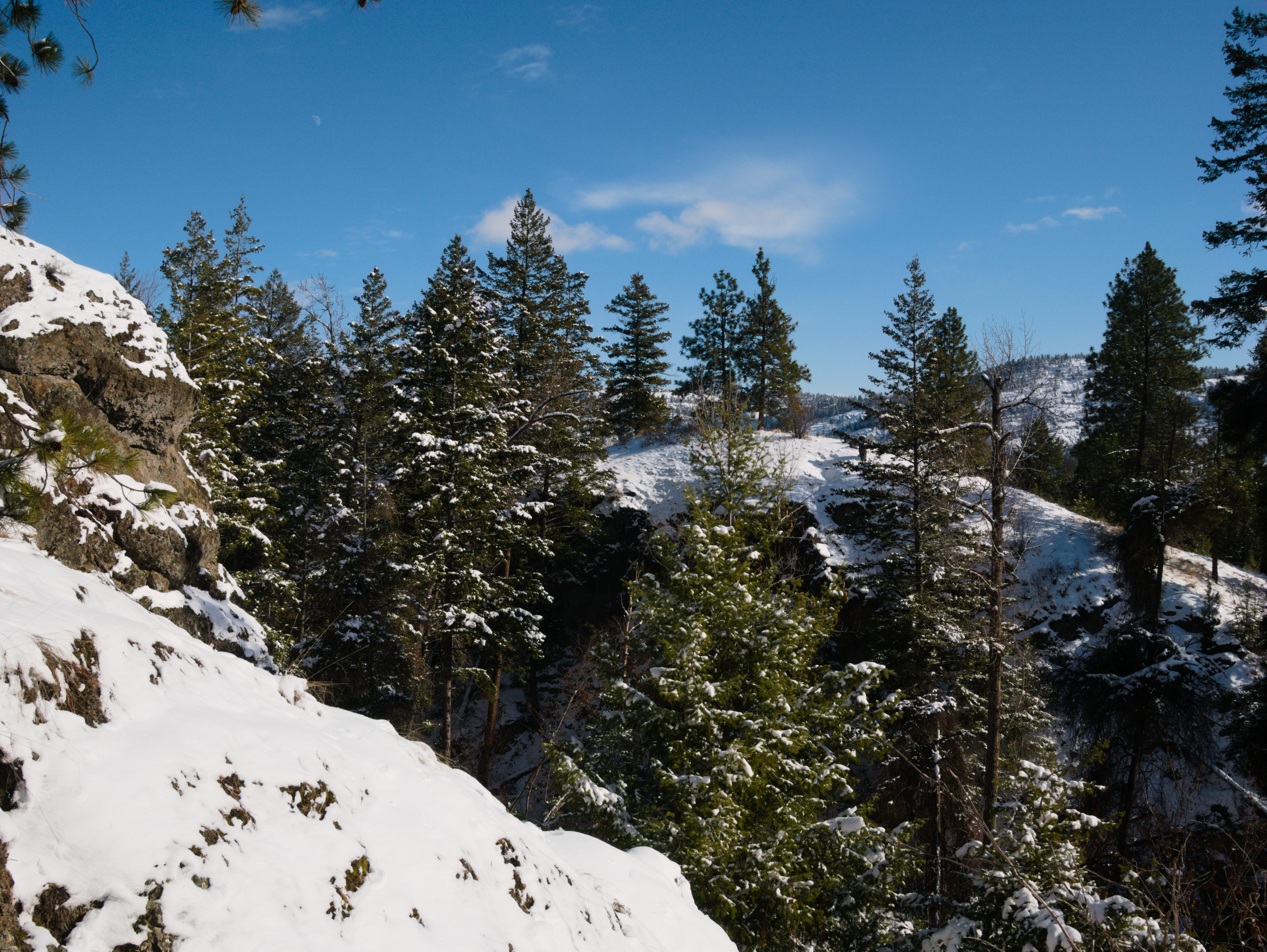
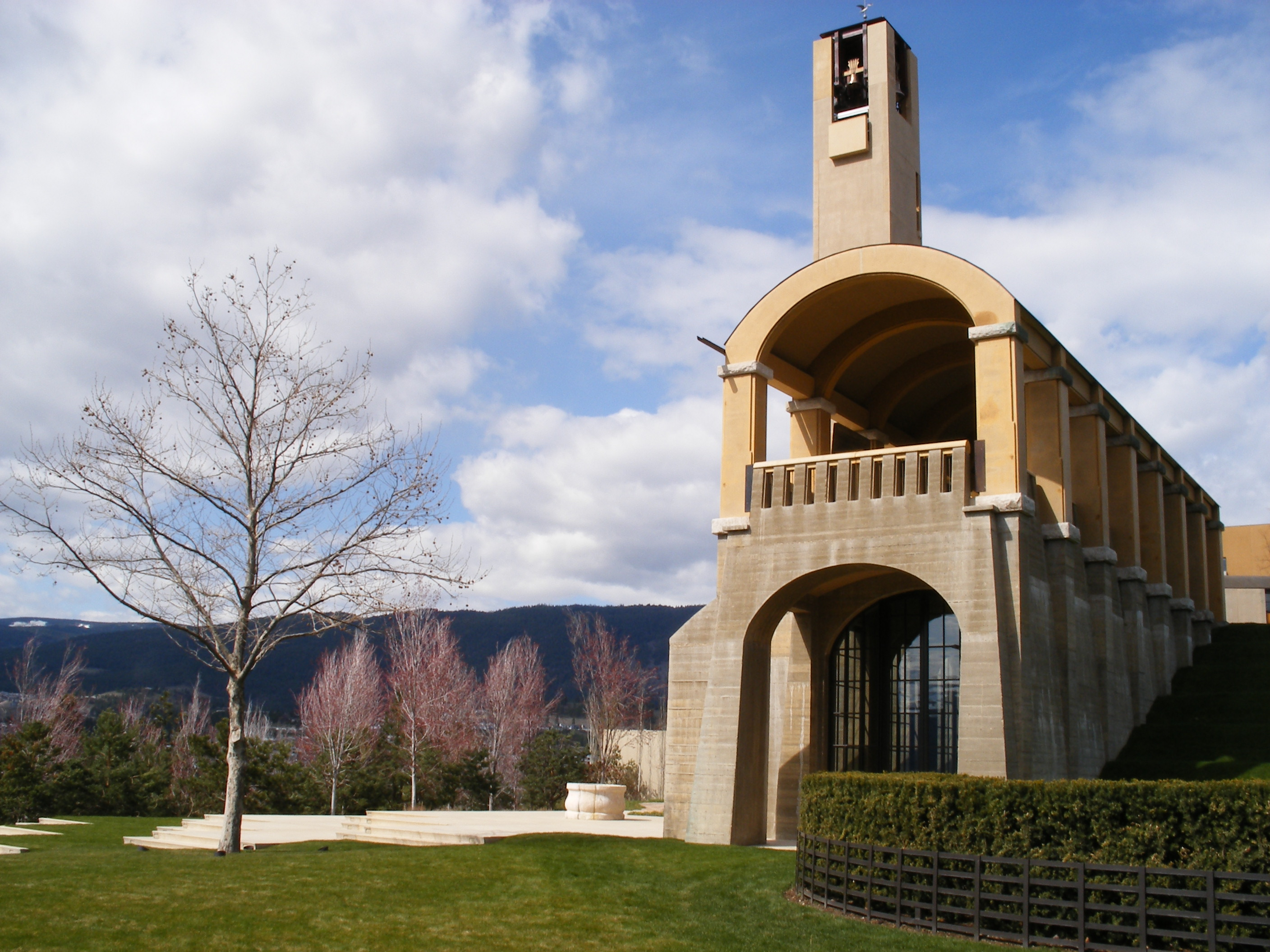
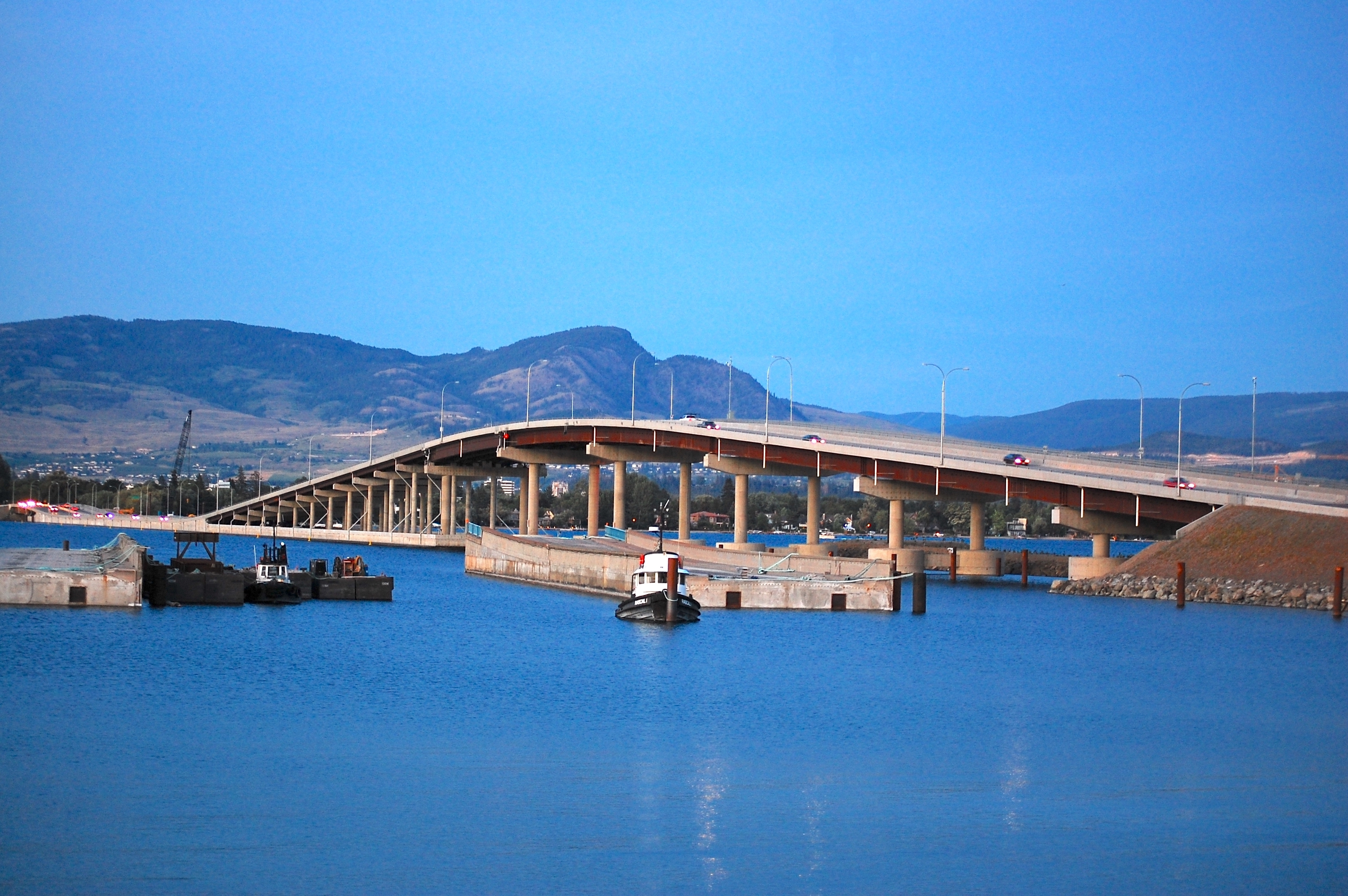
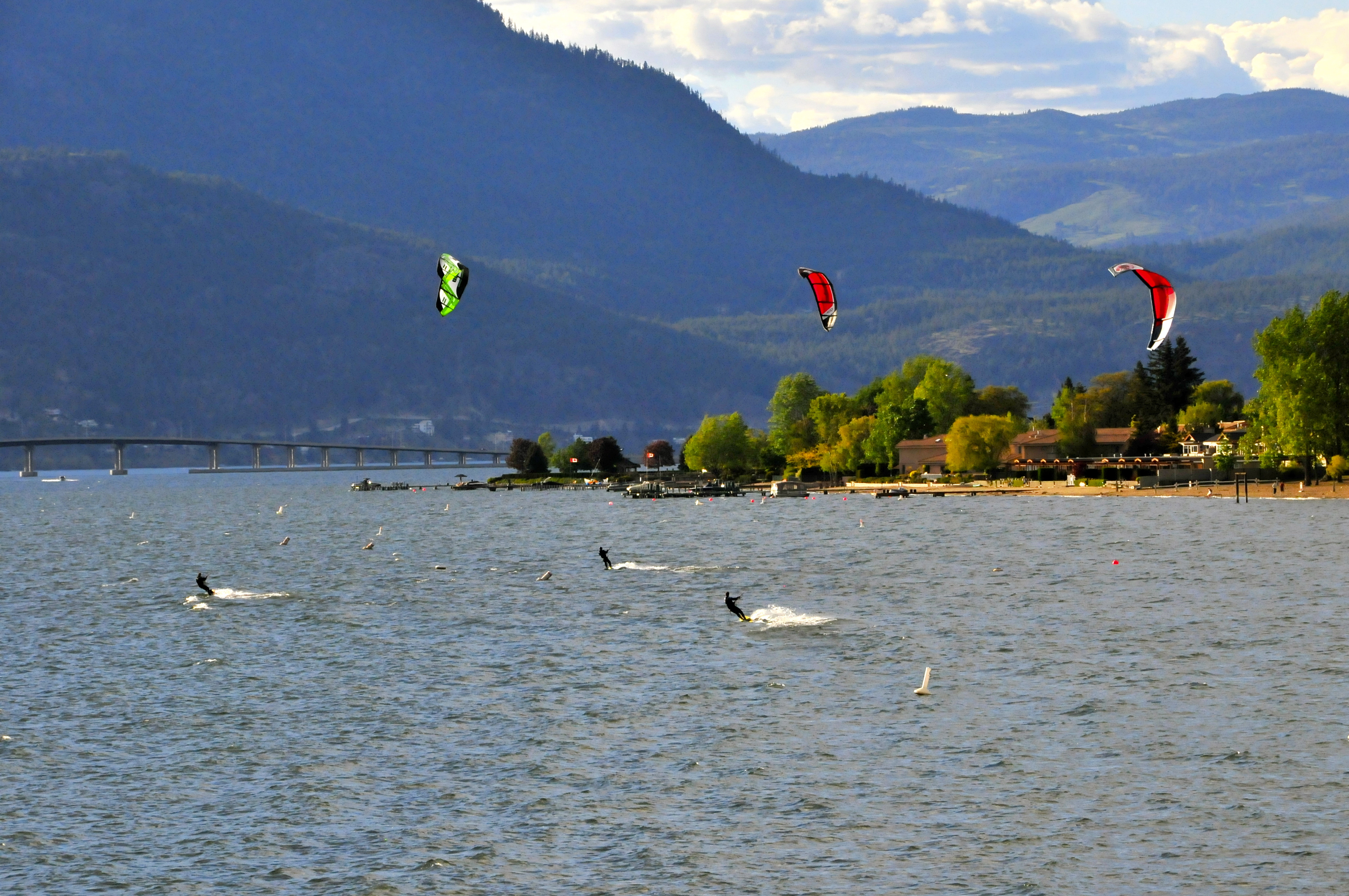
- From top, left to right: Downtown Kelowna from Knox Mountain Park, the peaks of Central Okanagan, Mission Hill Winery and Bell Tower, the William R. Bennett Bridge on Okanagan Lake, Okanagan Lake near Rotary Beach Park

- Flag Coat of arms Logo
- Nicknames: Orchard City, K-Town, Sun City, the Four Seasons Playground
- Motto: "Fruitful in Unity"
- Location of Kelowna
- Coordinates: 49°53′17″N 119°29′44″W
- Country: Canada
- Province: British Columbia
- Regional district: Central Okanagan
- Settled: 1859
- Incorporated: May 5, 1905

Government
  - Type: Elected city council
  - Body: Kelowna City Council
  - Mayor: Tom Dyas
  - MP: Dan Albas (CPC); Stephen Fuhr (LPC)
  - MLAs: Kristina Loewen (CPBC); Tara Armstrong (Ind.); Gavin Dew (CPBC)

Area
  - Land: 214 km^{2} (83 sq mi)
  - CMA: 2,902.45 km^{2} (1,120.64 sq mi)
- Elevation: 344 m (1,129 ft)

Population (2025)
  - Total: 165,907
  - Rank: 7th
  - Density: 682.4/km^{2} (1,767/sq mi)
  - CMA: 222,162
  - CMA density: 76.5/km^{2} (198/sq mi)
- Demonym(s): Kelownian, Kelownan

Gross Metropolitan Product
  - Kelowna CMA: CA$11.3 billion (2020)
- Time zone: UTC−07:00 (PT)
- Forward sortation area: V1P, V1V – V1Z, V4T
- Area codes: 250, 778, 236, 672
- GNBC Code: JAFUV
- Website: kelowna.ca

Kelowna (/kəˈloʊnə/ kə-LOH-nə) is a city on Okanagan Lake in the Okanagan Valley in the southern interior of British Columbia, Canada. It serves as the head office of the Regional District of Central Okanagan. The name Kelowna derives from the Okanagan word kiʔláwnaʔ, referring to a grizzly bear.

Kelowna is the province's third-largest metropolitan area (after Vancouver and Victoria). It is the seventh-largest municipality in BC and the largest in the Interior. It is the 20th-largest metropolitan area in Canada. The city proper encompasses 214 km^{2} (83 sq mi), and the census metropolitan area encompasses 2,902.45 km^{2} (1,120.64 sq mi). Kelowna's population in 2025 is 165,907 in the city proper and 254,605 in the metro area.

Nearby communities include the City of West Kelowna (also referred to as Westbank and Westside) to the west, across Okanagan Lake; Lake Country and Vernon to the north; Peachland to the southwest; and Summerland and Penticton to the south.

== History ==
The exact dates of the first settlement in the Okanagan Valley are unknown, but a northern migration led to the habitation of this area some 9,000 years ago. The Indigenous Syilx people are the first known inhabitants of the region where they continue to live today.

In 1811, David Stuart travelled to the Okanagan Valley, becoming the first European to do so. Despite this, it was not until 1859 that Father Pandosy, a French Roman Catholic Oblate missionary, became the first European to settle there. Pandosy's settlement was located at l'Anse au Sable (Bay of Sand), which he named in reference to its sandy shoreline. Although the population remained small for the rest of the 19th century, sustenance fruit growing expanded in Kelowna during the 1870s, and by the 1890s, commercial agriculture had become firmly established.

Kelowna was officially incorporated on May 4, 1905, with a population of 600. The town's first mayor was Henry Raymer.

Although agriculture had become an important mark of Kelowna in the surrounding region, the town relied entirely on transportation over Okanagan Lake until 1925. In 1893, the Canadian Pacific Railway (CP) constructed the steamer SS Aberdeen on the lake, which served as the first significant transportation link between Kelowna and Penticton, greatly increasing the speed of Kelowna's growth. On September 11, 1925, CP was extended to Kelowna, ending the town's reliance on Okanagan Lake for transportation and trade.

In 1911, Chinese revolutionary Sun Yat-sen visited Kelowna for fundraising. At that time, approximately 15% of the population was ethnically Chinese.

On August 6, 1969, a sonic boom from a nearby air show broke a quarter million dollars worth of glass, injuring six people. The destruction was caused by a member of the United States Blue Angels during a practice routine for the Kelowna Regatta festival when the pilot accidentally broke the sound barrier while flying too low.

On November 25, 2005, the First Ministers and National Aboriginal Leaders signed the Kelowna Accord, which sought to improve the lives of Indigenous peoples.

Kelowna celebrated its centennial in May 2005. The same year, construction began on the five-lane William R. Bennett Bridge to replace the three-lane Okanagan Lake Bridge as part of a plan to alleviate traffic problems during the summer tourist season. The new bridge was completed in 2008.

On July 12, 2021, a crane suffered a catastrophic failure while being dismantled at a construction site located at St. Paul Street near Bernard Avenue in downtown Kelowna. Part of the crane struck a nearby office building and a seniors home. The city declared a local state of emergency, and the area's residents were evacuated. Five people were killed in the collapse: four construction workers and one person in the office building.

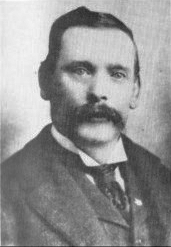
Henry Raymer, the first mayor of Kelowna

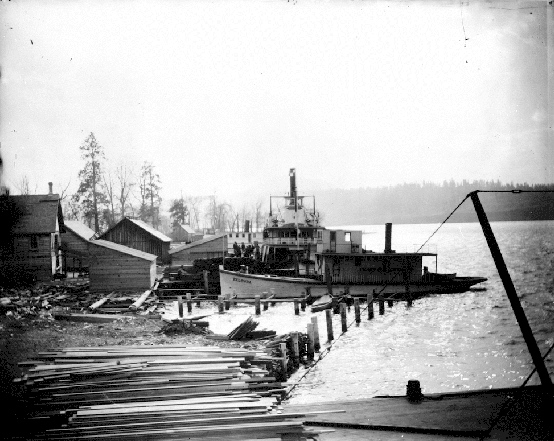
The SS Aberdeen (back) and a smaller steamship (the Kelowna, front) in the dock at Kelowna in 1906

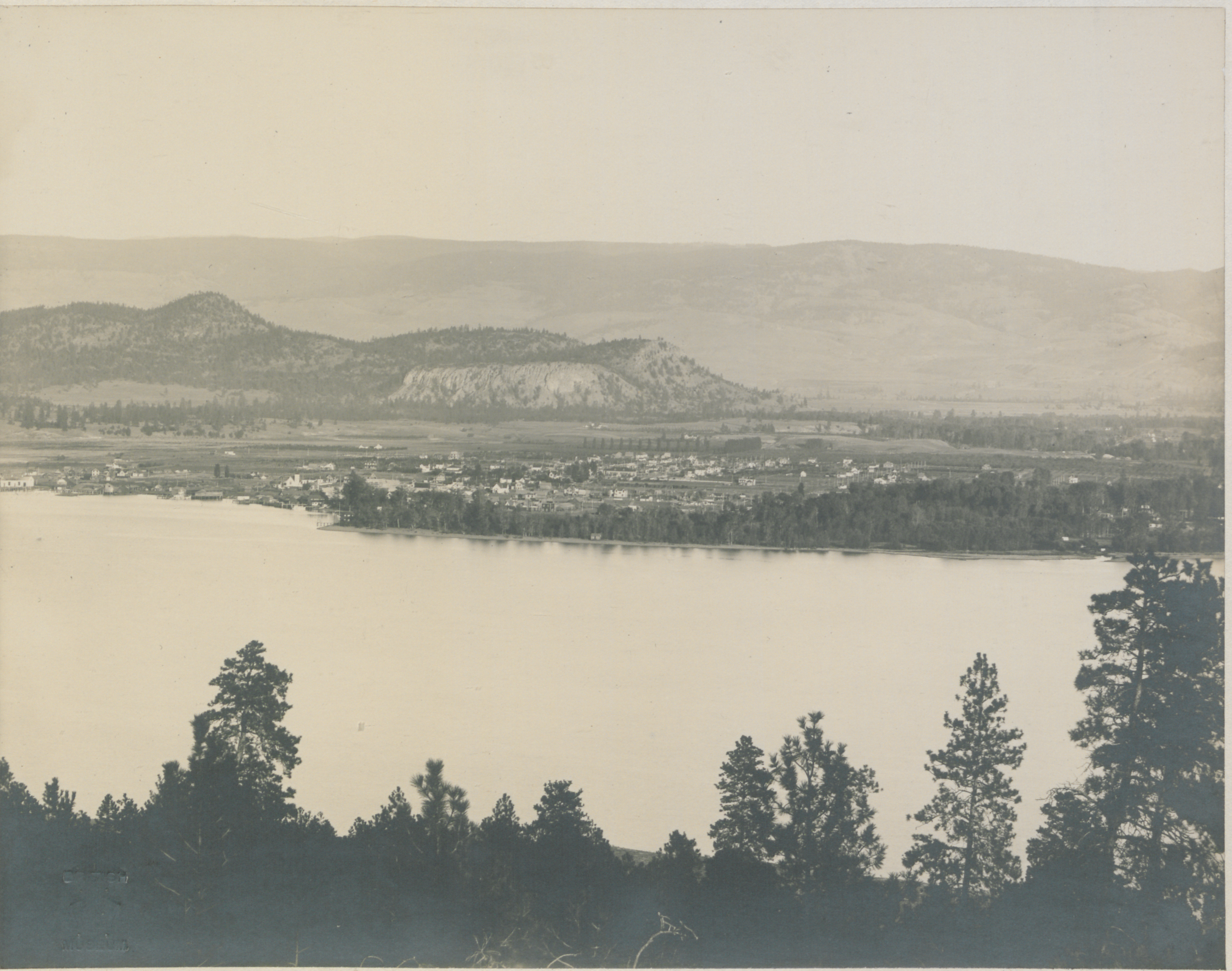
Kelowna in 1909 as viewed from across Okanagan Lake

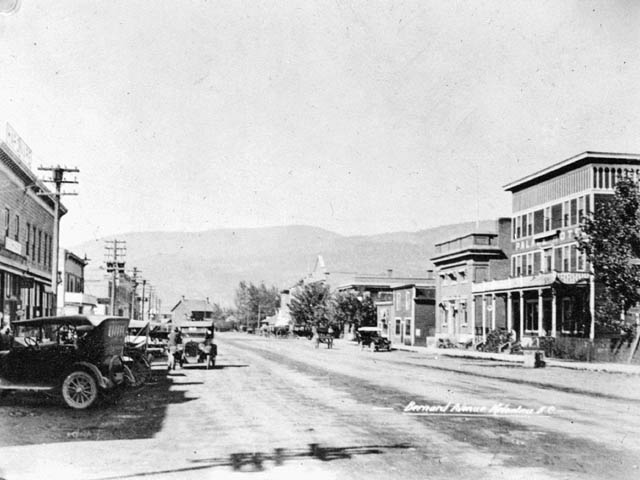
The centre of Kelowna during the 1920s

=== Wildfires ===
In Kelowna, many seasonal wildfires have occurred over the years. Some significant fires warranting evacuations and/or causing damage are listed below:

- In August 2003, a nearby wildfire destroyed 239 homes and forced the temporary evacuation of about 30,000 residents. Many trestles of the historic Kettle Valley Railway were destroyed. The trestles have been rebuilt to look like the originals but using smaller dimension beams. This fire consumed 25,000 hectares (62,000 acres) of land.
- In July 2009, wildfires destroyed hundreds of hectares of forest and several buildings in West Kelowna; 17,000 residents were evacuated.
- In July 2009, a 100 ha (250 acres) fire near Rose Valley caused the evacuation of 7,000 people. No structures were lost.
- In July 2009, a 9,200 ha (23,000 acres) fire behind Fintry caused the evacuation of 2,500 people. No structures were lost.
- In September 2012, a late-season, 200 ha (490 acres) fire destroyed seven buildings and caused the evacuation of 1,500 people in the community of Peachland.
- In July 2014, a 340 ha (840 acres) fire behind the West Kelowna subdivision of Smith Creek caused the evacuation of 3,000 people.
- In July 2015, a 560 ha (1,400 acres) fire near Shelter Cove caused the evacuation of 70 properties.
- In August 2015, a 130 ha (320 acres) fire burned near Little White Mountain, just south of Kelowna.
- In August 2017, a 400 ha (990 acres) fire in the Joe Rich area caused the evacuation of over 474 properties.
- In August 2023, a 6,800 ha (17,000 acres) fire was burning in the McDougall Creek area on the west side of Okanagan Lake, causing the evacuation order of over 2,400 properties; winds carried embers across the lake to Kelowna, spawning fires and the loss of city structures.

== Geography ==
=== Landmarks ===
- Mission Creek
- Bellevue Canyon
- Layer Cake Hill
- Pinnacle Rock
- Gallagher's Canyon
- Crawford Falls
- Knox Mountain
- Myra Canyon
- Mission Creek Falls
- Black Knight Mountain
- Maude-Roxby Wetlands
- Okanagan Lake

=== Vegetation ===
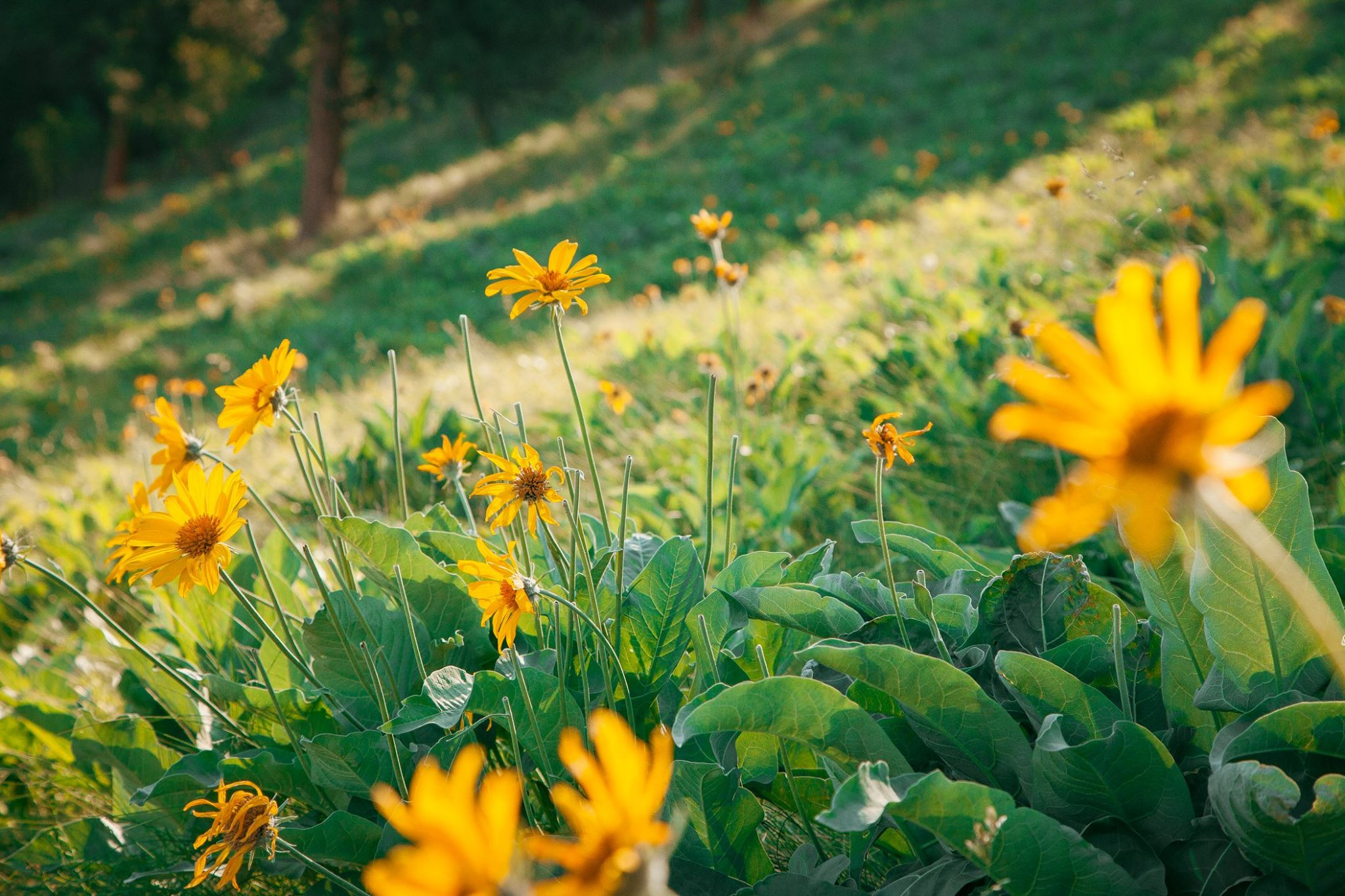
Balsamorhiza sagittata, found on Knox Mountain

Kelowna's official flower is Balsamorhiza sagittata, commonly referred to as arrowleaf balsamroot.

=== Climate ===
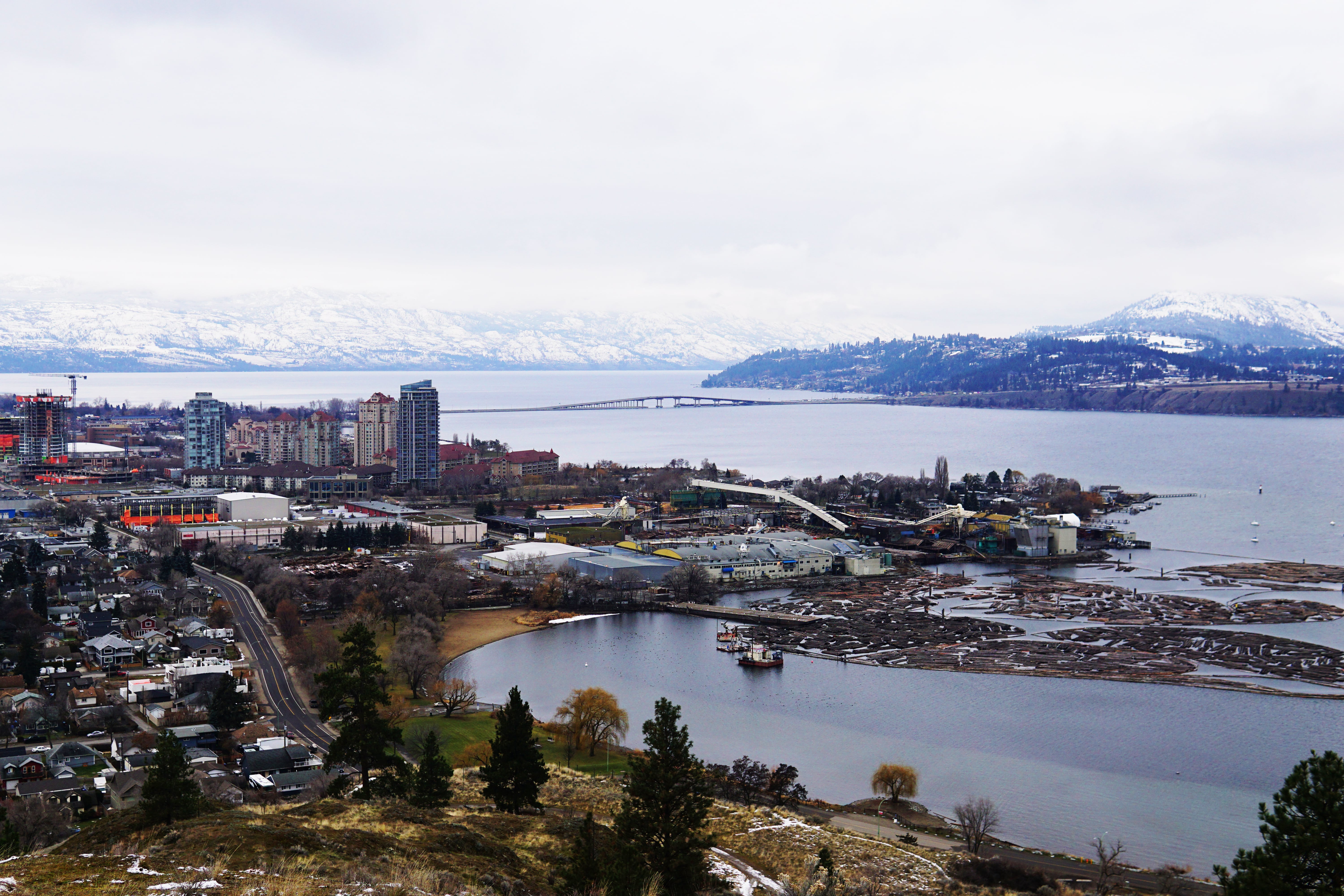
Kelowna from Knox Mountain in winter, 2019

Kelowna is classified as a humid continental climate or an inland oceanic climate per the Köppen climate classification system due to its coldest month having an average temperature slightly above −3.0 °C (26.6 °F) and below 0 °C (32 °F), with dry, hot, sunny summers and cool, cloudy winters, and four seasons. The official climate station for Kelowna is at the Kelowna International Airport, which is at a higher elevation than the city core, with slightly higher precipitation and cooler nighttime temperatures. Kelowna has the second mildest winter of any non-coastal city in Canada, after neighbouring Penticton. This is caused by the moderating effects of Okanagan Lake combined with mountains separating most of BC from the prairies; however bitter Arctic air masses can occasionally penetrate the valley during winter, usually for very short periods. The coldest recorded temperature in the city was −36.1 °C (−33.0 °F) recorded on December 30, 1968. The last time the lake completely froze over was in the winter of 1969. A partial lake freeze also took place in the winter of 1985–1986. Some winters pass without any significant surface ice.

An inversion layer of cloud created by a Pacific low-pressure system moving into or stalling over the southern interior gives Kelowna and the Okanagan Valley near-constant cloudy conditions during December and January, making it the cloudiest winter climate in Canada outside of parts of Newfoundland. Since Okanagan Lake rarely freezes, the warmer air from the lake rises above the colder atmospheric air, leading to a temperature inversion that also contributes to the valley being enveloped by clouds. This valley cloud has a low ceiling, and often bright sunshine can be experienced by driving approximately 20 minutes up into the nearby mountains. Summer days in Kelowna are very warm with periods of hot and sunny conditions. Temperatures typically reach the high 30s °C, or above for at least a few days each summer. The hottest temperature ever recorded in Kelowna was 45.7 °C (114.3 °F) on June 29, 2021. During summer, clear, dry air allows night-time temperatures to fall rapidly, however in the built-up city near lakeside, nights are somewhat warm on average by Canadian standards. The city averages about 380 mm (15 in) of precipitation per year, with about a fifth of the precipitation falling as snow, the bulk in December and January; however, June is the wettest month of the year, followed by a sharp drying trend through the remainder of summer.

While some smaller communities such as Blue River and Golden get less wind, Kelowna has the greatest percentage of "calm" wind observations for any major city in Canada (39% of the time). The four-year average wind measured at the airport has been less than 5 knots (9.3 km/h; 5.8 mph) on average 10 to 12 months of the year between 2008 and 2011. Kelowna has an average high temperature that is above freezing every month of the year, rare for an inland Canadian city.

Climate data for Kelowna (Kelowna International Airport) WMO ID: 71203; coordinates 49°57′22″N 119°22′40″W; elevation: 429.5 m (1,409 ft); 1991-2020 normals (average temperature only) 1981–2010 normals, extremes 1899–present (Note: Extreme high and low temperatures were recorded near downtown Kelowna from March 1899 to September 1962, at Kelowna CDA from October 1962 to September 1968, at Kelowna International Airport from October 1968 to December 2013, and at University of British Columbia Okanagan from December 2013 to present.)
Month	Jan	Feb	Mar	Apr	May	Jun	Jul	Aug	Sep	Oct	Nov	Dec	Year
Record high humidex	13.0	14.5	21.1	28.0	37.0	48.0	46.4	45.6	34.9	26.7	20.6	17.8	48.0
Record high °C (°F)	14.8 (58.6)	17.2 (63.0)	20.8 (69.4)	28.1 (82.6)	34.4 (93.9)	45.7 (114.3)	39.7 (103.5)	39.3 (102.7)	35.0 (95.0)	26.8 (80.2)	20.6 (69.1)	17.8 (64.0)	45.7 (114.3)
Mean maximum °C (°F)	7.9 (46.2)	10.3 (50.5)	16.5 (61.7)	23.0 (73.4)	29.2 (84.6)	32.7 (90.9)	35.8 (96.4)	35.2 (95.4)	29.4 (84.9)	21.1 (70.0)	12.7 (54.9)	8.6 (47.5)	35.8 (96.4)
Mean daily maximum °C (°F)	0.6 (33.1)	3.9 (39.0)	9.7 (49.5)	15.5 (59.9)	20.5 (68.9)	24.2 (75.6)	28.5 (83.3)	27.8 (82.0)	22.0 (71.6)	13.3 (55.9)	5.6 (42.1)	1.1 (34.0)	14.4 (57.9)
Daily mean °C (°F)	−2.9 (26.8)	−0.7 (30.7)	3.7 (38.7)	8.2 (46.8)	12.9 (55.2)	16.6 (61.9)	19.9 (67.8)	19.1 (66.4)	14.0 (57.2)	7.2 (45.0)	1.6 (34.9)	−2.3 (27.9)	8.1 (46.6)
Mean daily minimum °C (°F)	−6.3 (20.7)	−5.3 (22.5)	−2.3 (27.9)	0.8 (33.4)	5.2 (41.4)	8.9 (48.0)	11.3 (52.3)	10.3 (50.5)	5.9 (42.6)	1.1 (34.0)	−2.4 (27.7)	−5.7 (21.7)	1.8 (35.2)
Mean minimum °C (°F)	−17.9 (−0.2)	−14.6 (5.7)	−9.3 (15.3)	−4.3 (24.3)	−0.1 (31.8)	3.9 (39.0)	6.5 (43.7)	5.5 (41.9)	0.4 (32.7)	−5.3 (22.5)	−10.8 (12.6)	−17.0 (1.4)	−17.9 (−0.2)
Record low °C (°F)	−31.7 (−25.1)	−28.3 (−18.9)	−22.2 (−8.0)	−9.4 (15.1)	−4.2 (24.4)	−1.1 (30.0)	2.6 (36.7)	0.6 (33.1)	−6.1 (21.0)	−15.7 (3.7)	−28.4 (−19.1)	−36.1 (−33.0)	−36.1 (−33.0)
Record low wind chill	−39.7	−33.0	−25.0	−9.8	−5.4	−0.6	0.0	0.0	−7.3	−18.2	−36.3	−37.6	−39.7
Average precipitation mm (inches)	31.0 (1.22)	19.0 (0.75)	21.6 (0.85)	29.1 (1.15)	40.2 (1.58)	45.9 (1.81)	37.2 (1.46)	32.1 (1.26)	32.4 (1.28)	29.2 (1.15)	36.7 (1.44)	32.6 (1.28)	386.9 (15.23)
Average rainfall mm (inches)	8.9 (0.35)	10.0 (0.39)	16.9 (0.67)	28.3 (1.11)	39.2 (1.54)	45.9 (1.81)	37.2 (1.46)	32.1 (1.26)	31.7 (1.25)	29.1 (1.15)	24.4 (0.96)	7.6 (0.30)	311.3 (12.26)
Average snowfall cm (inches)	26.9 (10.6)	10.8 (4.3)	4.8 (1.9)	0.8 (0.3)	0.0 (0.0)	0.0 (0.0)	0.0 (0.0)	0.0 (0.0)	0.0 (0.0)	0.1 (0.0)	13.6 (5.4)	32.0 (12.6)	89.0 (35.0)
Average precipitation days (≥ 0.2 mm)	13.9	10.3	10.5	10.9	12.9	12.0	9.2	8.5	8.7	11.3	14.4	14.1	136.6
Average rainy days (≥ 0.2 mm)	5.6	6.2	8.8	10.7	12.2	12.0	9.2	8.5	8.3	11.3	11.0	4.2	107.8
Average snowy days (≥ 0.2 cm)	10.0	5.6	2.4	0.6	0.0	0.0	0.0	0.0	0.0	0.2	4.7	11.0	34.5
Average relative humidity (%)	76.4	65.2	48.8	39.8	40.0	39.3	35.6	36.2	42.2	55.6	70.6	75.7	52.1
Mean monthly sunshine hours	39.4	80.9	148.5	191.0	238.2	244.9	297.8	281.6	216.2	124.5	50.9	35.1	1,948.9
Percentage possible sunshine	14.8	28.5	40.4	46.3	49.9	50.2	60.5	62.8	56.9	37.2	18.6	13.9	40.0
Source: Environment and Climate Change Canada

Climate data for Kelowna (PC Burnettes Nursery)
Month	Jan	Feb	Mar	Apr	May	Jun	Jul	Aug	Sep	Oct	Nov	Dec	Year
Record high °C (°F)	15.0 (59.0)	14.0 (57.2)	21.0 (69.8)	28.0 (82.4)	33.5 (92.3)	37.5 (99.5)	40.0 (104.0)	40.0 (104.0)	33.0 (91.4)	26.5 (79.7)	21.1 (70.0)	15.0 (59.0)	40.0 (104.0)
Mean daily maximum °C (°F)	2.0 (35.6)	4.4 (39.9)	10.1 (50.2)	15.7 (60.3)	20.8 (69.4)	24.6 (76.3)	27.8 (82.0)	27.7 (81.9)	22.0 (71.6)	13.8 (56.8)	6.4 (43.5)	1.5 (34.7)	14.7 (58.5)
Daily mean °C (°F)	−0.7 (30.7)	0.6 (33.1)	4.8 (40.6)	9.4 (48.9)	14.1 (57.4)	18.0 (64.4)	20.7 (69.3)	20.4 (68.7)	15.3 (59.5)	8.7 (47.7)	3.1 (37.6)	−1.1 (30.0)	9.4 (49.0)
Mean daily minimum °C (°F)	−3.4 (25.9)	−3.3 (26.1)	−0.5 (31.1)	3.1 (37.6)	7.4 (45.3)	11.3 (52.3)	13.5 (56.3)	13.1 (55.6)	8.5 (47.3)	3.6 (38.5)	−0.2 (31.6)	−3.7 (25.3)	4.1 (39.4)
Record low °C (°F)	−32.2 (−26.0)	−20.6 (−5.1)	−16.7 (1.9)	−6.1 (21.0)	−1.7 (28.9)	2.2 (36.0)	4.4 (39.9)	3.9 (39.0)	−2.8 (27.0)	−13.5 (7.7)	−26.0 (−14.8)	−28.5 (−19.3)	−32.2 (−26.0)
Average precipitation mm (inches)	29.8 (1.17)	20.3 (0.80)	21.2 (0.83)	23.7 (0.93)	31.5 (1.24)	40.0 (1.57)	33.5 (1.32)	26.3 (1.04)	27.0 (1.06)	24.2 (0.95)	35.0 (1.38)	32.3 (1.27)	344.8 (13.56)
Average rainfall mm (inches)	10.3 (0.41)	13.3 (0.52)	18.0 (0.71)	23.6 (0.93)	31.5 (1.24)	40.0 (1.57)	33.5 (1.32)	26.3 (1.04)	27.0 (1.06)	24.1 (0.95)	24.3 (0.96)	9.3 (0.37)	281.2 (11.08)
Average snowfall cm (inches)	19.5 (7.7)	7.0 (2.8)	3.2 (1.3)	0.1 (0.0)	0.0 (0.0)	0.0 (0.0)	0.0 (0.0)	0.0 (0.0)	0.0 (0.0)	0.2 (0.1)	10.7 (4.2)	23.0 (9.1)	63.7 (25.2)
Average precipitation days (≥ 0.2 mm)	11.9	8.8	9.2	9.5	11.0	10.2	9.2	7.5	7.9	10.1	13.4	11.3	120
Average rainy days (≥ 0.2 mm)	6.0	6.1	8.3	9.5	11.0	10.2	9.2	7.5	7.9	10.0	11.1	4.4	101.2
Average snowy days (≥ 0.2 cm)	6.9	2.9	1.4	0.09	0.0	0.0	0.0	0.0	0.0	0.14	2.6	7.5	21.53
Source: Environment Canada

== Sectors and neighbourhoods ==
Kelowna consists of ten sectors with multiple neighbourhoods within the sector boundaries.

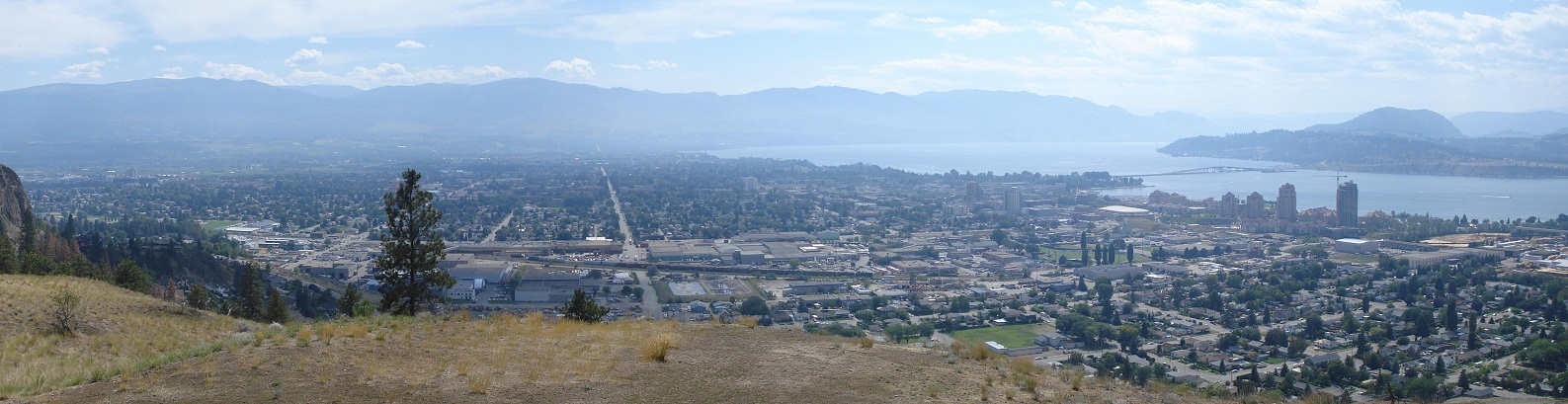
View of Kelowna and Okanagan Lake from Knox Mountain

=== Neighbourhoods ===
- Belgo
- Benvoulin
- Black Mountain
- Braeloch
- Central City
- Clifton
- Crawford
- Dilworth Mountain
- Downtown
- East Kelowna
- Ellison
- Glenmore
- North Glenmore
- Kettle Valley
- KLO
- McKinley Landing
- Midtown
- Mission
- North End
- Quail Ridge
- Pandosy
- Poplar Point
- Rutland
- South Kelowna
- Southridge

=== Central City ===
Central City is a linear commercial sector along Harvey Avenue, from downtown to Highway 33. Major commercial developments include the Capri Centre Mall, the Landmark buildings, and the Orchard Park Shopping Centre. Commercial activity is mainly concentrated along or near Highway 97 (Harvey).

=== Dilworth Mountain ===
Dilworth Mountain is a relatively low, isolated mountain just over 2000 feet near the city's geographic centre. Adjoining Knox Mountain to the west, it is part of the eastern heights that form Glenmore Valley and rises about one thousand feet above the rest of the Okanagan Valley. It has been extensively developed in recent years, with scenic suburban-influenced neighbourhoods only minutes from Central City.

=== Downtown ===
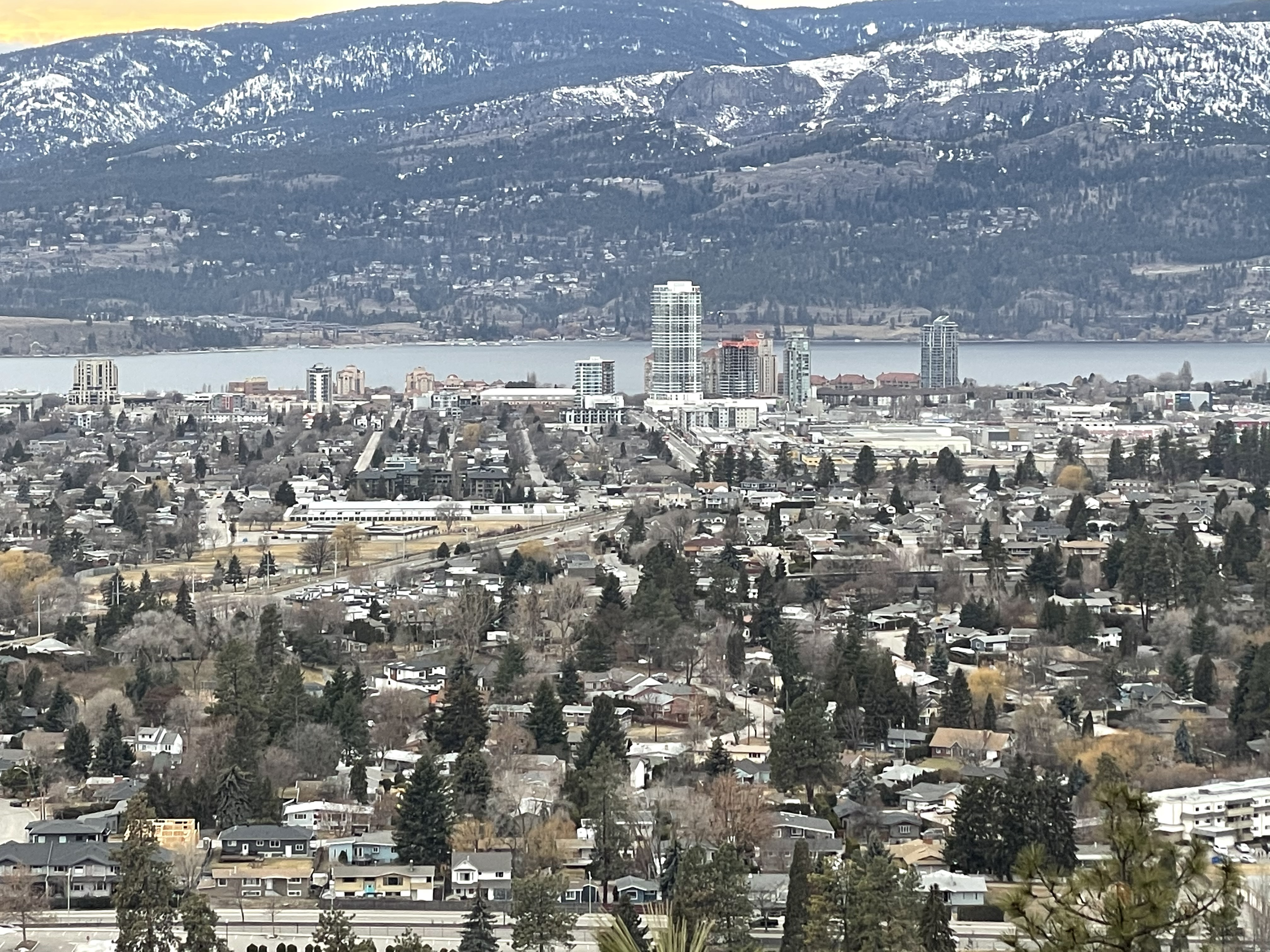
Downtown Kelowna from Dilworth Mountain in 2021

Central Kelowna is a tourist district alongside Okanagan Lake. It is officially defined as all land north of Highway 97, south of Clement Avenue, east of Okanagan Lake, and west of Richter Street. There are two main routes through the downtown core, along which attractions and commerce are concentrated. These include several parks and beaches, boardwalks and other walking trails, Kelowna Marina and Yacht Club, the Delta Grand Hotel and Casino, and Prospera Place arena. The other main route through downtown is Bernard Avenue from Richter Street to the lake, with more shops and restaurants designed for locals and tourists. Although Bernard Avenue continues east well past downtown, it is not part of downtown and is zoned residential. The commercial segment lies within its downtown section between Richter and Abbott streets, the latter of which is lake-adjacent.

After a period of suburban expansion into the surrounding mountain slopes, the city council adopted a long-term plan intended to increase density instead — particularly in the downtown core. This has resulted in the construction of taller buildings, including Water Street by the Park — a 42-storey building that is the tallest in Kelowna – opening for residences in 2025.

Kelowna has declared a 1 km^{2} (0.39 sq mi) downtown area a "red zone" of prolific drug trafficking, assaults and robberies. The red zone extends from Okanagan Lake to the west, Lake Avenue, Rowcliffe to Ethel and Ethel to Stockwell, Doyle and back to the lake. The red zone was identified in 1992 to reduce street crime. The RCMP conducts annual "spring sweeps" there, arresting low-level drug dealers. Kelowna was the second British Columbia city to declare a red zone.

=== Glenmore ===
Glenmore is a suburb primarily within Glenmore Valley, a subsection of the Okanagan Valley in the Kelowna area. It has been extensively developed in the past two decades, transforming from a small suburb with a rural character to large suburban neighbourhoods, including several elementary schools and a rapidly growing commercial hub. While most of its homes are on the relatively flat valley bottom, several large and more recent neighbourhoods, including the community of Wilden, are being built into the adjacent mountains.

=== Midtown ===
The Midtown area, bordered by Enterprise Way on the north and Springfield and Baron Road on the south, is a popular shopping destination for locals. Orchard Park, the shopping complex in BC's interior, is here. Since most of Midtown consists of large, car-oriented big-box stores, it is often criticized for its plainness; its contributions to urban sprawl and the decline of the pedestrian-oriented Downtown; and its lack of green space, as the area was formerly a linear park and golf course.

=== Mission ===
Known locally as "the Mission" (or "Okanagan Mission") to differentiate it from the Lower Mainland city of Mission, this area was a separate jurisdiction before being amalgamated with Kelowna in the mid-to-late-20th century. It features a vibrant secondary commercial centre separate from the downtown, with low- to moderate-density residential areas between them. Its northern border is K.L.O. Road. It is often differentiated as Lower Mission and Upper Mission.

The Lower Mission contains most of the aforementioned commercial areas, such as shopping malls, grocery stores, coffee shops, and boutiques, and also has extensive recreational facilities. Mission Recreation Park has six softball diamonds, soccer fields, community gardens, playgrounds, and trails while neighbouring H_{2}O is Kelowna's largest indoor recreation facility with a 50 m pool, water slides, diving boards, and surfing waves. Gyro Beach and Rotary Beach, two of Kelowna's most popular beaches, are also located in the Lower Mission.

=== Rutland ===
Rutland is Kelowna's largest neighbourhood by far. Although most of the area sits on the valley bottom and is therefore relatively flat, the fringes continue up into the hills and are thus built at higher elevations and possess more expansive views than the rest of the neighbourhood; these homes are correspondingly more expensive. This is the exception, however, as the majority of Rutland is among the most affordable of Kelowna housing. Additionally, the presence of numerous low-rise apartment buildings contributes to a higher population density compared to other areas of the town. Rutland was a town until it amalgamated with Kelowna in 1973, and this union has resulted in Rutland having a distinct commercial centre with many shops and restaurants. An improvement and gentrification effort has been ongoing for the past decade, with new parks, widened sidewalks, bike lanes, a renovated YMCA, a rebuilt high school, and many new shops and condominiums being added.

== Economy ==
The service industry employs the most people in Kelowna, the largest city in the tourist-oriented Okanagan Valley. In summer, boating, golf, hiking and biking are popular, and in winter, both skiing and snowboarding are favourite activities at the nearby Big White and Silver Star ski resorts. Tourism in the Greater Kelowna Area has now become a $1-billion a year industry, as of 2016.

Kelowna produces wines that have received international recognition. Vineyards are common around and south of the city where the climate is ideal for the many wineries. At least two major wineries were damaged or destroyed (now rebuilt) in 2003 due to the Okanagan Mountain Park Fire. Kelowna is also the home of Sun-Rype, a popular manufacturer of fruit bars and juices.

Okanagan College and University of British Columbia are the predominant centres for post-secondary education. Over 8,745 students attend Okanagan College and 8,718 students attend the University of British Columbia. In addition to vocational training and adult basic education, the college offers a highly regarded university transfer program. University of British Columbia's Okanagan campus has a student population of over 8,000 full-time students enrolled in diverse undergraduate and graduate programs.

Kelowna is the seat of the Regional District of the Central Okanagan, the third-largest metropolitan area in British Columbia after Vancouver and Victoria and the largest in the British Columbia Interior. With scenic lake vistas and a dry, mild climate, Kelowna has become one of the fastest-growing cities in North America. The appropriate management of such rapid development (and its attendant consequences) is a source of significant debate within the community. Kelowna is the fourth least affordable housing market in Canada, currently maintaining the classification of "Severely Unaffordable." Because of the Okanagan's climate and vineyard-filled scenery, it is often compared to Napa Valley, California.

=== Kelowna's use as a film locale ===
- Fido, a comedy/horror/thriller movie about zombies, was filmed in Kelowna and debuted on September 7, 2006, at the Toronto International Film Festival.
- Part of the movie Mee Shee: The Water Giant was filmed in Kelowna.
- The movies Shred and Shred 2 were partially filmed at Big White, a ski hill near Kelowna.
- Flicka: Country Pride, released in 2012, was filmed in Kelowna at several locations, such as Mission Creek Ranch, Kelowna Secondary School, and Gemstone Equestrian Centre.

=== Kelowna's use as a market trial location ===
Due to its moderate population, Kelowna is often used as a market trial area where national businesses and organizations can test a new product. Examples include:

- The Canadian Air Transport Security Authority piloted new whole body imaging technology for passenger screening at the Kelowna International Airport from 2008 to 2009.
- Telus Mobility re-launched its Clearnet discount mobile phone brand in Kelowna and Red Deer, Alberta, in 2011.
- Kelowna was the first city in Canada to have a permanent flow-rider located at the H_{2}O indoor water park.
- Peachwave opened its first Canadian store in Kelowna in 2013.
- Overwaitea Food Group opened its first Urban Fare location outside of downtown Vancouver in Kelowna.

== Demographics ==
Historical population
Year	Pop.	±%
1901	261	—
1911	1,661	+536.4%
1921	2,520	+51.7%
1931	4,655	+84.7%
1941	5,118	+9.9%
1951	8,517	+66.4%
1956	9,181	+7.8%
1961	13,188	+43.6%
1966	17,006	+29.0%
1971	19,412	+14.1%
1976	51,955	+167.6%
1981	59,196	+13.9%
1986	61,213	+3.4%
1991	75,950	+24.1%
1996	89,442	+17.8%
2001	96,288	+7.7%
2006	106,707	+10.8%
2011	117,312	+9.9%
2016	127,380	+8.6%
2021	144,576	+13.5%

In the 2021 Canadian census conducted by Statistics Canada, Kelowna had a population of 144,576 living in 62,209 of its 67,115 total private dwellings, a change of 13.5% from its 2016 population of 127,390. With a land area of 211.85 km^{2} (81.80 sq mi), it had a population density of 682.4/km^{2} (1,767.5/sq mi) in 2021.

At the census metropolitan area (CMA) level in the 2021 census, the Kelowna CMA had a population of 222,162 living in 94,335 of its 102,097 total private dwellings, a change of 14% from its 2016 population of 194,892. With a land area of 2,902.45 km^{2} (1,120.64 sq mi), it had a population density of 76.5/km^{2} (198.2/sq mi) in 2021.

In 2011, 48.4% of residents were male and 51.6% were female. The predominant language spoken in Kelowna is English.

Children under five accounted for approximately 4.8% of the resident population of Kelowna. This compares to 5.2% in British Columbia and 5.6% for Canada. In mid-2001, 18.4% of the resident population in Kelowna were of retirement age (65 and over for males and females), compared with 13.2% in Canada; the average age is 41.1, compared to an average age of 37.6 in Canada.

Kelowna's population growth has been driven primarily by the movement of Canadians from BC and other provinces into this region, not by international immigration. Only 15.1% of the population is foreign-born. On February 10, 2016, Statistics Canada declared the 3.1% Kelowna census metropolitan area growth rate as being the highest in Canada.

=== Religious groups ===
Largest non-Christian religion in Kelowna CMA by census tract based on the 2021 census

According to the 2021 census, the religious makeup of Kelowna was:

- irreligious (76,215 people, or 53.8%)
- Christian (56,270; 39.7%)
- Sikh (3,665; 2.6%)
- Muslim (1,560; 1.1%)
- Hindu (1,090; 0.8%)
- Buddhist (895; 0.6%)
- Jewish (530; 0.4%)
- Indigenous spirituality (95; 0.1%)

Religious groups in the City of Kelowna (1991−2021)
Religious group	2021 Canadian census		2011 Canadian census		2001 Canadian census		1991 Canadian census	
Religious group	Pop.	%	Pop.	%	Pop.	%	Pop.	%
Irreligion	76,215	53.76%	47,885	41.8%	29,435	31.06%	17,915	23.92%
Christianity	56,270	39.69%	62,410	54.47%	62,945	66.43%	55,470	74.05%
Sikhism	3,665	2.59%	1,525	1.33%	850	0.9%	490	0.65%
Islam	1,560	1.1%	480	0.42%	255	0.27%	95	0.13%
Hinduism	1,090	0.77%	455	0.4%	135	0.14%	125	0.17%
Buddhism	895	0.63%	570	0.5%	510	0.54%	300	0.4%
Judaism	530	0.37%	215	0.19%	220	0.23%	175	0.23%
Indigenous spirituality	95	0.07%	70	0.06%	10	0.01%	—N/a	—N/a
Other	1,440	1.02%	960	0.84%	400	0.42%	330	0.44%
Total responses	141,760	98.05%	114,570	97.66%	94,760	98.41%	74,905	98.62%
Total population	144,576	100%	117,312	100%	96,288	100%	75,950	100%

=== Ethnic groups ===
Largest ethnic origin in Kelowna CMA by census tract based on the 2021 census

The most common ethnicities in Kelowna as per the 2021 census are English (25.5%), Scottish (19.1%), German (18.9%), Irish (15.9%), Canadian (12.1%), French (8.9%), Ukrainian (8%), Dutch (4.5%), and Polish (4.4%).

As per the 2021 census, visible minorities comprised about 14% of the population of Kelowna. The largest groups of visible minorities were, in order of size, South Asian (4.4%), Chinese (1.9%), Filipino (1.7%), Black (1.3%), Latin American (0.9%) Japanese (0.9%), Southeast Asian (0.7%), Korean (0.5%), West Asian (0.5%), and Arab (0.4%).

Largest non-European panethnic group in Kelowna CMA by census tract based on the 2021 census

Panethnic groups in the City of Kelowna (2001−2021)
Panethnic group	2021		2016		2011		2006		2001	
Panethnic group	Pop.	%	Pop.	%	Pop.	%	Pop.	%	Pop.	%
European (Note: Statistic includes all persons that did not make up part of a visible minority or an indigenous identity.)	114,025	80.44%	105,550	85.03%	100,675	87.87%	95,050	90.38%	88,250	93.13%
Indigenous	7,940	5.6%	6,840	5.51%	5,145	4.49%	3,600	3.42%	2,150	2.27%
South Asian	6,300	4.44%	3,220	2.59%	2,630	2.3%	1,875	1.78%	1,205	1.27%
East Asian (Note: Statistic includes total responses of "Chinese", "Korean", and "Japanese" under visible minority section on census.)	4,650	3.28%	3,570	2.88%	2,980	2.6%	2,335	2.22%	1,890	1.99%
Southeast Asian (Note: Statistic includes total responses of "Filipino" and "Southeast Asian" under visible minority section on census.)	3,375	2.38%	1,975	1.59%	1,195	1.04%	1,000	0.95%	385	0.41%
African	1,885	1.33%	1,005	0.81%	685	0.6%	485	0.46%	315	0.33%
Latin American	1,315	0.93%	765	0.62%	525	0.46%	420	0.4%	345	0.36%
Middle Eastern (Note: Statistic includes total responses of "West Asian" and "Arab" under visible minority section on census.)	1,285	0.91%	600	0.48%	320	0.28%	150	0.14%	90	0.09%
Other/multiracial (Note: Statistic includes total responses of "Visible minority, n.i.e." and "Multiple visible minorities" under visible minority section on census.)	1,000	0.71%	615	0.5%	405	0.35%	260	0.25%	125	0.13%
Total responses	141,760	98.05%	124,135	97.45%	114,570	97.66%	105,170	98.56%	94,755	98.41%
Total population	144,576	100%	127,380	100%	117,312	100%	106,707	100%	96,288	100%
Note: Totals greater than 100% due to multiple origin responses

==== Chinese population ====
Kelowna had a historic Chinatown in the area between Harvey Avenue and Leon Avenue, east of Abbott and west of Highway 97 / Harvey Avenue. Historically, most residents of this Chinatown were males. In 1909, 15% of Kelowna's population was ethnic Chinese. In 1911, the percentage was the same. That year, Sun Yat-sen visited Kelowna for fundraising purposes. In 1978, the remaining traditional Chinese business ceased operations. By 2010, less than 1% of Kelowna's population was ethnic Chinese. A section of the façade of the rebuilt "Chinese Store" that was in Chinatown is now housed at the Kelowna Museum.

=== Homelessness ===
Women make up nearly half of Kelowna's homeless. In other Canadian cities, the overwhelming majority of homeless are males.

On May 12, 2003, the Kelowna Homelessness Networking Group conducted a limited census and enumerated 198 people: 54 individuals from the street and 144 individuals in shelters.

On February 24, 2016, as part of the Government of Canada's Homelessness Partnering Strategy, the Central Okanagan Foundation conducted a coordinated Point-in-Time (PiT) Count of Kelowna's homeless population. The survey found at least 233 people were homeless, and another 273 were living in temporary housing.

== Transportation ==
Kelowna has experienced significant suburbanization and urban sprawl promoted by the popularity of low-density car-oriented developments. In 2007, Kelowna had the highest car dependency rate in Canada and the second highest per-capita road transportation carbon footprint in British Columbia. With a population of about 230,000, the greater Kelowna area is slightly larger in land area than that of Metro Vancouver. Road transportation accounts for more than 65% of total greenhouse gas emission in the city.

=== Roads and highways ===
The city is served by Highway 97 and Highway 33.

=== Public transport ===
Kelowna Regional Transit System is operated by FirstGroup, providing public bus transportation services in Kelowna and its surrounding areas. Funding for the transit system is shared between the City of Kelowna, Central Okanagan Regional District, District of Lake Country and BC Transit.

=== Air travel ===
Kelowna International Airport (IATA: YLW), north of the city core, is one of the busiest airports in Canada. There are regular flights to and from Calgary, Edmonton, Toronto, Vancouver, Victoria, Cranbrook, Whitehorse, and Seattle, as well as seasonal service to Las Vegas, Phoenix, Montréal, Cuba and Mexico. Three major passenger airlines serve the airport: Air Canada, Alaska Airlines, and WestJet. The airport is also the main hub of cargo airline KF Cargo.

== Local services ==
Emergency services are provided by the Kelowna General Hospital, the British Columbia Ambulance Service, Kelowna Fire Department, Central Okanagan Search and Rescue and the Royal Canadian Mounted Police.

== Venues and attractions ==
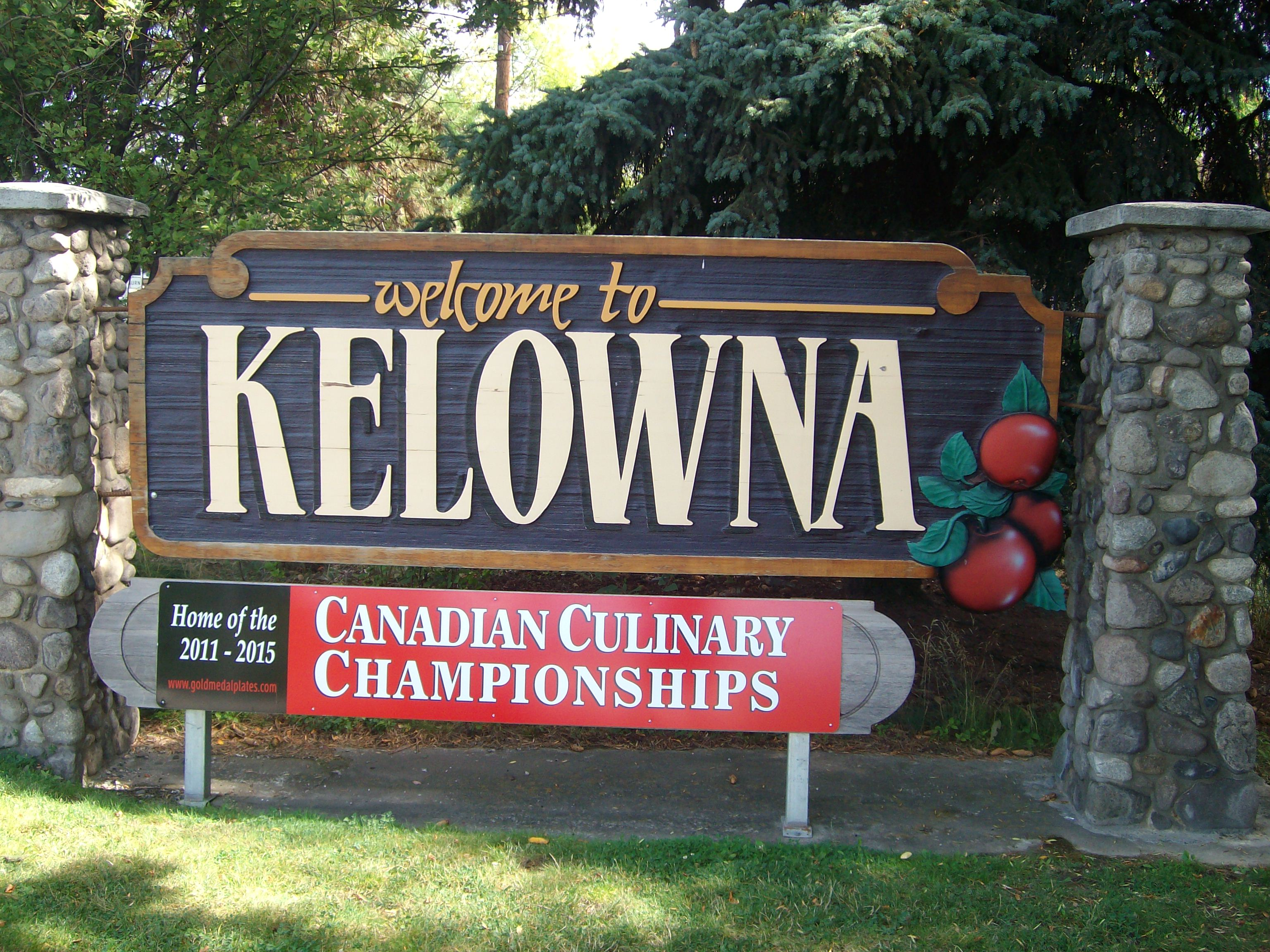
Kelowna's welcome sign on Highway 97

- Prospera Place, a 6,800-seat indoor arena
- Apple Bowl, a 2,314-seat outdoor stadium
- Elks Stadium, a 1,250-seat outdoor baseball stadium
- Kelowna Art Gallery
- Centre of Gravity Festival in City Park
- Kettle Valley Railway (Myra Canyon Trestles)
- Big White Ski Resort
- Okanagan Wineries

== Culture and sport ==
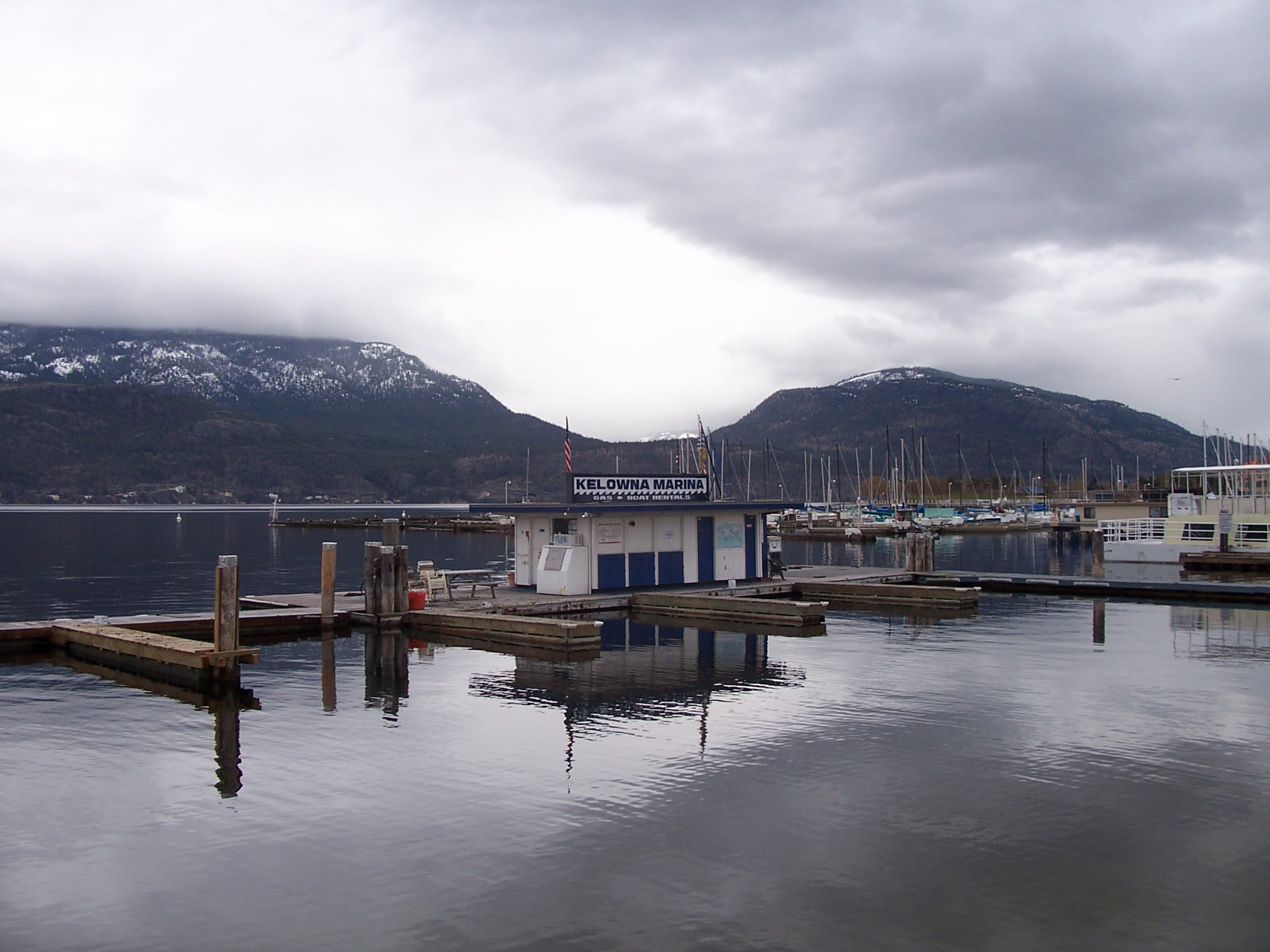
Marina in Downtown Kelowna

- Westbank First Nation
- Kelowna Rockets – Major Junior hockey team in the Western Hockey League (Winners of the 2004 Memorial Cup)
- Kelowna Chiefs – Junior B hockey team in the Kootenay International Junior Hockey League
- Okanagan Independent Film Festival
- Okanagan Sun – Canadian Junior Football League (Winners of the 1988 and 2000 Canadian Bowl)
- Okanagan Challenge – Pacific Coast Soccer League
- Kelowna Falcons – West Coast Collegiate Baseball League
- Okanagan All Stars Hockey Club
- World Community Film Festival

== Education ==
=== Post-secondary ===
- University of British Columbia, Okanagan Campus
- Okanagan College
- Focus College
- Justice Institute of British Columbia (Okanagan Campus)
- Sprott Shaw College (privately owned)
- The Centre for Arts and Technology (privately owned)
- VanWest College (privately owned)

=== Primary and secondary schools ===
Public schools in the Kelowna area are part of School District 23 Central Okanagan. (For a list of primary and middle schools, see the School District 23 Central Okanagan article)

- Secondary (grades 10–12 or 8–12):
  - Kelowna Secondary School (offers French immersion)
  - Rutland Senior Secondary School
  - Mount Boucherie Senior Secondary School
  - Okanagan Mission Secondary School
  - George Elliot Secondary School
  - Central School − Central Programs & Services: Alternative High School

The Conseil scolaire francophone de la Colombie-Britannique operates one Francophone school: école de l'Anse-au-sable primary and secondary school.

==== Private schools ====
- Aberdeen Hall Preparatory School Preparatory School (pre-school, K−12)
- Kelowna Christian School (Pre-12)
- Heritage Christian School (K−12)
- Kelowna Arts Academy (K-12)
- Okanagan Adventist Academy (pre−12)
- Immaculata Regional High School (8–12)
- St. Joseph Elementary (K−7)
- Kelowna Waldorf School (pre−8)
- Okanagan Montessori School (preschool and kindergarten)
- Okanagan Montessori, preschool-grade 6, after-school care
- Willowstone Academy (pre-school, K–9)

=== Public libraries ===
- The Okanagan Regional Library has four branches in Kelowna
  - Kelowna Branch (Downtown)
  - Rutland Branch
  - Mission Branch
  - UBCO Branch

== Crime ==
In February 2009, an RCMP gang task unit was approved to help deal with gang violence.

Most crimes in Kelowna are non-violent property crimes. In 2012, Kelowna had the highest reported crime rate in Canada: 8,875 per 100,000. Police focused on crime in 2014, and Kelowna moved into the number four position across the country.

In 2015, RCMP Superintendent Nick Romanchuk stated, "I am absolutely convinced that as our drug enforcement numbers increase, our overall crime rate will decrease." As of 2016, the crime rate had returned to second highest in Canada. In 2017, the property crime rate in Kelowna went up 6%, once again the highest rate in Canada, while the drug crime rate fell 2%.

In 2013, 446 victims of domestic violence were reported in Kelowna, earning the city the highest per-capita rate of domestic violence in British Columbia and the tenth-highest across Canada. This was a slight drop compared to 2011 when Kelowna reported the fourth-highest rate nationally and led the province in family violence.

In 2014, in Kelowna, there were 251 marijuana charges per 100,000 population, the highest per capita rate in Canada.

In 2012, Kelowna had the highest crime rate of any metropolitan area in Canada, mainly because of its property crime. This increase has, however, been attributed mainly to the actions of a relative few known, prolific offenders. Illicit drug use is high in the region. Between 2012 and 2016, Kelowna led the country in cannabis, cocaine, and heroin possession. As of 2016, the crime rate has declined to second highest. In 2017, Kelowna had the highest opioid overdose rate in Canada.

== Notable people ==
=== Politicians ===
- W. A. C. Bennett, late Premier of British Columbia
- William R. Bennett, served as Premier of the province

=== Military ===
- Charles Thomas, Vice Chief of the Defence Staff

=== Athletes ===
- Steve Bozek, professional ice hockey player
- Aleisha Cline, cross skier, Winter X Games medallist
- Jason Crumb, professional football player
- Mike Crumb, professional football player
- Byron Dafoe, professional ice hockey player
- Scott Frandsen, Olympic rower
- Rob Friend, professional footballer
- Josh Gorges, professional ice hockey player
- Tij Iginla (born 2006), professional ice hockey player
- Darren Jensen, professional ice hockey player
- Conrad Leinemann, Olympic beach volleyball player
- Rory MacDonald, professional Mixed Martial Arts fighter
- Heather Mandoli, Olympic rower
- Axel Merckx, professional road cyclist
- Kees Nierop, professional race car driver
- Taylor Ruck, Olympic swimmer
- Justin Schultz, professional ice hockey player
- Kelsey Serwa, Gold medal Olympic ski cross athlete
- Tyler Shelast, professional ice hockey player
- Kierra Smith, Olympic swimmer
- Paul Spoljaric, professional baseball player
- Ryan Stewart, professional ice hockey player
- Christie Van Hees, professional racquetball player, former US Open & World Champion
- Danny Watkins, professional football player
- Jackson Whistle, professional hockey player
- Ozzy Wiesblatt (born 2002), professional ice hockey player
- Jerod Zaleski, professional football player
- Jeff Zimmerman, professional baseball player
- Jordan Zimmerman, professional baseball player

=== Entertainers ===
- Chad Brownlee, country music artist
- Conro, DJ and producer
- Datsik, DJ and producer
- Ryan Ellsworth, actor
- Excision, DJ and producer
- Jillian Harris, television personality
- Taylor Hickson, actress, singer-songwriter
- Janyse Jaud, actress/singer
- Paul Johansson, actor
- Taylor Kitsch, actor/model
- Shreddy Krueger, post-hardcore band
- Evangeline Lilly, actress/model
- Julie Masi, vocalist, songwriter and musician (The Parachute Club)
- Lauren Glazier, actress
- Twistzz, professional Counter Strike: Global Offensive player for Team Liquid
- Lee Tockar voice actor
- Stutterfly
- Secret & Whisper
- Hudson Williams, actor
- Sarena Parmar, actress

=== Authors ===
- Fern G. Z. Carr
- Melonie Dodaro
- Alix Hawley
- Marcus Kliewer
- Naben Ruthnum
- Jack Whyte

== Sister cities ==
Kelowna has "sister city" agreements with the following cities:

- Kasugai, Aichi, Japan
- Veendam, The Netherlands

== Freedom of the City ==
The following People and Military Units have received the Freedom of the City of Kelowna.

=== Individuals ===
- Brigadier General Harry Herbert "H.H." Angle DSO ED: January 7, 1946.
- Barbara Ann Scott OC OOnt: October 24, 1949.
- The Honourable W. A. C. Bennett PC OC: December 8, 1952.
- George Howard Dunn: April 4, 1955.
- Stanley Merriam Simpson: April 15, 1957.
- William John Knox OBE: January 3, 1961.
- Major General, The Honourable George Randolph Pearkes VC PC CC CB DSO MC CD OD: April 24, 1967.
- Richard Francis "Dick" Parkinson: January 5, 1970.
- Walter Frederick Anderson: September 28, 1981.
- Blair Horn: September 11, 1984.
- The Honourable William Richards "Bill" Bennett PC OBC: November 1, 1988.
- James H. Stuart: July 1, 2001.
- Benjamin "Ben" Lee: July 1, 2001.
- Senator, The Honourable D. Ross Fitzpatrick OBC: May 26, 2008.
- Walter Gray: April 25, 2015.
- Andre Blanleil: April 25, 2015.
- Robert Hobson: April 25, 2015.

=== Military Units ===
- The British Columbia Dragoons: February 11, 1963.

== See also ==
- Orchard Park Shopping Centre
- Sunshine tax
- The Daily Courier
- WT Small House
- Tallest buildings in Kelowna
