= Little White Mountain =

Mountain in Canada

- Little White in early spring, as seen from Okanagan Lake

Highest point
- Elevation: 2,171 m (7,123 ft)
- Prominence: 804 m (2,638 ft)
- Coordinates: 49°41′16″N 119°19′55″W

Geography
- Location within British Columbia
- Location: British Columbia, Canada
- District: Similkameen Division Yale Land District
- Topo map: NTS 82E11 Wilkinson Creek

Little White Mountain is a mountain near the city of Kelowna, British Columbia, Canada, near the central Okanagan Valley. The mountain stands an elevation of 2,171 meters (or 7,123 feet). It is a significant destination for backcountry recreation, with backcountry skiing, snowshoeing and snowmobiling opportunities. The BC parks website describes it as, "...one of the most attractive sub-alpine areas in the Okanagan and is a significant destination for backcountry recreation. The forested south slopes provide extensive hiking opportunities at the urban interface." The site goes on to say that "Little White Mountain provides backcountry skiing and snowshoeing opportunities".

There are snowmobiling opportunities in the park. Snowmobiles can use the KVR and Little White Mountain when "snow depth precludes environmental damage."

== Gallery ==
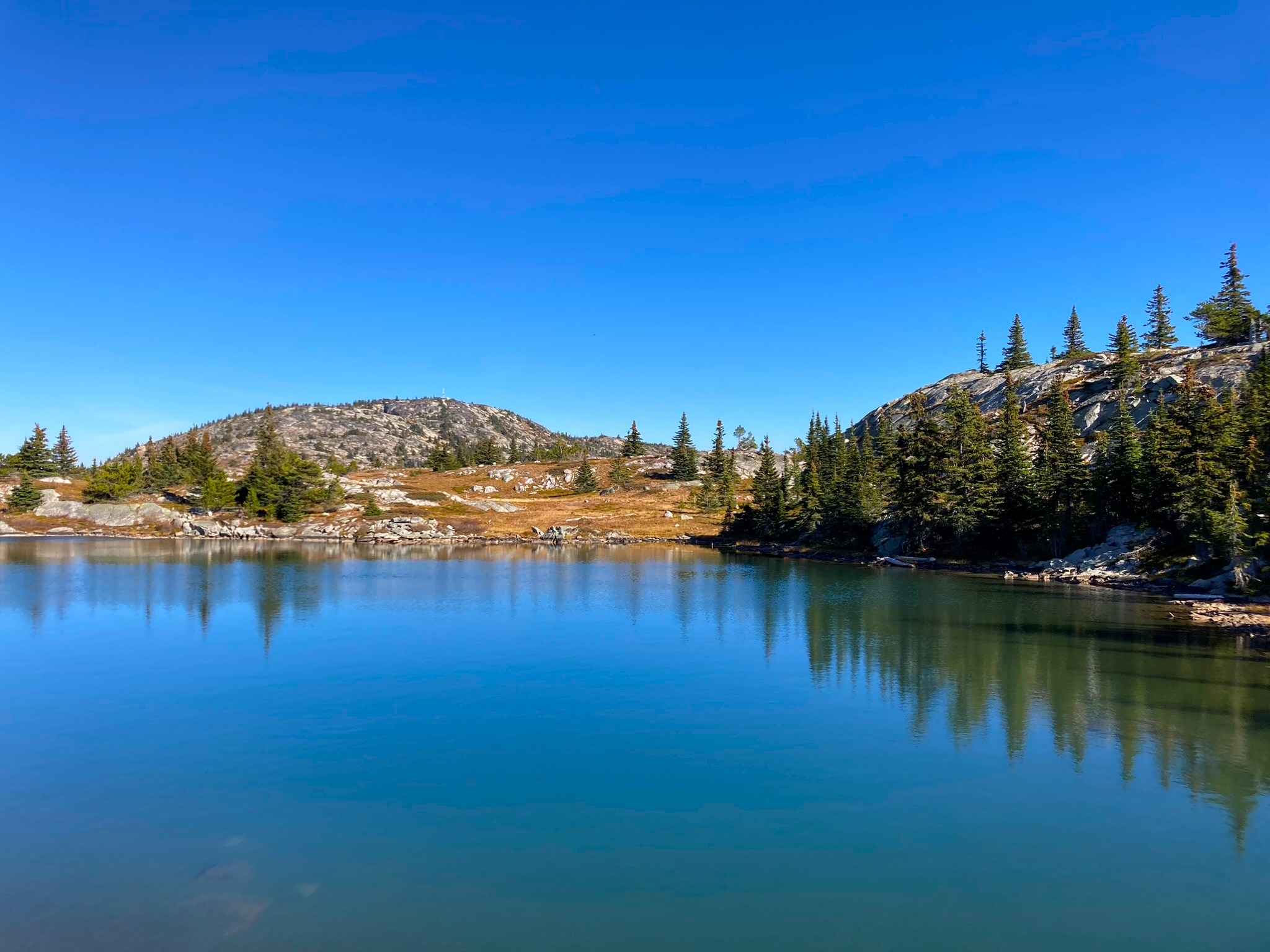
Little White in late fall, viewed from Crawford Lake
