= Father Pandosy =

French Catholic priest (1824-1891)

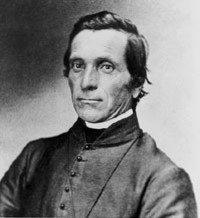
- Jean-Charles-Jean-Baptiste-Félix Pandosy
- Born: 22 November 1824; Marseille, Provence-Alpes-Côte d'Azur, France
- Died: 6 February 1891 (aged 66); Penticton, British Columbia, Canada
- Occupation: Priest
- Known for: Founding the Okanagan Mission, First Settler in the Kelowna Area in British Columbia.

Jean-Charles-Jean-Baptiste-Félix Pandosy (22 November 1824 – c. 6 February 1891), commonly known as Father Pandosy, was a French Catholic priest who was the first settler in the Kelowna area in British Columbia. He set up a church and a school and attracted many settlers to the area. He founded the Okanagan Mission which was the first permanent white settlement in the British Columbia Interior aside from the forts for the Hudson's Bay Company and the gold rush boomtowns of the Fraser Canyon.

== Background ==
Father Pandosy was born on 22 November 1824 in Marseille, France, to Esprit-Étienne-Charles-Henri Pandosy, a sea captain, and Marguerite-Josephine-Marie Dallest. He was educated at Collège de Bourbon in Arles. He then decided to enter the Oblate Juniorate of Notre-Dame de Lumières. On 14 August 1844, he entered the novitiate of the Missionary Oblates of Mary Immaculate (O.M.I.) at Notre-Dame-de-l'Osier and took his vows one year and one day later, on 15 August 1845. After that, he studied philosophy and theology at the seminary in Marseille.

Towards the end of 1846, Eugène de Mazenod, the founder of the O.M.I., granted the request of two Pacific Northwest bishops (Augustin-Magloire Blanchet of Walla Walla, Washington and Modeste Demers of Vancouver Island) to send Oblate missionaries from France to serve in their dioceses. Pandosy and 4 other men (one ordained priest, three scholastics, of which Pandosy was one, and one lay brother) left Le Havre on 4 February 1847 when Pandosy was 23 years old. They arrived in New York on 2 April 1847, met Bishop Blanchet in St. Louis and reached Kansas City on 1 May 1847. They then joined a caravan going to Fort Hall in what is now southeastern Idaho. When the party arrived at Fort Hall the Bishop and a few companions went ahead to prepare lodgings and provisions for the winter. Father Pandosy remained with the wagons in Fort Hall and finally arrived in Walla Walla on 5 October 1847, eight months after he had set out from France.

== Work in Oregon Territory ==
Father Pandosy and the other Oblates began by proselytizing the Yakama people in the lower valley of the Yakima River. While they were there, the Whitman Massacre occurred near Walla Walla. The Bishop decided to immediately ordain two of the Oblates, Pandosy and Father Eugene Chirouse. Pandosy was ordained into the priesthood on 2 January 1848. Father Pandosy then returned to the Yakama Indians, and convinced them to stay neutral in the Cayuse War which broke out after the massacre.

Pandosy and Chirouse befriended Chief Kamiakin of the Yakama people and he protected them for many years. In early 1849 the two priests built the Mission of St. Joseph at Saralpes. In 1851 he was joined by Father Louis-Joseph d'Herbomez and they moved the mission to the Ahtanum Creek. This was near Kamiakin’s camp.

The Yakima War broke out in 1855. Volunteer soldiers went into the field to fight against the Indians. Some of these volunteers took the St. Joseph Mission and uncovered a keg of powder, leading them to believe that the priests were helping the Yakama. The mission was burned and Father Pandosy was forced to flee with the Yakama. He escaped from them and managed to find his way to the Jesuits’ St. Paul's Mission at Kettle Falls. He stayed there until the middle of 1856, then spent the rest of 1856 and 1857 ministering to the Indians and US troops in that area. In 1858, he was transferred to Esquimalt, which was then the headquarters of the Oblates in British Columbia.

== Okanagan Mission ==
In 1858, Father Pandosy and the missionaries arrived in Esquimalt in the summer. Father Pandosy wanted to start a new colony in the Interior and he chose the Okanagan area. He started looking for people to join him. French-Canadian brothers, Theodore and Cyprien Laurence, Cyprien's wife Therese who was a member of the Flathead tribe and an unnamed Flathead man joined Father Pandosy and set off for the Okanagan. In the fall of 1859 they arrived in the Okanagan and settled down. However, in the spring it became too marshy so they moved to a spot near modern-day Mission Creek that summer. They built a small log home with a church on the ground floor and they slept upstairs. They called it Immaculate Conception Mission and it was located on the site they called L'Anse au Sable (Sandy Cove). Father Pandosy's Mission is commonly called Okanagan Mission. The site was not established for fur or gold but rather as a religious site and community settlement. Father Pandosy was just as much a farmer as he was a priest. Okanagan Mission had hogs, sheep, oats, barley, wheat, tobacco and potatoes. Father Pandosy's Mission was the first cemetery, the first place of worship and the first school in the Southern Interior. Two years after it was founded, 121 people were baptized at Okanagan Mission. In 1865, a brother's house was added to the site to house the many priests that stayed there as they were passing through as well as travelers who needed a place to stay. In 1866, a log barn was added to the site. Father Pandosy farmed and found ways to irrigate the land so a root cellar was also built. In 1882, a new sawn lumber church was added. This new church had five Gothic style windows and a bell tower. A bell that was given to Father Pandosy by Joseph Chretien hung in the tower of the new church. Father Pandosy served in missions across British Columbia and sometimes he would stay away for years at a time but he always came back to Okanagan Mission. Okanagan Mission became the Catholic Church's headquarters for the area. However, in 1885, after the completion of the Canadian Pacific Railway's new transcontinental line, the oblates switched their headquarters to St. Louis Mission in Kamloops.

During his service in British Columbia, he established other missions, including one on Harbledown Island in 1863 which was later closed by Bishop D'Herbomez in 1874. Louis d'Herbomez built mission with him in 1847, in Washington near Yakima, which was named Sainte Croix. Location was main summer camp for Chief Kamiakin

== Death ==
In February 1891, Father Pandosy was called to Keremeos. He was 67 years old and in tentative health. Returning from Keremeos, he made it as far as Penticton and was very ill. Chief Françoise of the Penticton Indian Band noticed Father Pandosy's illness and took him in. Thomas Ellis' wife was called because of her nursing skills. Little could be done for Father Pandosy and he died on February 6, 1891. His body was sent back to Okanagan Mission on the steamer Penticton. He was buried across the street from the site he founded. The Pandosy Mission Cemetery containing Father Pandosy's grave was discovered by a team of archeologists from Vancouver in 1983. The dig also discovered the graves of several early settlers pre-1900. The site is marked by a granite boulder with a commemorative brass plaque and is located on a working farm about 400 metres north-west from the mission.

== Legacy ==
In 1896, Okanagan Mission was sold to Father Eumelin. Father Eumelin ran the Mission until 1902. Father Pandosy's Mission closed in 1902 and the land was purchased by the Kelowna Land and Orchard Company. Father Pandosy's Mission had been a place of worship for forty-four years. 1947 saw the property sold again and it was slated for demolition but a group of volunteers rescued and restored the three original buildings on the site. Father Pandosy's original sawn wood church was sold to a local congregation and they moved the church to their site in Rutland where it was later destroyed by fire. The Oblates of Mary Immaculate bought the two acres that held the original buildings in 1954. In 1983, the site was designated as a B.C. Heritage Site. Father Pandosy's Mission is now four acres and other historic buildings have been put on site.

Father Pandosy's legacy has been memorialized in a street name in Kelowna, B.C. and the MV Pendozi car and passenger ferry, that connected Kelowna and West Kelowna from 1939 to 1958. Interestingly, both instances incorrectly spell the priest's name as "Pendozi".
