= Melonie Dodaro =

Canadian social media expert, author and entrepreneur

- Born: Melonie Dodaro; 19 January 1969 (age 57); Toronto, Ontario, Canada
- Occupations: Social media expert; author; entrepreneur
- Organization: Top Dog Social Media
- Notable work: "The LinkedIn Code" and "Linkedin Unlocked"
- Website: topdogsocialmedia.com linkedinunlockedbook.com

Melonie Dodaro Canadian entrepreneur, author, and social media marketing consultant. She is the founder and CEO of Top Dog Social Media, and gained media attention in 2015 after using social media platforms to locate her biological father, whom she had not previously met.

== Biography ==
Originally from Canada, Dodaro now lives in Amsterdam. In 2017, she became a dual citizen of the United Kingdom.

Dodaro began her entrepreneurial career in the weight-loss industry, operating franchise locations in Canada during the late 1990s and early 2000s. In 2007, she co-founded Life Success Perfect Weight with motivational speaker Bob Proctor. In 2010, she founded Top Dog Social Media, a social media marketing consulting company.

A digital marketing consultant and speaker, she has been included on industry rankings and influencer lists and written for industry publications including Social Media Today, Canadian Business Journal, and Social Media Examiner.

Dodaro had never met her biological father until she launched a social media campaign that received widespread media attention in 2015. After numerous fruitless attempts to find him, she started a hashtag campaign on Twitter using #FindCeesDeJong along with her story posted as a Facebook video. She had very limited information about him, only his name, age and place of birth. The task of finding him was quite difficult given that her father had a common name. Two Netherlands-based newspaper journalists working for de Stentor were able to help find her father after her video received over 30,000 views.

== Books ==
- The MindBody FX Lifestyle. New York: Morgan James. 2010. OCLC 827780788.
- The LinkedIn Code. Kelowna, British Columbia: Top Dog Social Media. 2014. OCLC 950461118.
