= Knox Mountain Hillclimb =

Motorsport hillclimb in Kelowna, British Columbia

- Location: Knox Mountain Park, Kelowna, British Columbia, Canada; 49°54′18″N 119°29′33″W
- First race: 1956 (Okanagan Hillclimb); 1966 (current course)
- Distance: 3.5 km (2.2 mi)

Circuit information
- Surface: Asphalt concrete
- Turns: 9
- Lap record: 1:34.903 (Aran Cook, Arco X10, 2023)

The Knox Mountain Hillclimb is an annual automobile hillclimb in the Okanagan Valley of British Columbia. Established in 1956 as the Okanagan Hillclimb and operating on a paved course in Kelowna's Knox Mountain Park since 1966, it is among the longest-running annual hillclimbs in North America and the only sanctioned hillclimb in Canada. The 3.5-kilometre (2.2 mi) course is known for its difficulty, with every corner cambered to the outside of the curve as it climbs 245 metres (800 ft) for an average grade of 6.7%.

The hillclimb takes place in May, on the Saturday and Sunday before Victoria Day. It is organized by Knox Mountain Motor Sport (KMMS), an affiliate of the Confederation of Autosport Car Clubs (CACC), the Fédération Internationale de l'Automobile (FIA) sanctioning authority for British Columbia. The course record is 1:34.903 set by Aran Cook in 2023.

== Course ==
Located within Knox Mountain Park, a 385-hectare (950-acre) nature park overlooking Kelowna's downtown core, the course follows 3.5 kilometres (2.2 mi) of Knox Mountain Drive. (Note: Knox Mountain Drive is sometimes referred to as Knox Mountain Parkway, Knox Mountain Park Road or simply Knox Mountain Road.) It climbs 245 metres (800 ft) for an average grade of 6.7%, and has nine turns including three hairpin turns. It is Canada's oldest hillclimb and the country's only sanctioned hillclimb. It is promoted as the longest-running annual paved hillclimb in North America though this distinction may be contested by the Mount Equinox Hillclimb in Vermont. (Note: The Mount Equinox Hillclimb is the second-oldest hillclimb in the United States (after Pikes Peak). It was first raced in 1950. Its private road, Skyline Drive, was fully paved in 1953. It became an official Sports Car Club of America SCCA event and in 1973 sanctioning was taken over by the Vintage Sports Car Club of America (VSCCA). As it has only allowed vintage cars for the majority of its existence, Mount Equinox may not be considered a fully sanctioned event.)

The road was originally built as a mountain access road and designed not for speed but for drainage of rain and meltwater. The course is unique in the Pacific Northwest for being paved with all the corners cambered toward the outside of the curve, making it very difficult to complete a corner at high speed. The narrow road is flanked by rock outcroppings, cliffs and mature trees. While the posted speed limit is 30 kilometres per hour (19 mph), top racers will exceed 160 km/h (99 mph) on the short straight sections.

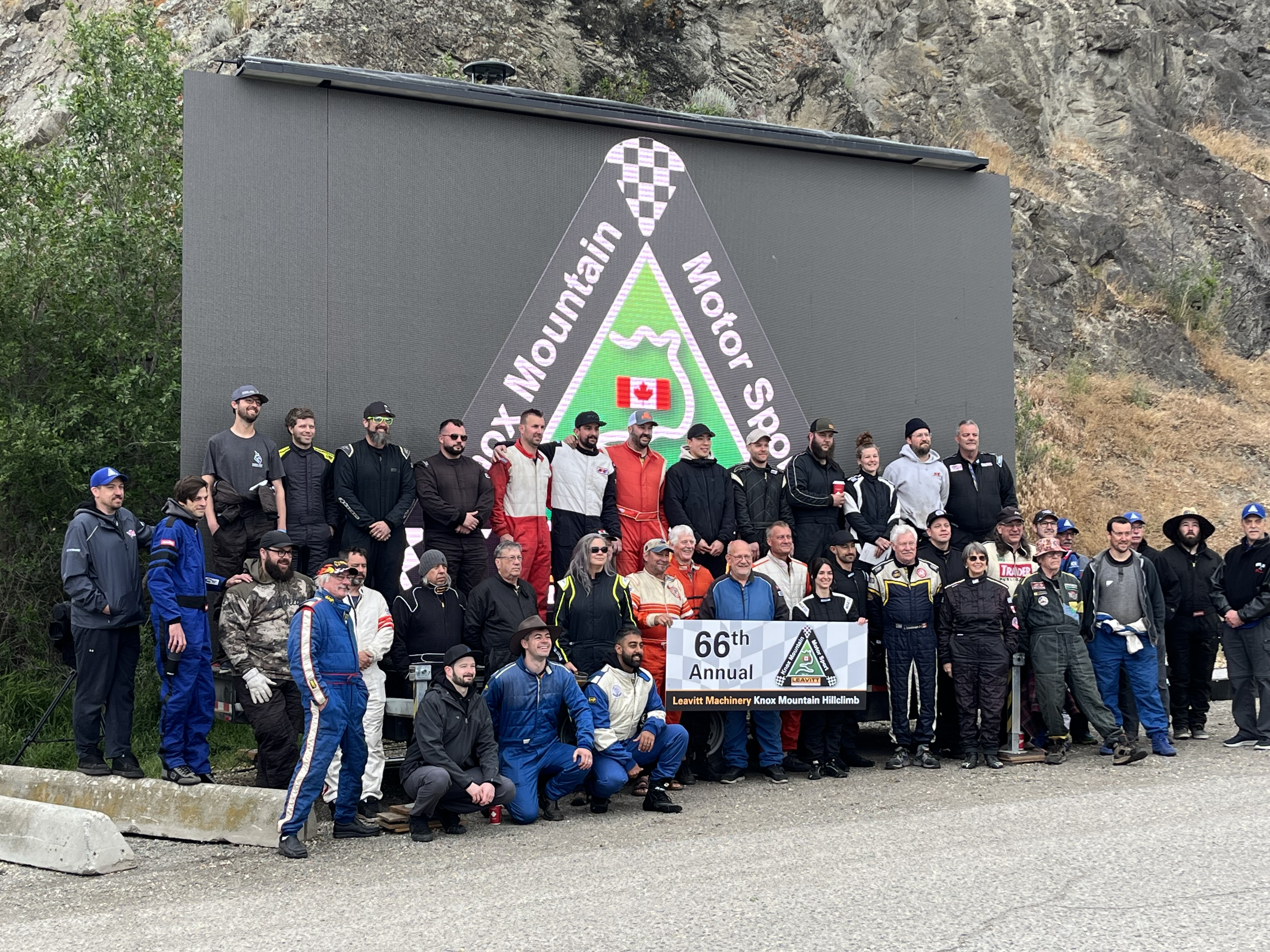
Drivers pose for a group photo at the conclusion of the 2025 hillclimb.

The hillclimb can host up to 90 drivers, who must have racing licenses and safety equipment installed in their vehicles. Drivers race one at a time, competing in classes which include open-wheel cars, grand tourer (GT), vintage cars, four-wheel drive, engines under 1800cc, dune buggies, and electric cars. The fastest time across all classes is named "King of the Hill". Times under two minutes are considered exceptionally fast and as of 2023 only 14 drivers had completed the course in under one minute and fifty seconds. That year, the hill record of 1:34.903 was set by Aran Cook.

The course is considered to be very challenging. In 1969, Prince George Citizen sports editor Ron Allerton called Knox Mountain "the most perfect paved track ... available for hillclimb in North America." In 1973, Hot Rod magazine described the Knox Mountain Hillclimb as the "premiere event" in Western Canada and "one of the nation's top amateur events". According to National Solo Sport Representative Henry Threlfall, Knox is CACC's biggest annual solo autoracing event. American racer George Bowland, who held records at ten hillclimbs, said that Knox was the best-run hillclimb he'd attended, "the best from all standpoints, from the management of it to the challenge of the hill itself."

Knox Mountain Drive is closed annually due to poor winter driving conditions from the first frost warning in November until March or April. Additionally, the road is typically closed in the summer due to wildfire risks. During the COVID-19 pandemic, Knox Mountain Drive was closed to automobiles entirely to allow social distancing in the park. (Note: Knox Mountain Drive was closed to automobiles for COVID-19 social distancing measures, to allow hikers and bicyclists to travel up Knox Mountain Park's Apex Trail and down the narrow road.) Since 2022, with hikers and bicyclists competing for safe road use, the narrow road has only been open to automobiles to the third turn (allowing access to the park's lower lookout pavilion). Due to these closures, racers can only drive the full course on race days and must otherwise walk or bicycle to survey the upper half of the course.

Other sporting events have also used Knox Mountain Drive. In road cycling, it has been used as the K-Town Classic's first stage, also called the Knox Mountain hill climb, with top riders earning points toward the BC Cup. (Note: The K-Town Classic was the only BC Cup competition outside of the Lower Mainland. Its following stages were the Winfield Criterium and the East Kelowna road race.) In 2008, it brought 175 riders for the three-day event, with the fastest ascent at 9:00. Provincial championships in cyclo-cross have been held elsewhere in Knox Mountain Park. In downhill skateboarding and street luge, it has been used as the Knox Mountain Downhill, co-hosted by the Kelowna Longboard Alliance and the Kamloops Longboard Club. It is sanctioned by Skateboard Canada as a qualifier for the national teams.

== History ==
The Okanagan Auto Sport Club (OASC) held its first hill climb, called the Okanagan Hill Climb, in Penticton in 1956 on Crescent Hill Road. From 1957 to 1960 the hillclimb was held in Westbank, with a 1.8-kilometre (1.1 mi) course starting at Okanagan Lake. The 1961 event was cancelled as the road was repaired and realigned, which reduced its driving challenge and appeal as a course. From 1962 to 1965 the Okanagan Hill Climb was held in Okanagan Centre on Camp Road (Note: Some sources note the Okanagan Centre event being held in the larger adjacent community of Winfield or the municipality of Lake Country which encompasses both communities.) with a course of slightly over 1.6 km (1 mi). Held in May on the Saturday and Sunday before Victoria Day, the event became popular in the Pacific Northwest and, attracting crowds in the thousands, grew too large for the Okanagan Centre community to support.

For the 1966 hillclimb, the OASC was granted permission to use the newly paved road on Knox Mountain in Kelowna. Immediate benefits included all-day radio coverage of events on CKOV and videotaping by CHBC television. Popularity reached its peak in the early 1970s, drawing several thousand spectators, and the race attracted sponsors Castrol oil and Macdonald Tobacco to provide cash prizes. British Columbia then led solo auto racing in Canada: in 1973 the province hosted thirty sanctioned solo events including four hillclimbs and in 1974 BC drivers took the top seven places at the Sports Car Club of America (SCCA) championships.

In January 2005, Knox Mountain Motor Sport (KMMS) was incorporated in British Columbia under the Society Act. (Note: While sometimes referred to as the Knox Mountain Motorsport Society, KMMS was incorporated as Knox Mountain Motor Sport under the Society Act of British Columbia.) KMMS took over the organization of the Knox Mountain Hillclimb while OASC continued other motorsport events in the Okanagan. Residential development and municipal regulations had resulted in the discontinuation of other hillclimbs in Canada, such as that at Rattlesnake Point on Ontario's Niagara Escarpment. By the mid-2010s, Knox Mountain was the only sanctioned hillclimb in Canada.

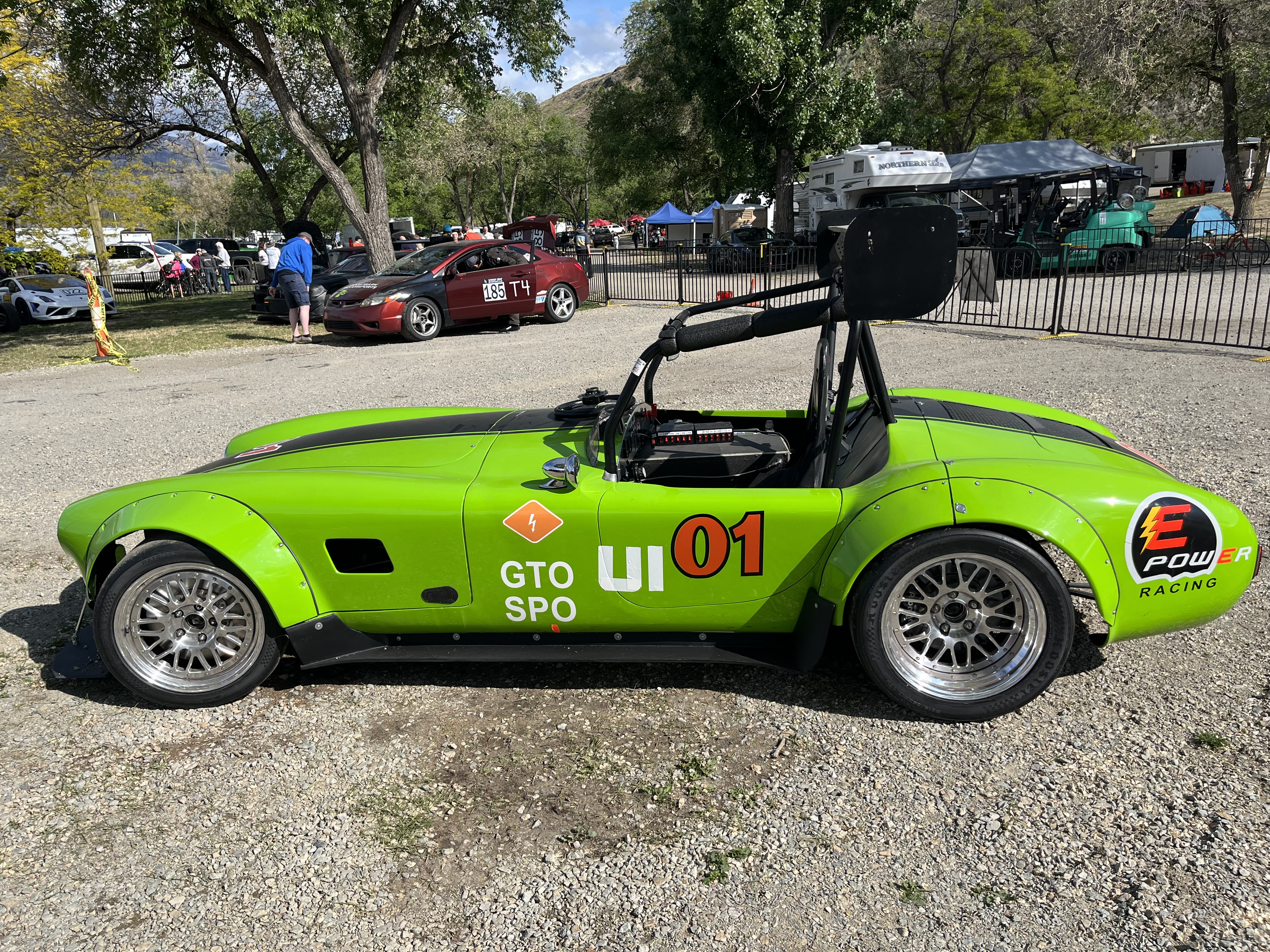
The first electric vehicle to win the hillclimb was this heavily modified AC Cobra EV driven by Trevor Yip in 2025.

Five drivers from North American Big Rig Racing took to the course as the second event of the 2004 NABRR Tour, racing Kenworth, Mack and Peterbuilt trucks. This did not become a regular category of the hillclimb. The first electric car to compete in the race was entered by University of British Columbia engineering students in 2015. In 2018, KMMS started a Queen of the Hill competition to recognize female racers, prompting the CACC to take steps to encourage female racers to participate in other disciplines. A record of six women drivers took to the course in 2023.

In the 2020s, the SCCA classification system was phased in. The race experienced a two-year hiatus due to COVID-19 restrictions. In 2024, a video wall was added at the bottom of the hill with the race livestreamed.

== Organization ==
The hillclimb is organized by Knox Mountain Motor Sport (KMMS), an affiliate of the Confederation of Autosport Car Clubs (CACC), the Fédération Internationale de l'Automobile (FIA) sanctioning authority for British Columbia. In 2016, KMMS had 12 non-racing members and 50–60 members who were also racers at the event. A minimum of 40 volunteers are needed over the race weekend as track workers, tow truck operators and gate workers.

On the race weekend there is also a small car show, beer garden, food trucks, children's play areas, and live music. As KMMS is a non-profit organization, proceeds are reinvested into the event or distributed to local charities such as the Kelowna Society for the Prevention of Cruelty to Animals, Sunshine Dreams for Kids, and Kids Cancer Care. KMMS has also partnered with the City of Kelowna to plant thousands of trees in the park to replace those killed by pine beetles.

Other groups planning to hold hillclimbs have consulted with KMMS and volunteered at the event to gain operational experience. KMMS has also organized ice racing on Duck Lake and Swan Lake in the Okanagan, ice conditions permitting, (Note: Lake ice must be a minimum of 30 cm (12 in) thick for racing.) in January and February.

== Race records ==
The title of King of the Hill is awarded to the driver with the fastest time up the hill across all categories. John Haftner won the title twelve times between 1989 and 2012, setting course records on five of those occasions and holding the course record for 24 years. Other prominent racers include Wouter Bouman (three titles; four years under 1:50), Bryan Evans (four titles; held course record for 11 years), Allen Reid (four titles), Ian Wood (four titles), and Jennifer Ocker (five Queen of the Hill titles).

The first ten editions of the race, before the 3.5 km Knox Mountain course was adopted, are presented on a separate table.

Edition	Year	Location	King of the Hill		Ref
Edition	Year	Location	Driver	Car	Ref
1	1956	Crescent Hill Road, Penticton	Denny Crees	Triumph	
2	1957	Westbank	Tom Luce	Corvette	
3	1958	Westbank	Tom Luce	Corvette	
4	1959	Westbank	Tom Luce	Corvette	
5	1960	Westbank	Bob Symonds	Porsche 1600cc	
–	1961	Cancelled due to road construction			
6	1962	Camp Road, Okanagan Centre	Bert Gibb	Austin Healey 3000 MkII	
7	1963	Camp Road, Okanagan Centre	Terry Hearnden	XK 150S Jaguar	
8	1964	Camp Road, Okanagan Centre	Bob McLean	Cooper Formula Junior	
9	1965	Camp Road, Okanagan Centre	Laurie Craig	Corvette	
10	1966	Knox Mountain Drive (3.4 km), Kelowna	Dave Ogilvy	Cooper Formula Junior	

Edition	Year	King of the Hill			Ref
Edition	Year	Driver	Car	Time	Ref
10	1967	Dave Ogilvy	Cooper Formula Junior	2:08.150	
11	1968	John Randall	Brabham BT8	2:03.789	
12	1969	Ray Smith	Brabham BT16	1:59.029	
13	1970	John Randall	Brabham BT8	1:59.986	
14	1971	John Hall	Ford Mustang	2:01.029	
15	1972	Jerry Olsen	McLaren	1:59.815	
16	1973	Dave Morris	Formula Ford	1:59.268	
17	1974	Bryan Evans	Formula Ford	1:59.600	
18	1975	David Saville-Peck	Costello Leyland	1:54.899	
19	1976	Doug Lorraine	Formula Ford	2:00.404	
20	1977	Bryan Evans	Johnson JM 2b	1:55.768	
21	1978	Bryan Evans	Johnson JM 2b	1:52.344	
22	1979	Rob McGregor	Chevron Spyder	1:53.651	
23	1980	Bryan Evans	Johnson JM 3b	1:50.002	
24	1981	John Haftner	Dunebuggy	1:58.040	
25	1982	Keith Gray	March Super V	1:51.729	
26	1983	Ian Wood	March 73 S	1:55.668	
27	1984	Ian Wood	March 73 S	1:57.644	
28	1985	Floyd Schrammick	Lotus FF	1:52.182	
29	1986	Ian Wood	March 73 S	1:55.996	
30	1987	Tom Meyers	Chevron B 27	1:55.280	
31	1988	Michael Elliott	Zink	1:52.986	
32	1989	John Haftner	Tui Super V	1:48.624	
33	1990	John Haftner	Tui Super V	1:46.893	
34	1991	Richard Chong	Lotus MR7	1:54.947	
35	1992	Greg Mandrusiak	Ralt RT4	1:50.105	
36	1993	Greg Mandrusiak	Ralt RT4	1:49.997	
37	1994	John Haftner	Tui Super V	1:41.182	
38	1995	John Haftner	Tui Super V	1:38.969	
39	1996	Lawrie Watters	Dulon DL9	1:56.182	
40	1997	John Haftner	Tui Super V	1:39.971	
41	1998	Kenny Richins	Griffin Super V	1:51.336	
42	1999	Kenny Richins	Griffin Super V	1:52.437	
43	2000	Richard Chong	Mondail	1:56.484	
44	2001	Allen Reid	MGB GT	1:54.312	
45	2002	John Haftner	Tui Super V	1:41.248	
46	2003	Allen Reid	68 MGB GT V8	1:52.349	
47	2004	John Haftner	Tui Super V	1:41.612	
48	2005	John Haftner	Tui Super V	1:39.992	
49	2006	John Haftner	Tui Super V	1:41.972	
50	2007	John Haftner	1973 Tui Super V	1:37.065	
51	2008	Ian Wood	Rawlson CR11 Can-Am	1:48.570	
52	2009	Allen Reid	MGB GT	1:52.616	
53	2010	Allen Reid	MGB GT	1:56.016	
54	2011	George Bowland	custom FA	1:42.888	
55	2012	John Haftner		1:41.694	
56	2013	Josh Vanderkerklova	Tube-framed Rabbit	1:54.661	
57	2014	Yarko Petriw	Formula Ford	1:51.710	
58	2015	Wouter Bouman		1:48.344	
59	2016	Wouter Bouman	Mazda RX7	1:49.028	
60	2017	Wouter Bouman	Mazda RX7	1:47.693	
61	2018	Andre Marziali	BMW M3	1:50.040	
62	2019	Aran Cook	Arco X10	1:45.311	
–	2020	Cancelled due to Covid-19 restrictions			
–	2021	Cancelled due to Covid-19 restrictions			
63	2022	Mark Uhlmann	Stohr WF	1:39.989	
64	2023	Aran Cook	Arco X10	1:34.903	
65	2024	Darren Graham	Nissan GTR	1:46.560	
66	2025	Trevor Yip	Tesla Cobra EV	1:46.121	
67	2026	Roger Sieber	Hayaboostacar Roadster	1:48.403	

To 2006, only five drivers had completed the course in under one minute and fifty seconds. By 2023, this group had grown to fourteen members. Roughly half of these drivers have bested 1:50 in multiple years. (Note: Half of the drivers who have finished the Knox Mountain course in less than 1:50 have done so in multiple editions of the event. The following are the years that drivers bested 1:50, in addition to their personal best times: Greg Mandrusiak in 1993; John Haftner in 1994; Haftner and Mandrusiak in 1997; Haftner in 2002, 2004, 2005 and 2006; Ian Wood in 2007; Haftner in 2012; Wouter Bouman in 2015, 2016 and 2017; Aran Cook in 2019; Darren Graham and Roger Sieber in 2023; Sieber in 2024; and Andre Marziali and Sieber in 2025.) The fastest podium groups, in which all three drivers had broken 1:50, were in 1994, 2002, 2019, 2023, 2025 and 2026.

Driver	Fastest Run			Additional Years Under 1:50	Ref
Driver	Car	Time	Year	Additional Years Under 1:50	Ref
Aran Cook	Arco X10	1:34.903	2023	1	
John Haftner	1973 Tui Super V	1:37.065	2007	7	
Mark Uhlmann	Stohr WF1	1:39.989	2022		
George Bowland	custom	1:42.888	2011		
Joe Cheng	FA-class Phantom Special	1:43.834	2002		
Bobby Unser	Ralt RT4	1:44.656	1994		
Greg Mandrusiak	Ralt RT4	1:45.610	1994	2	
Trevor Yip	Tesla Cobra EV	1:46.121	2025		
Darren Graham	Nissan GTR 2009	1:46.560	2024	1	
Wouter Bouman	Mazda RX7	1:47.214	2019	3	
Andre Marziali	BMW M3	1:48.316	2019	1	
Roger Sieber	Hayaboostacar Roadster	1:48.403	2026	3	
Ian Wood	1972 Rawlson CR11 Can-Am	1:48.570	2008	1	
Carl Marcum	Mitsubishi Lancer	1:48.665	2025		
Basil Santamaria	Honda Civic Si	1:48.965	2026		
Aaron Nijjar	Subaru WRX STI	1:49.391	2026		
Allen Reid	MGB GT	1:49.704	2004		
Kees Nierop	Reynard Formula Ford 2000	1:49.989	2002		

Key: Light goldenrod cells indicate the fastest time for that year, i.e.: a King of the Hill title. Green cells indicate a course record and King of the Hill title.
