= Winfield, British Columbia =

Winfield
- Neighbourhood
- Location of Winfield Winfield (Canada)
- Coordinates: 50°01′45″N 119°24′16″W
- Country: Canada
- Province: British Columbia
- Regional district: Central Okanagan
- District: Lake Country

Population
  - Total: 9,100
- Time zone: UTC−08:00 (PST)
  - Summer (DST): UTC−07:00 (PDT)

Winfield is a neighbourhood and formal ward within the District Municipality of Lake Country, British Columbia, located adjacent to the northern city boundary of Kelowna.

The community, formerly an unincorporated settlement, is now one of the four wards of Lake Country. It is situated to the north and slightly east of Kelowna, along Highway 97, in the central part of the Okanagan region. The town is adjacent to Wood Lake, which attracts summer visitors. The economy is based on light manufacturing, fruit producing and tourism, in addition to being a bedroom community for Kelowna.

== History ==
Formerly known as Alvaston, it was renamed Winfield after Winfield Lodge, the home of Thomas Wood, justice of the peace and rancher who settled in the area in 1871.

In 1968 Winfield and district minor hockey was founded along with the opening of the new arena.

In the 1960s Winfield Foods, which was changed to IGA in 1972, was the only grocery store in Winfield till Save on Foods opened in 1999 as part of the Winfield Commons project. [Winfield had another grocery store through the 1970s and 80s in the Lakewood Mall.]

In 1995, Winfield, along with the neighbouring communities of Oyama, Carr's Landing and Okanagan Centre, was incorporated into the District Municipality of Lake Country.

== Education ==
The area has four public schools, Davidson Road Elementary School (opened 1983), Peter Greer Elementary School (opened 1992), George Elliot Secondary School (opened 1959), and Hank Grenda Middle School (opened 2021), and one traditional school, Oyama Traditional School, an elementary school where uniforms are worn which operates in the public school system. The schools in the area are operated by School District 23 Central Okanagan based in Kelowna. The schools in the municipality that are no longer open include Winfield Elementary, Woodlake Elementary, and Okanagan Centre Elementary (a small school house that later became the Lake Country Museum and Archives). In the 1980s, most grade 5 students attending Wood Lake Elementary were bused daily to Okanagan Centre Elementary which had two classrooms.

== Climate ==
Climate data for Winfield
Month	Jan	Feb	Mar	Apr	May	Jun	Jul	Aug	Sep	Oct	Nov	Dec	Year
Record high °C (°F)	14.0 (57.2)	15.0 (59.0)	20.5 (68.9)	28.0 (82.4)	33.0 (91.4)	36.5 (97.7)	38.0 (100.4)	38.5 (101.3)	33.5 (92.3)	25.0 (77.0)	19.4 (66.9)	13.0 (55.4)	38.5 (101.3)
Mean daily maximum °C (°F)	0.4 (32.7)	3.1 (37.6)	9.3 (48.7)	14.8 (58.6)	19.5 (67.1)	23.2 (73.8)	26.8 (80.2)	26.5 (79.7)	20.6 (69.1)	12.5 (54.5)	4.8 (40.6)	0.1 (32.2)	13.5 (56.3)
Daily mean °C (°F)	−1.9 (28.6)	0.0 (32.0)	4.7 (40.5)	9.2 (48.6)	13.5 (56.3)	17.2 (63.0)	20.3 (68.5)	20.1 (68.2)	14.9 (58.8)	8.4 (47.1)	2.3 (36.1)	−2.0 (28.4)	8.9 (48.0)
Mean daily minimum °C (°F)	−4.1 (24.6)	−3.2 (26.2)	0.0 (32.0)	3.6 (38.5)	7.4 (45.3)	11.1 (52.0)	13.6 (56.5)	13.7 (56.7)	9.1 (48.4)	4.2 (39.6)	−0.3 (31.5)	−4.1 (24.6)	4.3 (39.7)
Record low °C (°F)	−25.0 (−13.0)	−22.5 (−8.5)	−17.8 (0.0)	−5.6 (21.9)	−2.5 (27.5)	2.8 (37.0)	5.0 (41.0)	6.0 (42.8)	−1.7 (28.9)	−16.0 (3.2)	−27.0 (−16.6)	−27.5 (−17.5)	−27.5 (−17.5)
Average precipitation mm (inches)	34.7 (1.37)	20.9 (0.82)	21.2 (0.83)	28.1 (1.11)	37.9 (1.49)	41.7 (1.64)	33.1 (1.30)	27.7 (1.09)	30.3 (1.19)	28.7 (1.13)	39.2 (1.54)	38.7 (1.52)	382.0 (15.04)
Average rainfall mm (inches)	7.5 (0.30)	9.5 (0.37)	16.0 (0.63)	27.5 (1.08)	37.9 (1.49)	41.7 (1.64)	33.1 (1.30)	27.7 (1.09)	30.3 (1.19)	28.2 (1.11)	24.3 (0.96)	7.2 (0.28)	290.8 (11.45)
Average snowfall cm (inches)	27.2 (10.7)	11.4 (4.5)	5.2 (2.0)	0.6 (0.2)	0.0 (0.0)	0.0 (0.0)	0.0 (0.0)	0.0 (0.0)	0.0 (0.0)	0.5 (0.2)	14.9 (5.9)	31.4 (12.4)	91.2 (35.9)
Average precipitation days (≥ 0.2 mm)	11.0	7.6	8.8	8.3	9.9	9.5	6.8	6.0	7.1	8.9	11.0	12.2	107.1
Average rainy days (≥ 0.2 mm)	3.3	3.5	6.8	8.1	9.9	9.5	6.8	6.0	7.1	8.8	8.0	3.0	80.8
Average snowy days (≥ 0.2 cm)	8.4	4.6	2.3	0.4	0.0	0.0	0.0	0.0	0.0	0.2	3.6	9.7	29.1
