= Regional District of Central Okanagan =

Regional district in British Columbia, Canada

Coordinates: 49.888028°N 119.495417°W

Central Okanagan
- Regional district
- Regional District of Central Okanagan
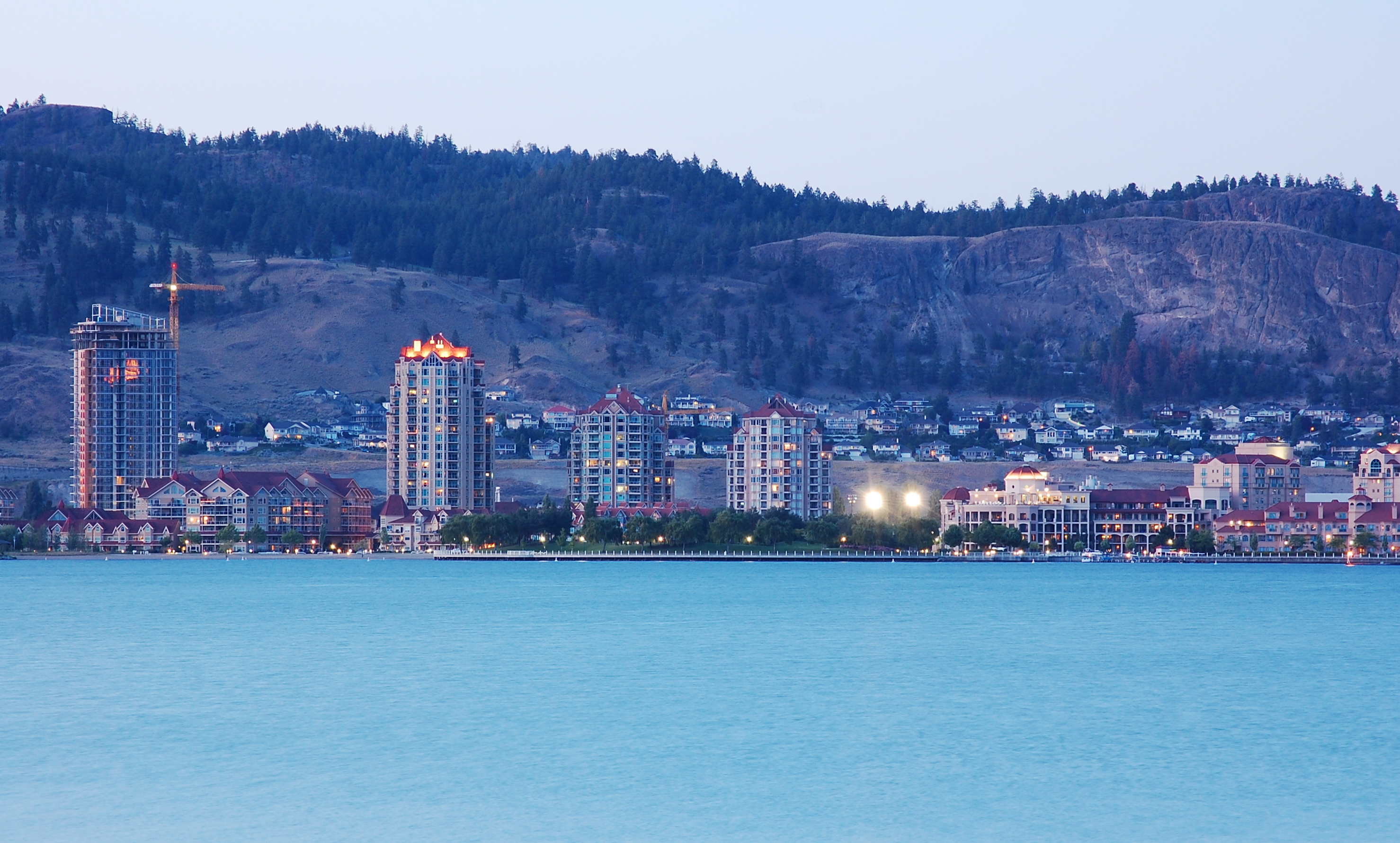
- Downtown Kelowna from West Kelowna

- Logo

- Location in British Columbia
- Country: Canada
- Province: British Columbia
- Established: 1967
- Administrative office location: Kelowna

Government
  - Type: Regional district
  - Body: Board of directors
  - Chair: Loyal Wooldridge (Kelowna)
  - Vice chair: Gord Milsom (West Kelowna)
  - Electoral areas: Central Okanagan East; Central Okanagan West

Area
  - Land: 2,904.86 km^{2} (1,121.57 sq mi)

Population (2016)
  - Total: 194,882
  - Density: 67.1/km^{2} (174/sq mi)
- Time zone: UTC-8 (PST)
- Website: www.rdco.com

The Regional District of Central Okanagan (RDCO) is a regional district in the Canadian province of British Columbia, representing two unincorporated Electoral Areas of Central Okanagan East and Central Okanagan West, along with the member municipalities of the City of Kelowna, City of West Kelowna, the District of Lake Country, the District of Peachland, and Westbank First Nation. The RDCO office is located in Kelowna.

Statistics Canada defines the Kelowna CMA (Census Metropolitan Area) or Kelowna Metropolitan Area as being identical in area with the RDCO. The population in 2016 was 194,882, an increase from the official 2006 Canadian census total of 162,276 (these figures exclude the population of reserves belonging to the Westbank First Nation). The area is 2,904.86 square kilometres.

== Communities ==
=== Incorporated municipalities ===
- Cities
  - Kelowna
  - West Kelowna
- District municipalities
  - Lake Country
  - Peachland

=== Communities and neighbourhoods ===
- Kelowna neighbourhoods
- Belgo
- Benvoulin
- Black Mountain
- Braeloch
- Central City
- Clifton
- Crawford
- Dilworth
- Downtown
- East Kelowna
- Glenmore
- Kettle Valley
- KLO
- McKinley Landing
- Midtown
- Mission
- Pandosy
- Rutland
- Southeast Kelowna
- Southridge
- Quail Ridge
- District municipality villages
- Carr's Landing
- Casa Loma
- Ellison
- Glenrosa
- Lakeview Heights
- Okanagan Centre
- Oyama
- Rose Valley
- Shannon Lake
- Westbank
- Winfield

=== Regional district electoral areas ===
==== Central Okanagan West Electoral (Central Okanagan J) ====
Central Okanagan West Electoral Area used to be known as the Westside Electoral Area. It was created from the merger of Central Okanagan G and Central Okanagan H. The 2005 population exclusive of anyone living on an Indian Reserve, was 37,638 people. In 2007 most of the electoral area's population transferred to the jurisdiction of the newly incorporated District Municipality of West Kelowna.

===== Communities =====
Central Okanagan West

- Beau Park
- Blue Grouse
- Brent Road
- Caesars Landing
- Cinnabar Estates
- Crystal Mountain
- Estamont
- Ewings Landing
- Fintry Delta
- Jenny Creek
- Killiney Beach
- La Casa Resort
- Lake Okanagan Resort
- Muirallen Estates
- Nahun
- Pine Point
- Secret Cove
- Shelter Cove
- Traders Cove
- Trepanier Bench
- Upper Fintry
- Valley of the Sun
- Wainman Cove
- Westshore Estates
- Wilson Landing

=== Indigenous reserves ===
(within the boundaries of, but not part of, the RD)

- Governed by the Okanagan Indian Band:
  - Duck Lake 7 (N end Ellison Lake, just south of Winfield)
- Governed by the Westbank First Nation
  - Tsinstikeptum 9 (in West Kelowna)
  - Tsinstikeptum 10 (usually known as the Westbank Indian Reserve, in West Kelowna)
  - Mission Creek 8 (Okanagan Mission)
  - Medicine Creek 12, 10 km SE of Kelowna
  - Medicine Hill 11, 15 km SE of Kelowna

== Demographics ==
As a census division in the 2021 Census of Population conducted by Statistics Canada, the Regional District of Central Okanagan had a population of 222,162 living in 94,335 of its 102,097 total private dwellings, a change of 14% from its 2016 population of 194,892. With a land area of 2,902.45 km^{2} (1,120.64 sq mi), it had a population density of 76.5/km^{2} (198.2/sq mi) in 2021.

Panethnic groups in the Central Okanagan Regional District (2001–2021)
Panethnic group	2021		2016		2011		2006		2001	
Panethnic group	Pop.	%	Pop.	%	Pop.	%	Pop.	%	Pop.	%
European (Note: Statistic includes all persons that did not make up part of a visible minority or an indigenous identity.)	180,675	82.68%	164,260	86.2%	157,625	89.34%	146,120	91%	136,310	93.39%
Indigenous	13,420	6.14%	11,370	5.97%	8,260	4.68%	6,120	3.81%	3,950	2.71%
South Asian	7,425	3.4%	3,925	2.06%	3,230	1.83%	2,345	1.46%	1,465	1%
East Asian (Note: Statistic includes total responses of "Chinese", "Korean", and "Japanese" under visible minority section on census.)	5,870	2.69%	4,545	2.39%	3,425	1.94%	2,965	1.85%	2,510	1.72%
Southeast Asian (Note: Statistic includes total responses of "Filipino" and "Southeast Asian" under visible minority section on census.)	4,200	1.92%	2,655	1.39%	1,470	0.83%	1,130	0.7%	545	0.37%
African	2,395	1.1%	1,255	0.66%	780	0.44%	660	0.41%	455	0.31%
Latin American	1,790	0.82%	1,065	0.56%	715	0.41%	530	0.33%	415	0.28%
Middle Eastern (Note: Statistic includes total responses of "West Asian" and "Arab" under visible minority section on census.)	1,495	0.68%	695	0.36%	360	0.2%	255	0.16%	140	0.1%
Other (Note: Statistic includes total responses of "Visible minority, n.i.e." and "Multiple visible minorities" under visible minority section on census.)	1,250	0.57%	790	0.41%	560	0.32%	435	0.27%	155	0.11%
Total responses	218,530	98.37%	190,565	97.78%	176,435	98.11%	160,565	98.95%	145,950	98.79%
Total population	222,162	100%	194,882	100%	179,839	100%	162,276	100%	147,739	100%

- Note: Totals greater than 100% due to multiple origin responses.
