= McKinley Landing, British Columbia =

McKinley Landing
- Neighbourhood
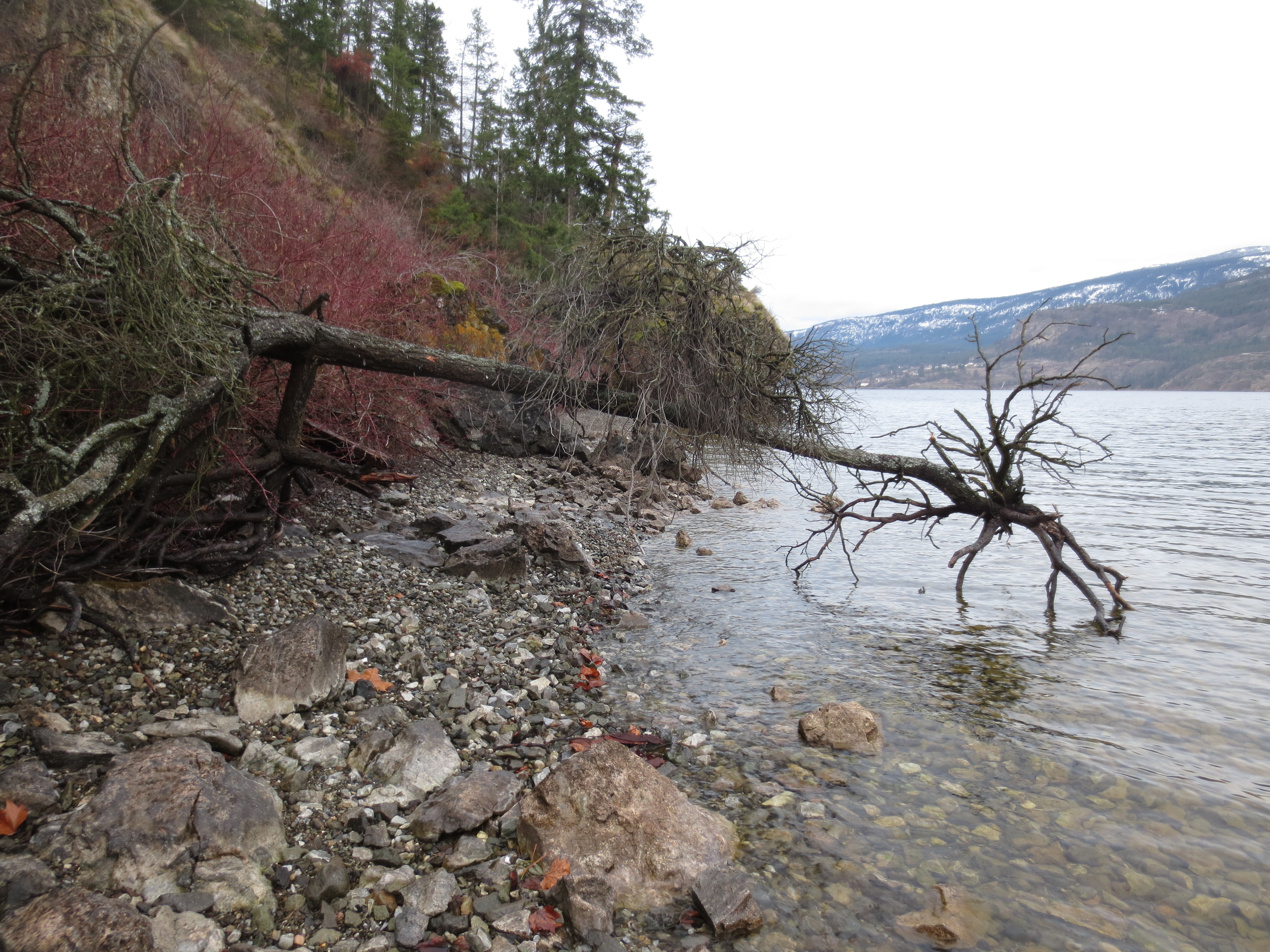
- Late Winter Morning overlooking Okanagan Lake at McKinley Landing
- Interactive map of McKinley Landing
- Coordinates: 49°58′00″N 119°27′00″W
- Country: Canada
- Province: British Columbia
- Regional district: Central Okanagan
- City: Kelowna

McKinley Landing is a small, thinly-populated community on the eastern shore of Lake Okanagan in British Columbia. It was named for John McKinley, an Ontarian who homesteaded in the area for 30 years after arriving via the United States in 1896 in a covered wagon. His landing, all evidence of which is long gone, was used principally by Canadian Pacific Railway boats plying Okanagan Lake. Crews would come ashore to collect wood for the ships’ furnaces, with the vessels then chugging on to more populated places farther north and south.

Images of McKinley Landing
A calm morning by Okanagan Lake at McKinley Landing in Late Winter
