= Kekuli Bay Provincial Park =

Provincial park in British Columbia, Canada

- IUCN category II (national park)
- Location within British Columbia
- Interactive map of Kekuli Bay Provincial Park
- Location: British Columbia, Canada
- Nearest city: Vernon
- Coordinates: 50°11′06″N 119°20′21″W
- Area: 0.57 km^{2} (0.22 sq mi)
- Established: March 8, 1990
- Governing body: BC Parks

Kekuli Bay Provincial Park, formerly Kalamalka West Provincial Park, is a provincial park in British Columbia, Canada, located on the west shore of Kalamalka Lake on BC Highway 97 south of Vernon. The lake is popular for waterskiing and boating, and the park includes a boat launch, as well as a campground with a view of the lake. The park was established in 1990. Its size is about 57 hectares (140 acres).

== See also ==
- Quiggly hole ("kekuli")
- List of Chinook Jargon placenames
