= Ellison, British Columbia =

Ellison
- Unincorporated community
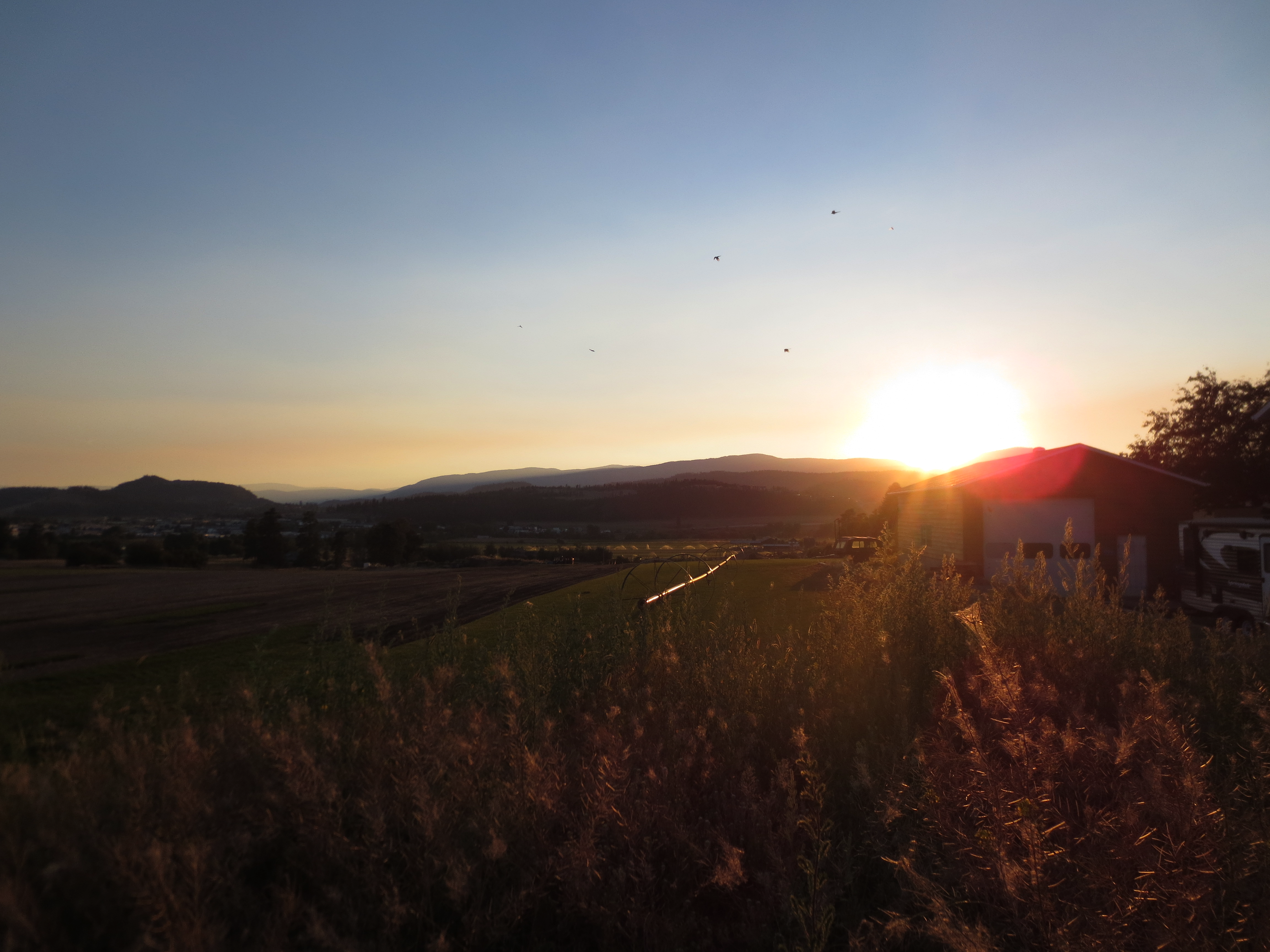
- Summer Sunset over Ellison
- Interactive map of Ellison
- Coordinates: 49°56′25″N 119°21′50″W
- Country: Canada
- Province: British Columbia
- Regional district: Central Okanagan
- Founded: 1955

Area
  - Total: 82.24 km^{2} (31.75 sq mi)

Population (2016)
  - Total: 3,094
  - Density: 37.62/km^{2} (97.44/sq mi)
- Time zone: UTC−07:00 (PT)

Ellison is an unincorporated community located approximately midway up the Okanagan valley within the local government jurisdiction of the Regional District of Central Okanagan. The Ellison community is founded upon a heritage of agriculture, rural acreages and scattered residential neighbourhoods within scenic valley terrain.

The name Ellison was adopted 1 December 1955, and is named after Price Ellison (1852-1932), a stock raiser and wheat grower that settled here in 1876, and at one time owned or controlled 80% of the property in the area. The Ellison Post Office was opened 1 May 1912, with Thomas Clinton as postmaster, and closed 15 May 1920.

The geography of Ellison contains many small and rare dryland ecosystems of open, arid grasslands and pine forest savannahs. Streams that support a diversity of animals and plants cross these dry ecosystems. Water is a precious resource and a focus for biodiversity and wildlife corridors.

There are three main streams that cross the Ellison area; Scotty Creek, Whelan Creek and Mill Creek. These streams and their tributaries are an important habitat in their own right and drain into spawning streams for kokanee, trout and other fish. Ellison also has aspen and cottonwood ecosystems that are wet islands in a dry landscape. These wetlands act as a sponge and a filter that maintain water quality and help maintain the quantity of water in aquifers and streams.
