= Benvoulin =

Neighbourhood in kelowna

- Neighbourhood
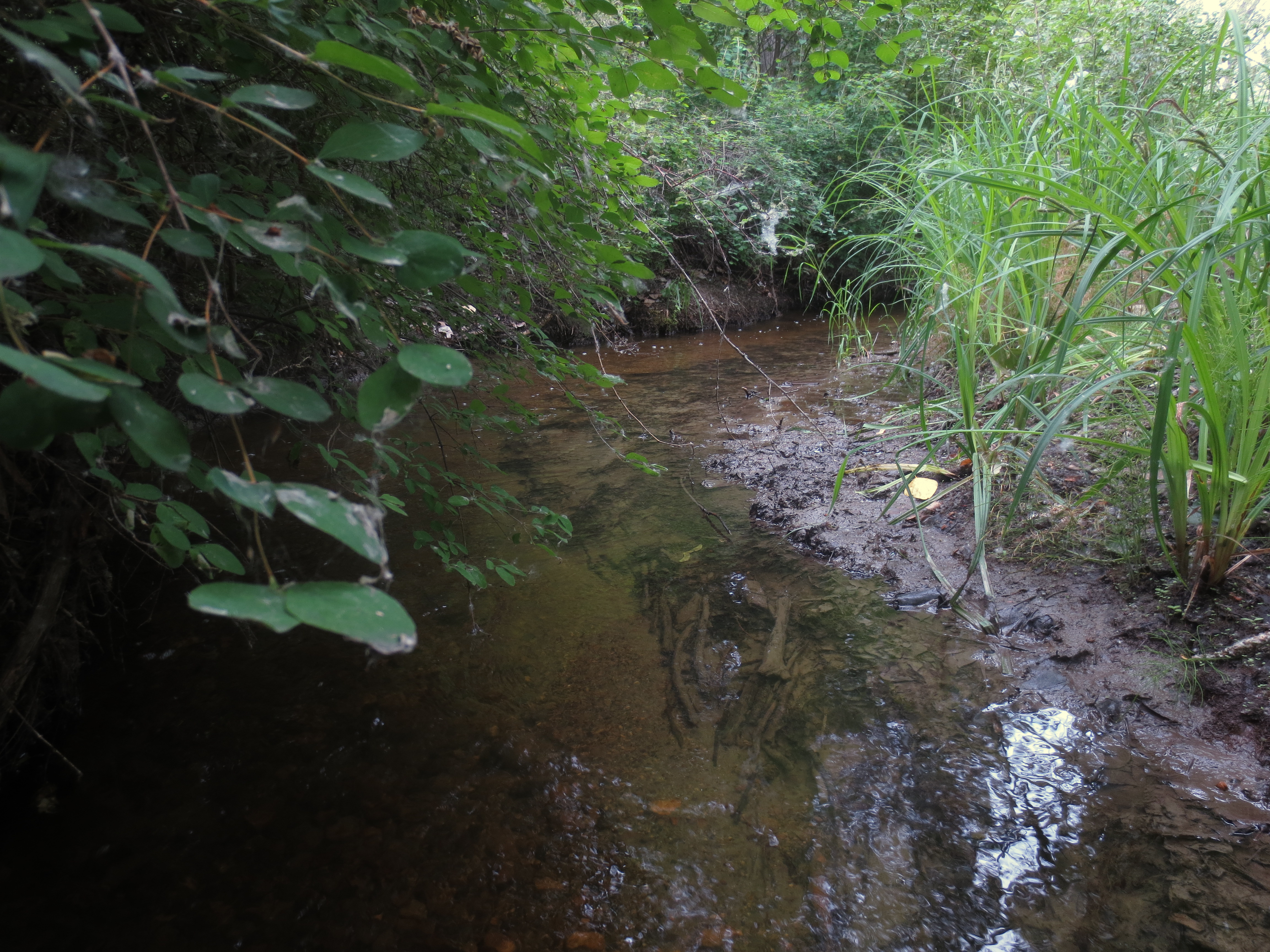
- Creek wandering across Benvoulin Wetlands

- Location within British Columbia
- Coordinates: 49°53′N 119°26′W
- Country: Canada
- Province: British Columbia
- Regional district: Central Okanagan
- City: Kelowna

Benvoulin is a neighbourhood in the City of Kelowna, British Columbia, located on the north side of Mission Creek.

== Name origin ==
Originally named Benvoulin, Benvoulin was the name of the Scottish home of an early real estate investor in Vancouver and the Okanagan, George Grant MacKay, who first arrived in Vancouver in 1888. He bought land in what is now Benvoulin in 1891. MacKay acted as an agent for his friend Lord Aberdeen in buying Coldstream Ranch, and had investments in other Okanagan properties and property-development schemes during the early 1890s. His company built the Kalamalka Hotel at Vernon.

When MacKay first laid out the town in 1891 hoping it would become the southern terminus of the Shuswap and Okanagan Railway, he named the settlement after his home in Scotland.
