= Carr's Landing =

Carr's Landing Carrs
- Neighbourhood
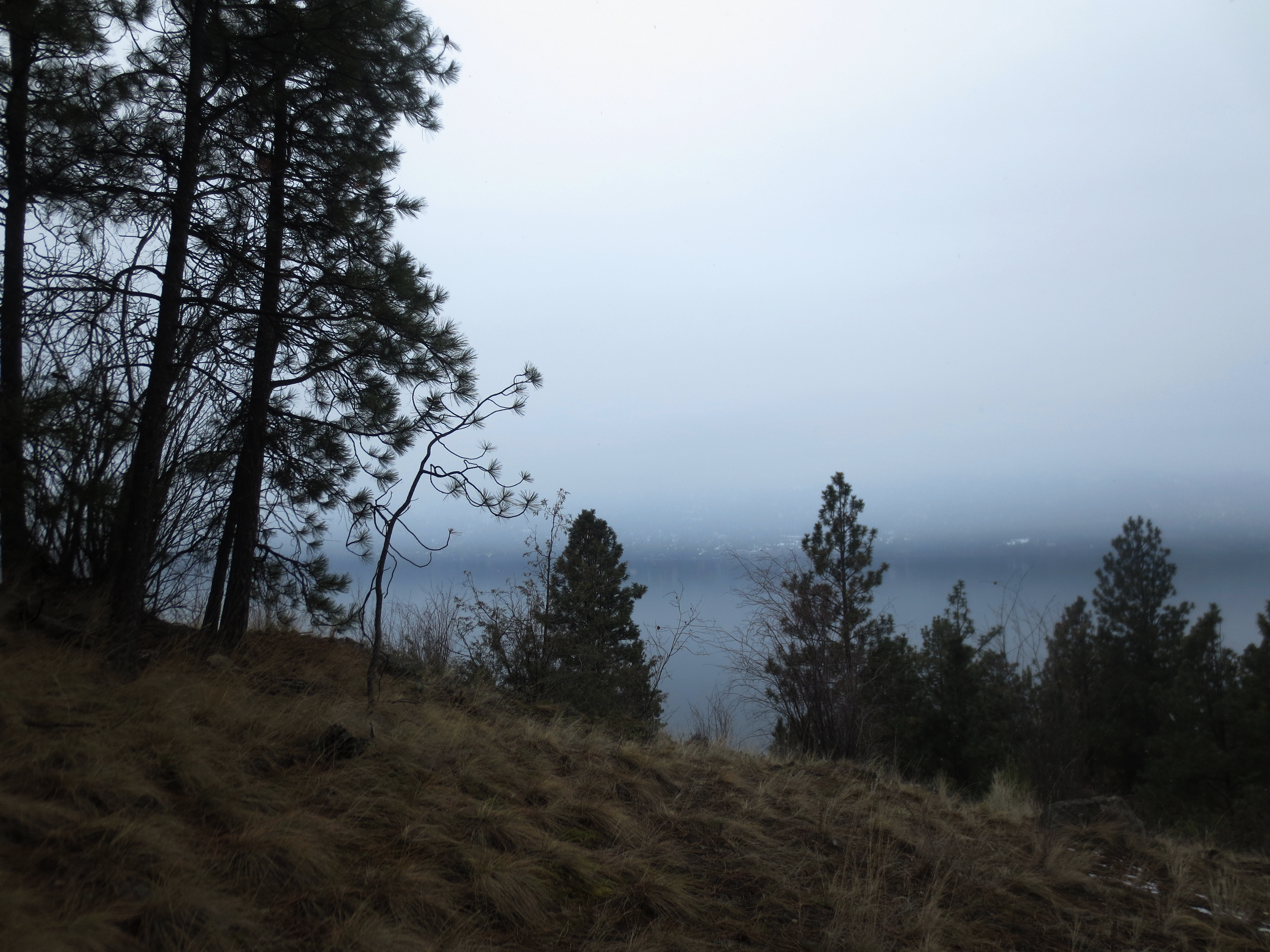
- Overlooking Okanagan Lake by Carr's Landing in Late Winter
- Interactive map of Carr's Landing
- Coordinates: 50°06′54″N 119°27′47″W
- Country: Canada
- Province: British Columbia
- Regional district: Central Okanagan
- District: Lake Country
- Time zone: UTC−08:00 (PST)
  - Summer (DST): UTC−07:00 (PDT)

Carr's Landing, officially Carrs, is a neighbourhood and formal ward in District Municipality of Lake Country, which is located in the Okanagan region of British Columbia, Canada.

It is located by the Okanagan Lake, east of Grant Island, and north of the Okanagan Centre ward.

== History ==
The settlement was named for Andrew Carr, an early settler as of around 1895, who died in 1910. The community and former steamer landing was officially designated only in 1951 as Carr's Landing, based on long-standing use by area residents, even though CPR steamer service had long since ended. In November 1981 the name was officially shortened to Carrs, yet the former name is still being used today.

In 1995, Carr's Landing and its three neighbouring settlements were amalgamated into the new municipality of Lake Country and it became one of the four wards within the municipality.
