= Kalamalka Lake =

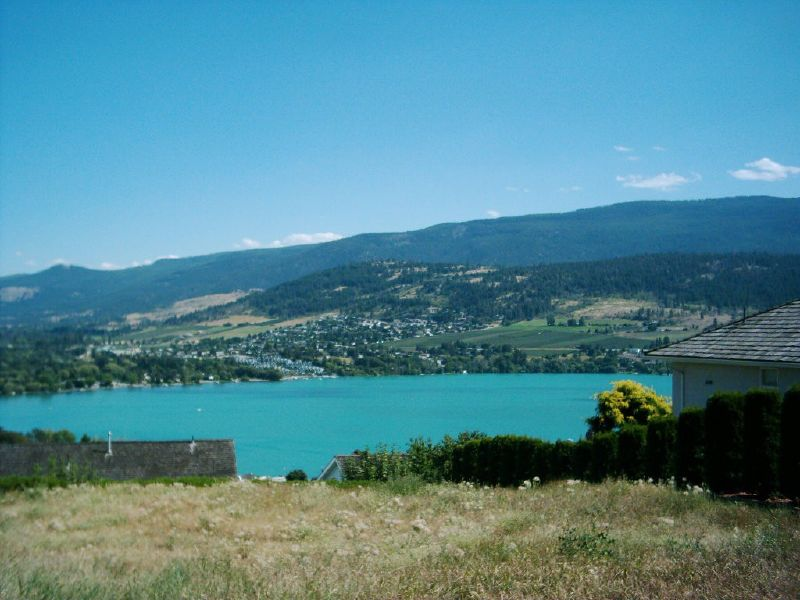

- Location within British Columbia
- Location: Southern Central British Columbia
- Coordinates: 50°10′25″N 119°19′48″W
- Lake type: Glacial Lake
- Primary inflows: Coldstream Creek, Vernon Creek, Oyama Creek
- Primary outflows: Vernon Creek
- Basin countries: Canada
- Max. length: 16 km (52,000 ft)
- Max. width: 3 km (9,800 ft)
- Surface area: 25.7 km^{2} (9.9 sq mi)
- Average depth: 58.5 m (192 ft)
- Max. depth: 142 m (466 ft)
- Water volume: 1.5 km^{3} (0.36 cu mi)
- Residence time: 55.2 years
- Shore length^{1}: 42.4 km (26.3 mi) (approx.)
- Surface elevation: 392 m (1,286 ft)
- Settlements: Coldstream, Lake Country
- ^{1} Shore length is not a well-defined measure.

Kalamalka Lake (a.k.a. "Kal Lake") is a large lake in the interior plateau of southern central British Columbia, Canada, east of Okanagan Lake. The lake is located approximately 4 kilometres (2.5 mi) south of the city of Vernon and is its main drinking water supply. The lake is named after the Okanagan (Okanogan U.S. spelling) First Nation chief who occupied its northern shores.

At different times of the year the colour of the lake can range from cyan to indigo, in different parts at the same time, earning the lake the moniker "lake of a thousand colours". The colour of the water is derived from light scattering, caused by the precipitation of calcium carbonate (CaCO_{3}).

== Hydrology ==
Kalamalka Lake is an oligotrophic, monomictic marl lake with high alkalinity and hardness. From fall to spring the entire water column mixes and is thermally stratified in May through early November. During periods of warmer weather and increasing photosynthesis of phytoplankton, calcium, carbonate ions, and phosphorus in the water column precipitate, changing the colour of the water and increasing the turbidity. As a result, calcium carbonate on vegetation at the shore and Charophytes may be present.

The main inflow is from Wood Lake located to the south and connected by a canal at Oyama. The lake is drained by Vernon Creek which exits at the north end, passes through the city of Vernon, and flows into the Okanagan Lake.

== Tourism ==
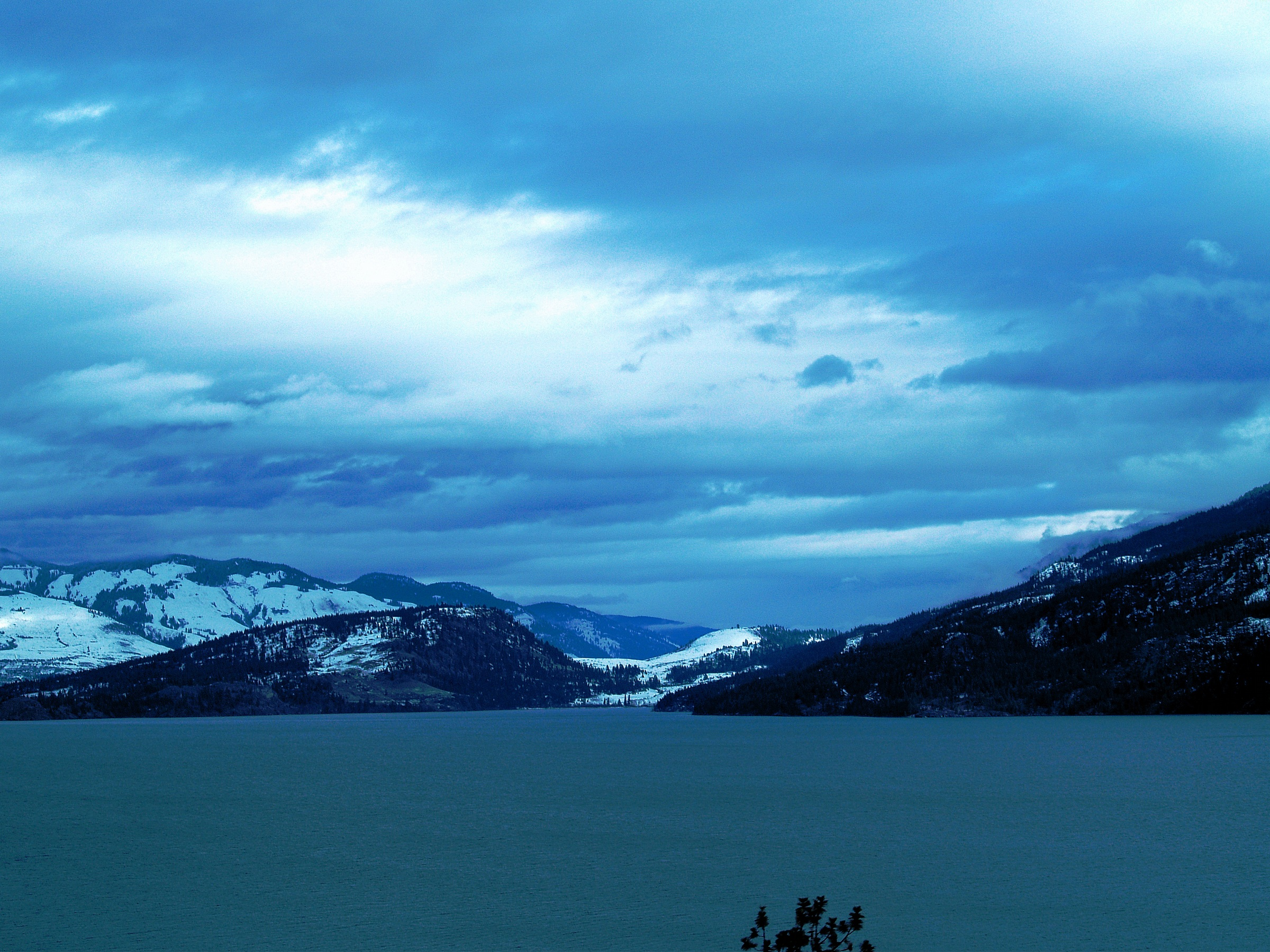
Winter Morning over Kalamalka Lake

Kalamalka Lake has several beaches. Kal Beach and Cosens Bay Beach are in the heart of Kalamalka Lake Provincial Park. Some of the other beaches on this lake are Jade Bay Beach, Juniper Bay Beach, Kekuli Bay Beach, Kirkland Park Beach, and on the south end, Kaloya Regional Park Beach.

Two provincial parks are situated along Kalamalka Lake, Kalamalka Lake Provincial Park and Protected Area (4209 ha) and Kekuli Bay Provincial Park (57 ha).

There are many resorts on the lake including Tween Lakes Resort and Klub Kal. Kalamalka Lake receives very little fishing pressure and is used mostly for recreational boating and water skiing. Tween Lakes Resort is currently the only marina on the lake with a fuel dock.

The main boat launch on Kalamalka lake is located in Kekuli Bay Provincial Park. Smaller, alternative launches include Kinloch Boat Launch, WestKal Road Launch, and Kalavista Boat Launch.

== See also ==
- List of lakes of British Columbia
