= Wood Lake (British Columbia) =

Lake in British Columbia, Canada

- Looking Northward along the West Shoreline of Wood Lake BC in Summer, haze in the sky due to wildfires nearby
- Location within British Columbia
- Location: British Columbia
- Coordinates: 50°05′N 119°23′W
- Catchment area: 190 km^{2} (73 sq mi)
- Basin countries: Canada
- Max. length: 6.6 km (4.1 mi)
- Max. width: 1.68 km (1.04 mi)
- Surface area: 9 km^{2} (3.5 sq mi)
- Average depth: 21.5 m (71 ft)
- Max. depth: 34 m (112 ft)
- Water volume: 0.1995 km^{3} (161,700 acre⋅ft)
- Shore length^{1}: 13.5 km (8.4 mi)
- Surface elevation: 391 m (1,283 ft)
- Settlements: Lake Country
- ^{1} Shore length is not a well-defined measure.

Wood Lake is a lake in a chain of five major lakes which occupies portions of the Okanagan Valley in the interior of British Columbia, Canada. The lakes of the Okanagan Valley were formed by about 8900 BP. Wood Lake is immediately south of Kalamalka Lake and in 1908 was connected to it by a dredged channel (the Oyama canal). Situated between Oyama and Winfield, it has a solid reputation for rainbow trout fishing. The lake is named after Tom Wood, who settled on the south end of the lake around 1860.

The dry climate and suitable soil has encouraged development of a substantial tree fruit industry around the lake and throughout the valley. The upper watershed is heavily forested and has been logged for several decades. The lower elevation of the watershed is described as a Ponderosa pine/bunchgrass area.

== Physical data ==
- Normal range of annual water level fluctuation: 1.2 m
- Number of beaches: 4

There is also a Wood Lake in Fraser Valley, an area of British Columbia.

== Images ==
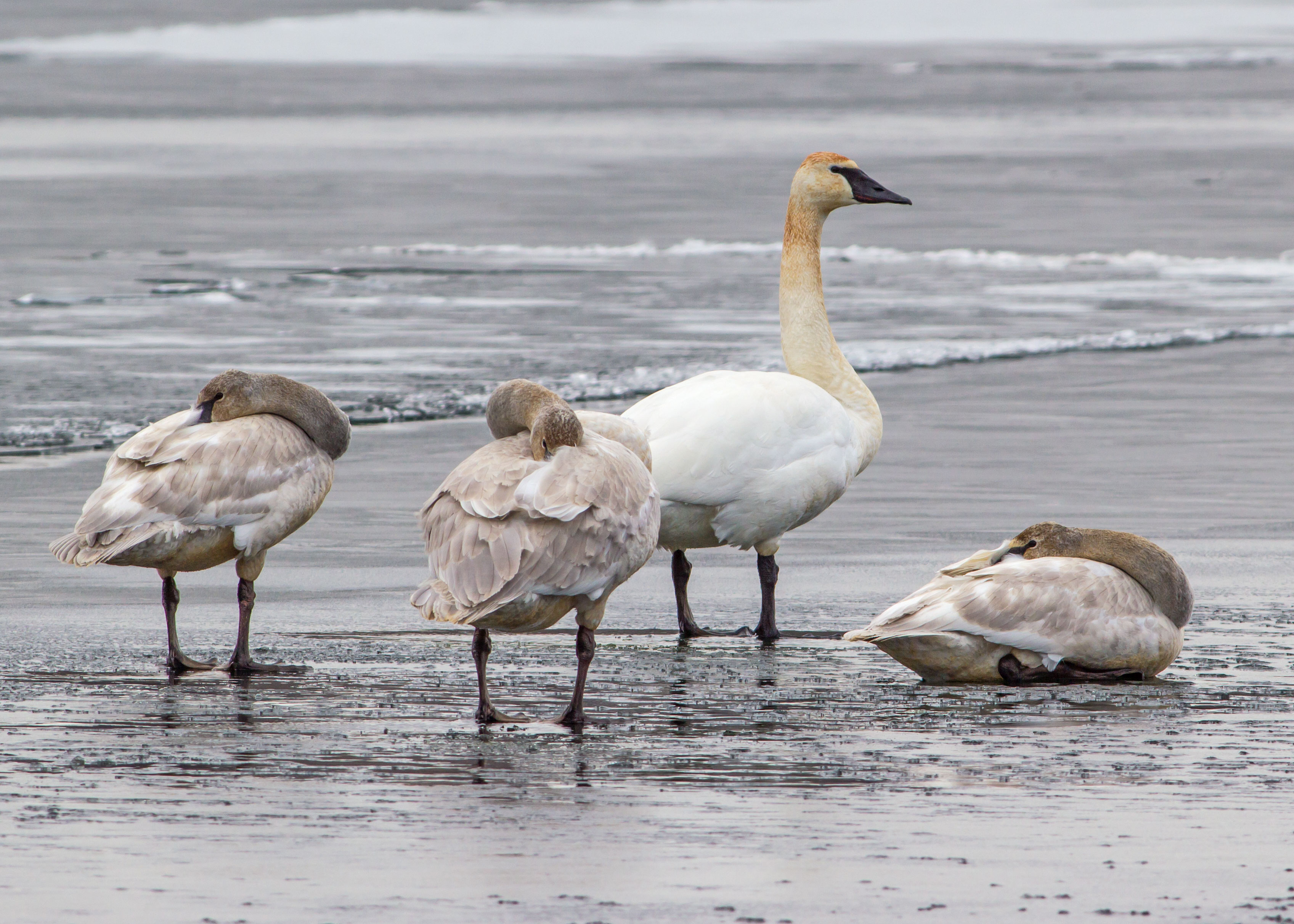
An adult and three juvenile trumpeter swans on the shore of Wood Lake, near Oyama, British Columbia

Loons Swimming in Wood Lake BC on a Summer Morning

Wood Lake from Oyama in 2023

== See also ==
- List of lakes of British Columbia
