= Braeloch =

- Neighbourhood
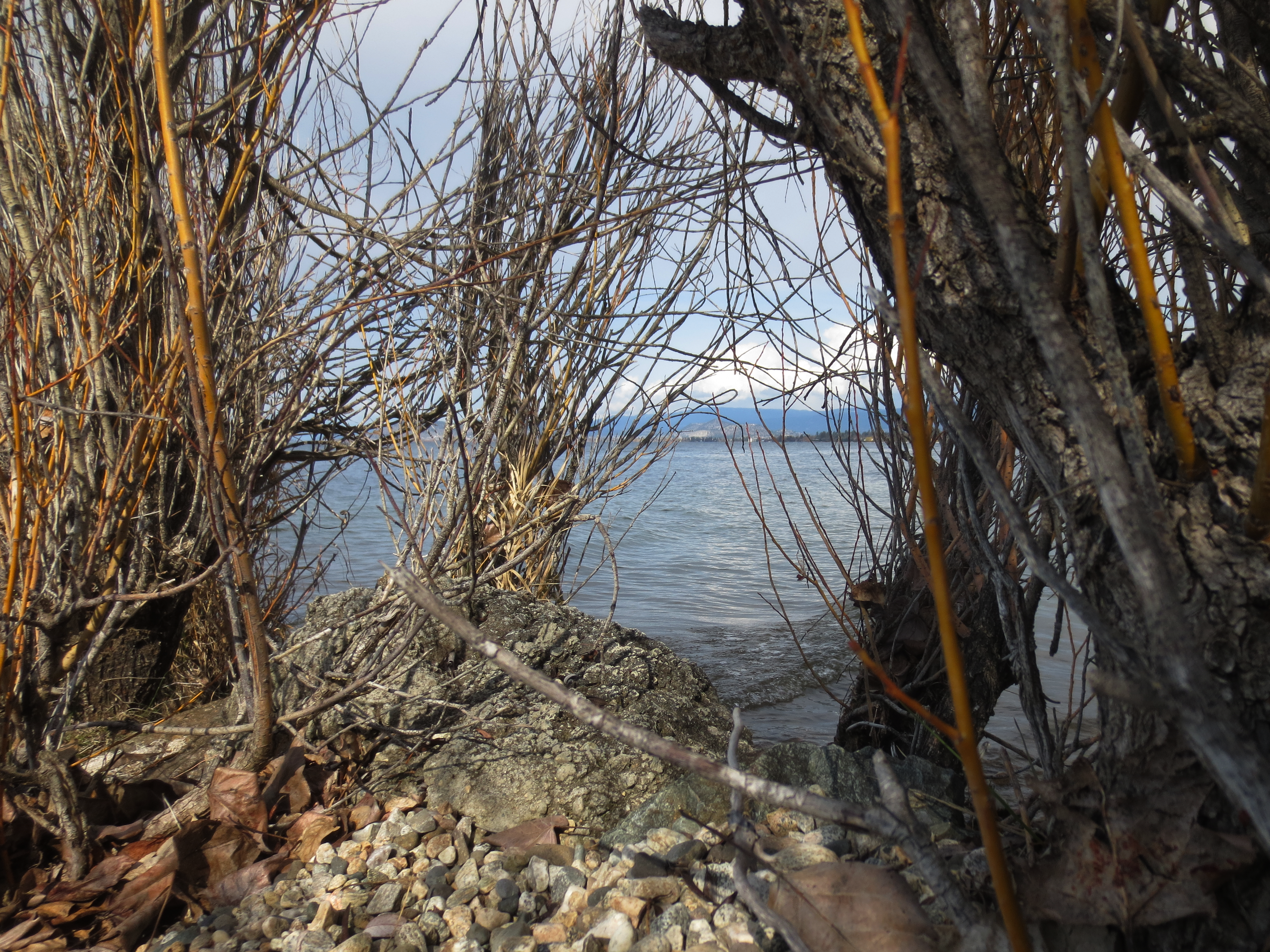
- Peering through undergrowth at the Lake Okanagan shoreline in early spring at the Braeloch Beach access

- Location within British Columbia
- Coordinates: 49.80173°N 119.51761°W
- Country: Canada
- Province: British Columbia
- Regional district: Central Okanagan
- City: Kelowna
- Time zone: UTC−07:00 (PT)

Braeloch is a community south of the city of Kelowna.

== Images ==
Looking across Okanagan Lake from the Braeloch Beach Access

Timelapse of Winter's End at Bertram Creek Park
