= Lake Country =

- District municipality
- District of Lake Country
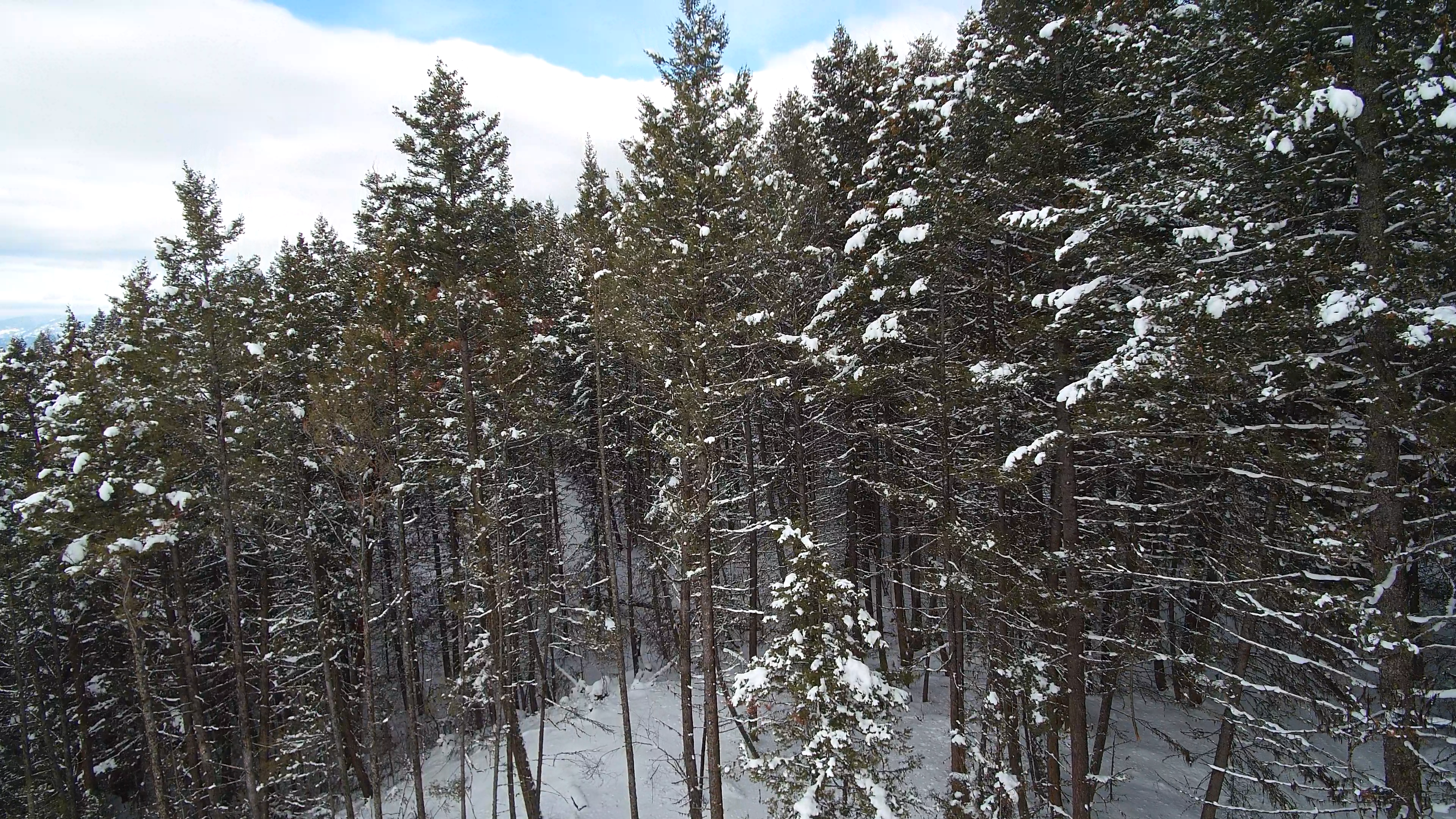
- Aerial view of the Interior Douglas Fir forests of Lake Country

- Location within British Columbia
- Coordinates: 50°05′00″N 119°24′51″W
- Country: Canada
- Province: British Columbia
- Regional district: Central Okanagan
- Incorporated: 1995

Government
  - Governing body: Lake Country Council
  - Mayor: MaryEllen Buhler

Area
  - Total: 122.19 km^{2} (47.18 sq mi)
- Elevation: 600 m (2,000 ft)

Population (2021)
  - Total: 15,817
  - Density: 130/km^{2} (340/sq mi)
- Time zone: UTC−07:00 (PT)
- Highways: 97
- Waterways: Kalamalka Lake; Okanagan Lake; Wood Lake
- Website: www.lakecountry.bc.ca

Lake Country is a district municipality with a population of approximately 15,000 in the Okanagan Valley region of British Columbia, Canada. It is a part of the Central Okanagan Regional District, and of the Kelowna metropolitan area. The city of Kelowna lies to the south, while the city of Vernon lies to the north. As its name suggests, there are a number of lakes in the vicinity of Lake Country, and outside the municipal boundaries in the hills to the east. Okanagan Lake defines the western boundary of the municipality, while the entirety of Wood Lake and the southernmost portion of Kalamalka Lake are encompassed by it.

Lake Country was incorporated in 1995. The previously unincorporated communities of Winfield, Okanagan Centre, Oyama, and Carr's Landing were united to form the new municipality, and they remain as separate wards within it. In the municipal government, one councillor is drawn from each of these wards, while the mayor and two additional councillors are elected by the people at large.

== Wards ==
Lake Country is the only municipality in the province of British Columbia to have the ward system.

The four wards of Lake Country are:

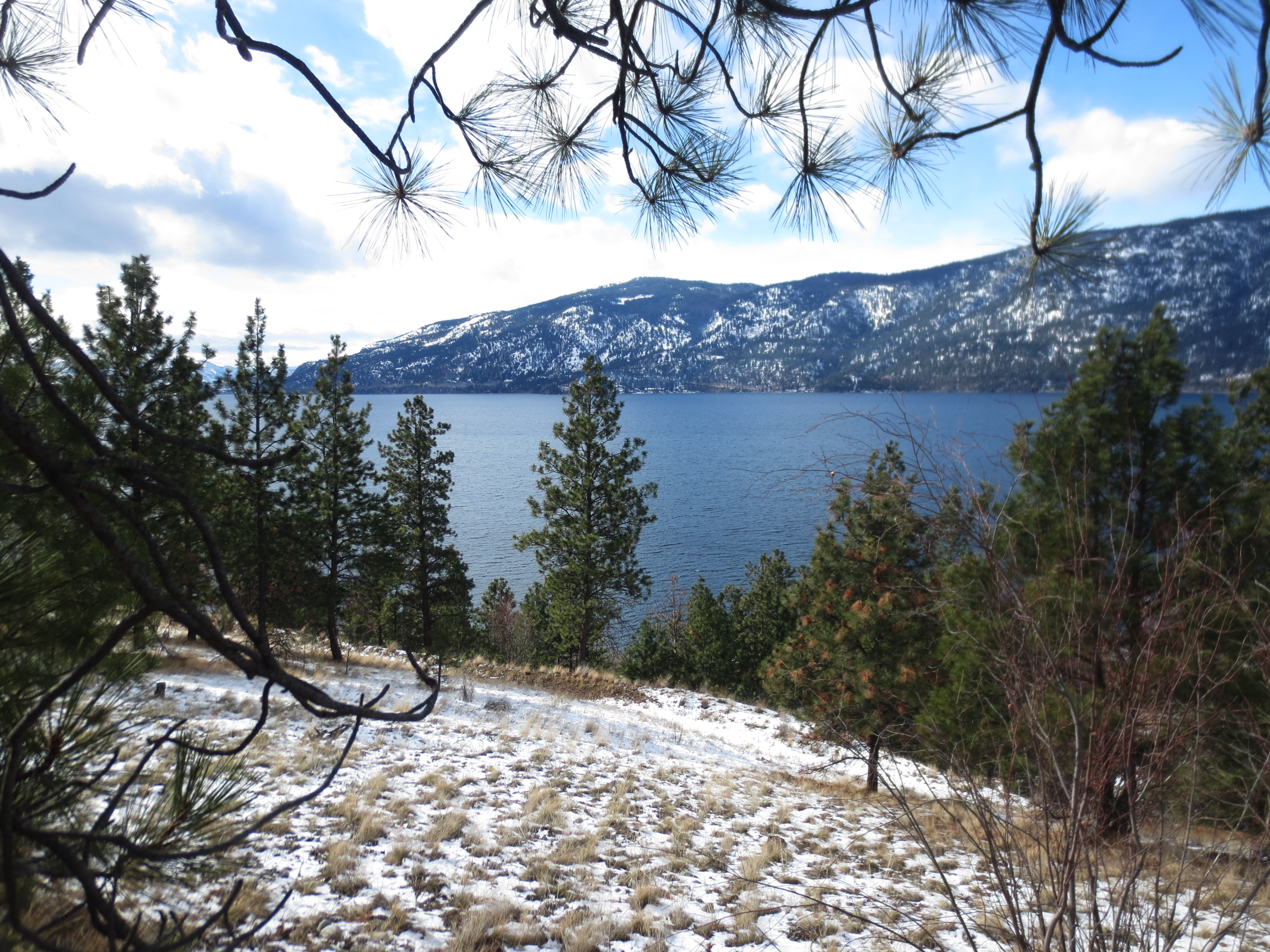
Okanagan Centre

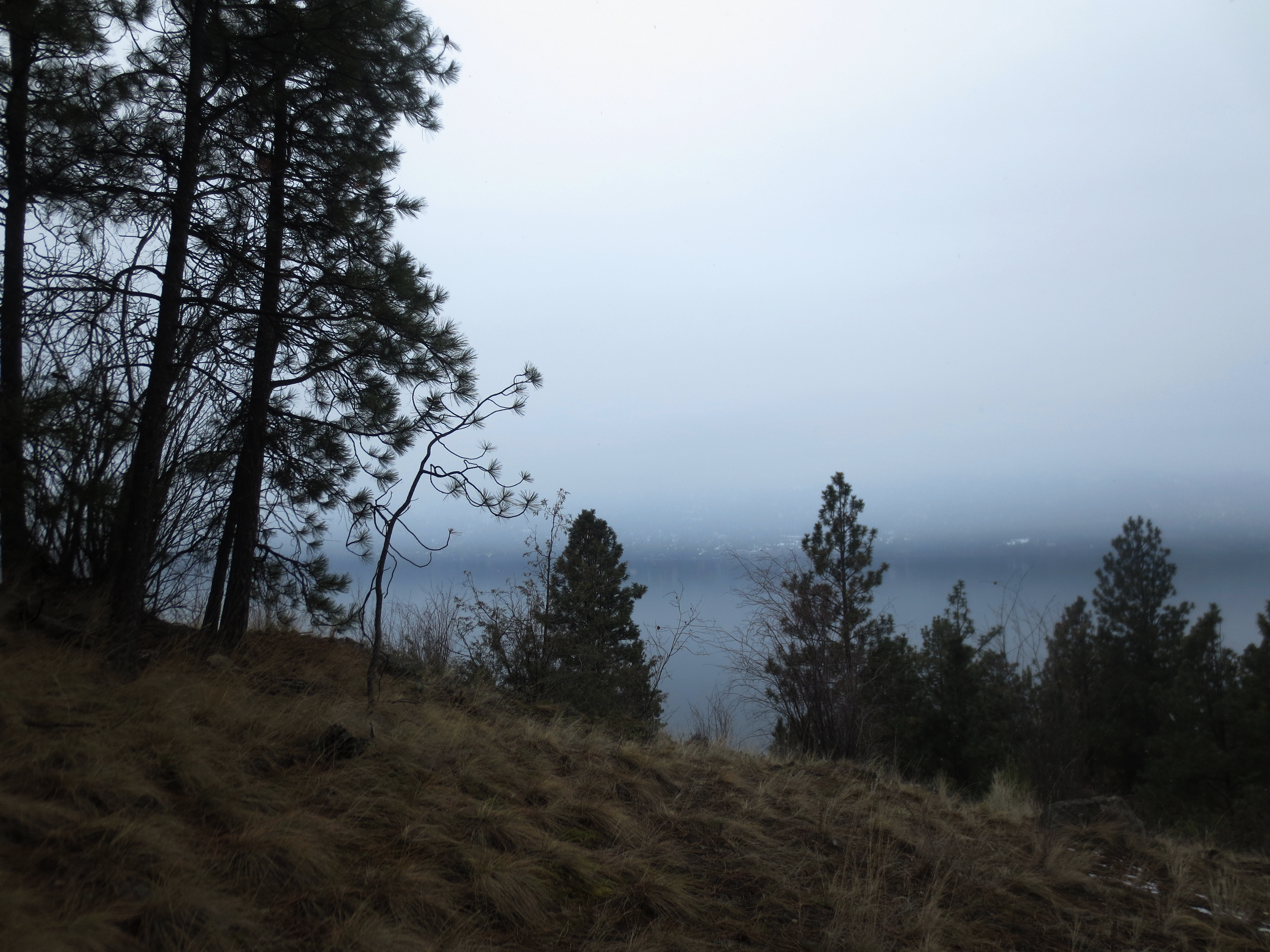
Carr's Landing

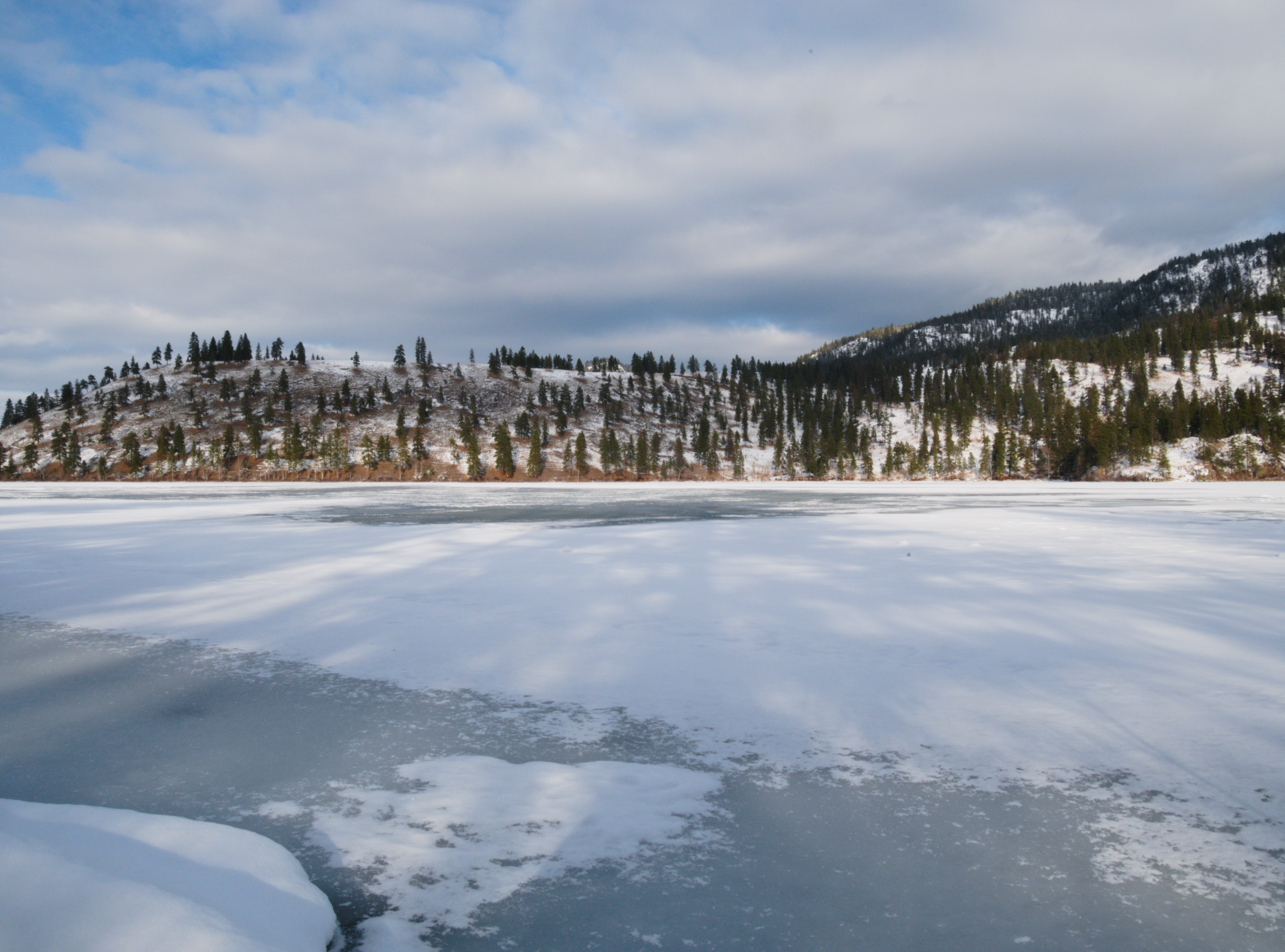
Oyama

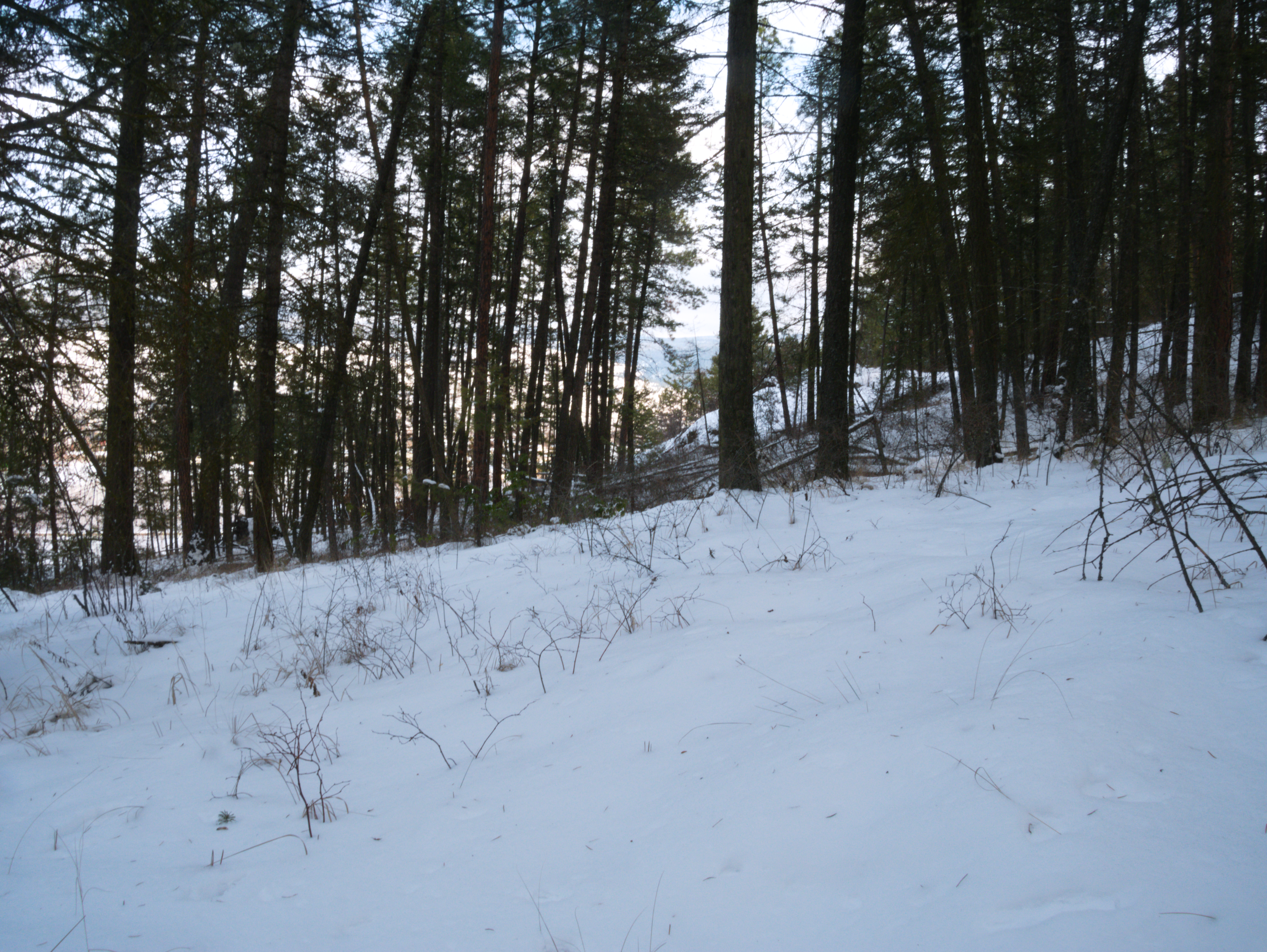
Winfield

== Demographics ==
Historical population
Year	Pop.	±%
1996	9,007	—
2001	9,267	+2.9%
2006	9,606	+3.7%
2011	11,708	+21.9%
2016	12,922	+10.4%
2021	15,817	+22.4%
Sources: Statistics Canada

In the 2021 Canadian census conducted by Statistics Canada, Lake Country had a population of 15,817 living in 6,204 of its 6,852 total private dwellings, a change of 22.4% from its 2016 population of 12,922. With a land area of 122.16 km^{2} (47.17 sq mi), it had a population density of 129.5/km^{2} (335.3/sq mi) in 2021.

Statistics Canada 2006 census:

Age

- Median Age: 43.2
- Aged 15 and Over: 83.4%

Immigration

- Canadian Born: 8360 (87.6%)
- Immigrated pre-1991: 950 (10.0%)
- Immigrated 1991–2006: 225 (2.4%)

Income

- Average Earnings: $24,654 (employed – 6,150 people)
- Average Earnings: $40,040 (employed full-time, year-round – 2,975 people)
- Median Income, Persons Aged 15 and Over: $25,477 (7,650 people)

=== Ethnicity ===
Panethnic groups in the District of Lake Country (1996−2021)
Panethnic group	2021		2016		2011		2006		2001		1996	
Panethnic group	Pop.	%	Pop.	%	Pop.	%	Pop.	%	Pop.	%	Pop.	%
European (Note: Statistic includes all persons that did not make up part of a visible minority or an indigenous identity.)	13,665	87.43%	11,390	89.51%	10,620	93.49%	8,900	93.24%	8,835	95.41%	8,630	96.26%
Indigenous	970	6.21%	740	5.82%	405	3.57%	290	3.04%	265	2.86%	125	1.39%
South Asian	315	2.02%	165	1.3%	180	1.58%	115	1.2%	85	0.92%	70	0.78%
East Asian (Note: Statistic includes total responses of "Chinese", "Korean", and "Japanese" under visible minority section on census.)	275	1.76%	145	1.14%	55	0.48%	110	1.15%	25	0.27%	105	1.17%
Southeast Asian (Note: Statistic includes total responses of "Filipino" and "Southeast Asian" under visible minority section on census.)	135	0.86%	120	0.94%	20	0.18%	10	0.1%	20	0.22%	10	0.11%
Latin American	100	0.64%	65	0.51%	25	0.22%	15	0.16%	0	0%	0	0%
Middle Eastern (Note: Statistic includes total responses of "West Asian" and "Arab" under visible minority section on census.)	65	0.42%	10	0.08%	0	0%	60	0.63%	10	0.11%	0	0%
African	60	0.38%	30	0.24%	0	0%	15	0.16%	20	0.22%	0	0%
Other/multiracial (Note: Statistic includes total responses of "Visible minority, n.i.e." and "Multiple visible minorities" under visible minority section on census.)	40	0.26%	65	0.51%	40	0.35%	35	0.37%	0	0%	20	0.22%
Total responses	15,630	98.82%	12,725	98.48%	11,360	97.03%	9,545	99.36%	9,260	99.92%	8,965	99.53%
Total population	15,817	100%	12,922	100%	11,708	100%	9,606	100%	9,267	100%	9,007	100%
Note: Totals greater than 100% due to multiple origin responses.

=== Religion ===
According to the 2021 census, religious groups in Lake Country included:

- Irreligion (9,080 persons or 58.1%)
- Christianity (6,060 persons or 38.8%)
- Sikhism (170 persons or 1.1%)
- Hinduism (55 persons or 0.4%)
- Buddhism (35 persons or 0.2%)
- Islam (35 persons or 0.2%)
- Judaism (25 persons or 0.2%)
- Other (155 persons or 1.0%)

According to the 2001 Canadian census, religious groups in Lake Country included:

- No religion: 3,585 (38.7%)
- Protestant: 3,310 (35.7%)
- Roman Catholic 1535 (16.6%)
- Other Christian: 580 (6.3%)
- Other religions: 240 (2.6%)

== Government ==
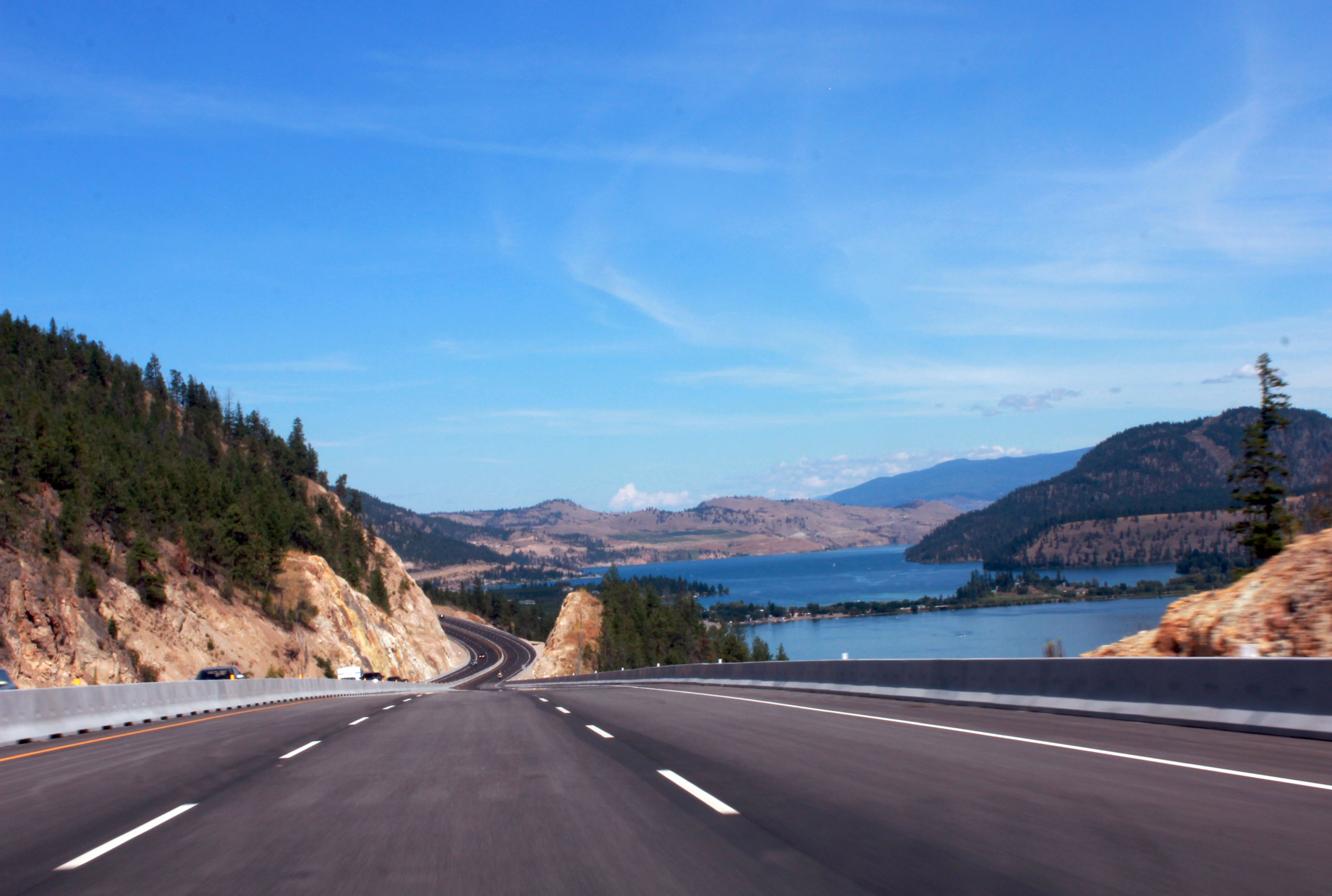
Highway 97 at Lake Country

=== Municipal ===
Municipal elections were held on October 15, 2022. Blair Ireland ran unopposed and was declared mayor.

Two councillors at-large were elected: Michael Lewis and Bib Patel. Representing the wards of the municipality are: Heather Irvine, Winfield; Tricia Brett, Okanagan Centre; Cara Reed, Carr's Landing; Todd McKenzie, Oyama.

=== Provincial ===
Lake Country federal election results
Year	Liberal		Conservative		New Democratic		Green	
2021	22%	1,848	51%	4,182	15%	1,235	4%	312
2019	30%	2,412	48%	3,892	10%	844	9%	705

Lake Country provincial election results
Year	New Democratic		BC Liberal		Green	
2020	24%	1,271	56%	2,933	16%	849
2017	19%	970	59%	3,062	22%	1,114

Provincially, Lake Country is part of the constituency of Kelowna—Lake Country, this seat having been occupied by Norm Letnick of the BC Liberal Party since May 2009.

=== Federal ===
Federally, Lake Country is part of the riding of Kelowna—Lake Country. Despite the similarity in nomenclature, the federal riding encompasses a greater area and population than its provincial counterpart. Tracy Gray of the Conservative Party was first elected as MP in October 2019.

== Education ==
Public education in Lake Country is provided by School District 23 Central Okanagan. Three elementary schools are located in the Municipality: Davidson Road Elementary, Oyama Traditional School, and Peter Greer Elementary. All three cover Kindergarten to Grade 5. H.S Grenda Middle School covers Grades 6 to 8. Lake Country is also home to George Elliot Secondary, which covers Grades 9 to 12.

The two largest institutions providing post-secondary education in the area of Lake Country are UBC Okanagan, the campus which lies in north Kelowna, and Okanagan College, which has campuses in Kelowna and Coldstream.

== Transportation ==
Lake Country is situated on the major north-south route through the Okanagan valley, Highway 97, approximately 15 km of which lies within the municipality, passing through Winfield and Oyama. To the south, the highway provides a route to Kelowna, whose downtown core is 20 km south of the municipal boundary. Glenmore Road provides an alternate route to Kelowna. To the north, the highway leads to Vernon, whose downtown is 15 km north of the municipal boundary. Vernon can also be accessed via Commonage Road. Until 2013, the highway was only four-laned through Winfield and north of Oyama, while the section from Winfield to Oyama was two-laned. This two-laned section of Highway 97 became notorious for several major accidents and congestion and the highway was upgraded to a four-lane limited-access road, officially opened on August 16, 2013. The new highway was relocated further to the west of Wood Lake and the old highway was renamed to Pelmewash Parkway to accommodate a future recreational corridor.

A regular public bus service by Kelowna Regional Transit System, route 23, is available from Winfield to Kelowna at the UBC Okanagan exchange. A less frequent peak hour express service by Vernon Regional Transit System, route 90, is also available, connecting Oyama and Winfield with Vernon and UBC Okanagan exchange. A new bus service, route 32, establishes connections throughout the various communities in Lake Country.

Lake Country is in close proximity to Kelowna International Airport, which lies only 8 km to the south, and provides regular service to major cities such as Vancouver, Victoria, Seattle, Los Angeles, Calgary, Edmonton, and Toronto.

== Accolades ==
In 2016, Lake Country was one of five communities in British Columbia honoured with the Small Business Roundtable's Open for Business Award in recognition of local efforts to foster economic growth.
