= Knox Mountain Park =

Natural park in Kelowna, British Columbia

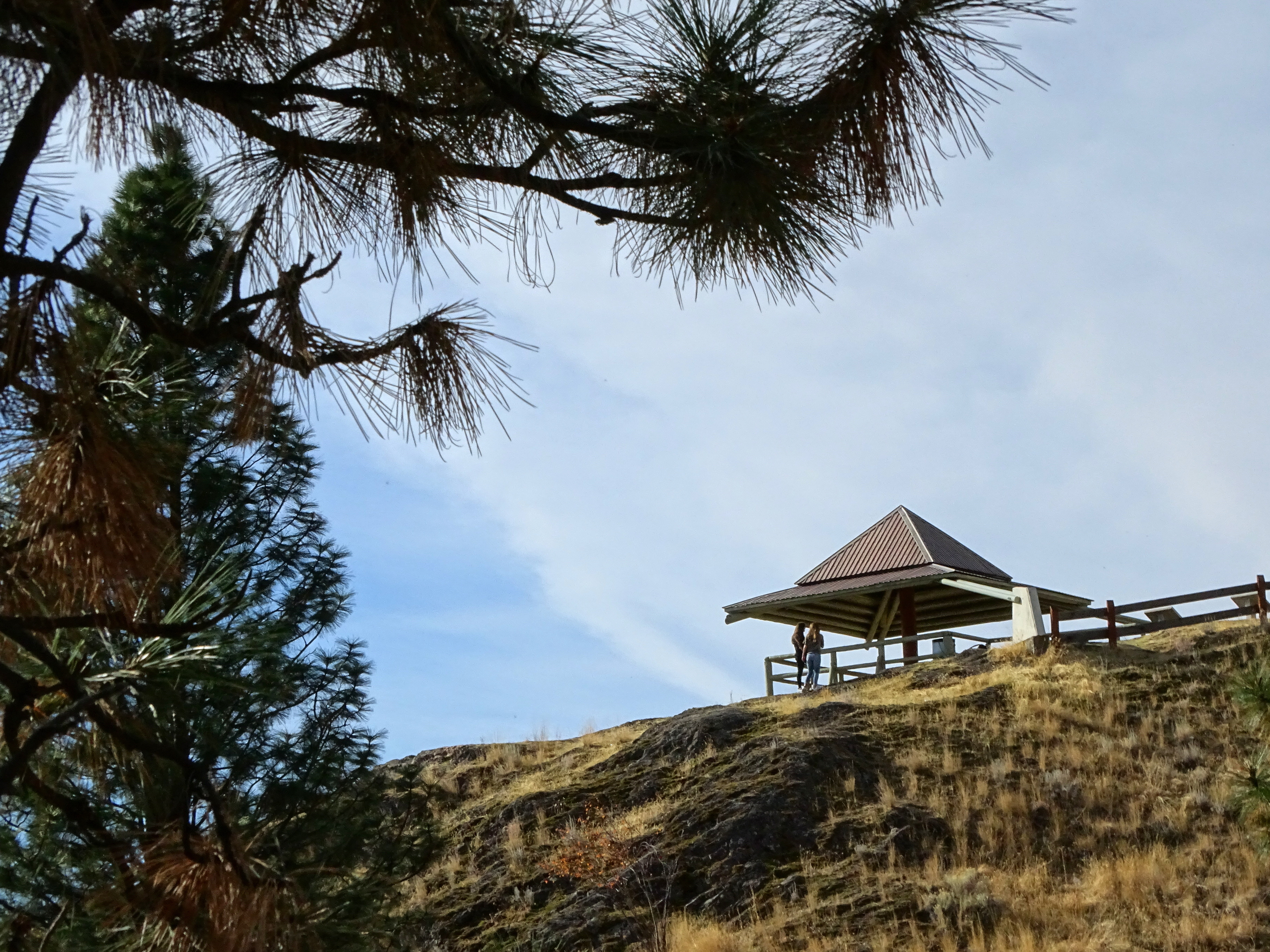
- Interactive map of Knox Mountain Park
- Location: Kelowna, British Columbia, Canada
- Coordinates: 49.911°N 119.482°W
- Area: 235 ha (580 acres)

Knox Mountain Park is a natural park and recreation area located in Kelowna, British Columbia, north of the city's core. It is one of the most popular attractions for tourists visiting Okanagan Valley. Apex Trail is a 4.0 kilometre, lightly trafficked out-and-back trail, best used from May till September The park is made up of 235 hectares (580 acres) of forest and grassland and contains a variety of wildlife, such as deer, birds, an occasional grizzly bear and Kokanee salmon that spawn along the lakeshore adjacent to the park.

There are 10 trails in the park of varying length and difficulty, providing views of both Kelowna and Okanagan lake There are two lookout points, including the mountain's summit, which can be reached by car, making the mountain a picnicking location, as well as popular hiking and running destination. The mountains trails are also commonly utilized by mountain bikers. The park is open 9:30am to 9:00pm during most of the year. According to the City of Kelowna web site, Knox Mountain Park is considered among the most important and well-known natural area parks in Kelowna.

Lake Okanagan from Knox Mountain Park

== History ==
Knox Mountain Park was named after the notorious Arthur Booth Knox, a resident of Kelowna from the late 19th century. Knox, a rancher, was convicted of setting fire to several haystacks belonging to his competition and sentenced to three years of hard labour. In his book Buckaroos And Mud Pups: The Early Days of Ranching in British Columbia, Ken Mather explains that a cowboy working for Knox provided the testimony that resulted in his conviction, despite evidence that he was bribed to give a false testimony. Following his 3-year sentence, Knox returned to Kelowna and continued to grow his ranching property. The portion of his property that encompassed Knox Mountain was sold to the Okanagan Fruit and Land Co. in 1906.

In 1999, a group of Kelowna residents formed a society called the Friends of Knox Mountain Park to advocate for and to promote stewardship of the park.

Each year the park becomes the site of the Knox Mountain Hillclimb car race, which has been run on a steep course in the park for over 60 years, making it the longest annually running paved hill climb in North America.

== Flora and fauna ==
Knox Mountain Park contains several representative Okanagan ecosystems as it transitions from lakeshore to mountain top. These include riparian, wetland, Ponderosa Pine Bunch Grass, and dry Interior Douglas-fir. These ecosystems are fragile, dry and highly susceptible to erosion and degradation; therefore park visitors are encouraged to stay on designated trails.

Knox Mountain Park is home to Kelowna's official flower, the Arrowleaf Balsamroot or Okanagan Sunflower (Balsamorhiza sagittata). The bright yellow flowers carpet the south facing park slopes in late April or early May. First Nations used nearly all parts of this plant for food by steaming the roots and eating the young shoots and seeds.

Commonly encountered wildlife species include mammals such as mule deer, coyotes, marmots, chipmunks and occasionally moose and bear.

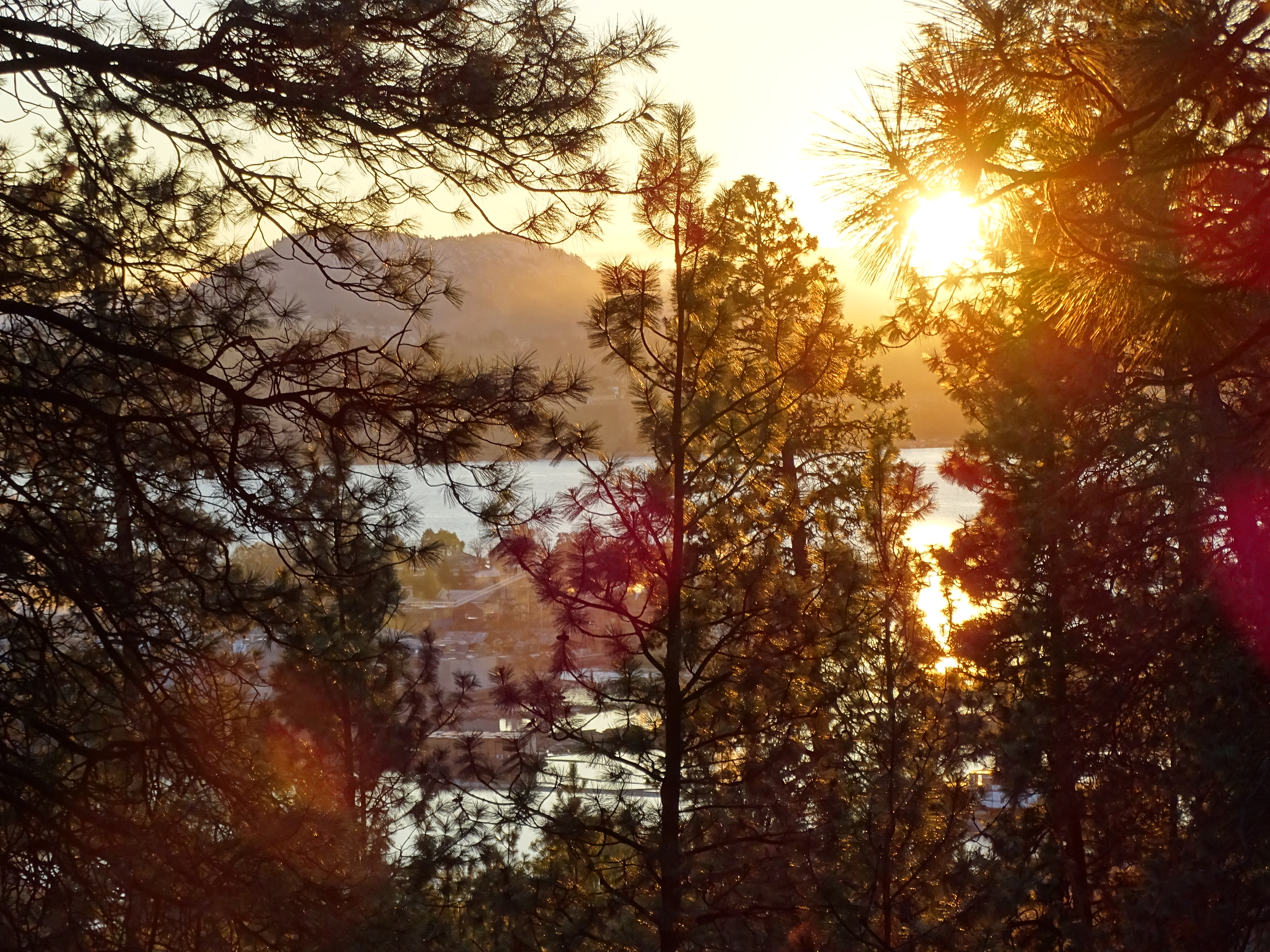
Kelowna. Knox Mountain Park. Sunset

== See also ==
Hillclimbing#Canada
