= Oyama, British Columbia =

Oyama
- neighbourhood
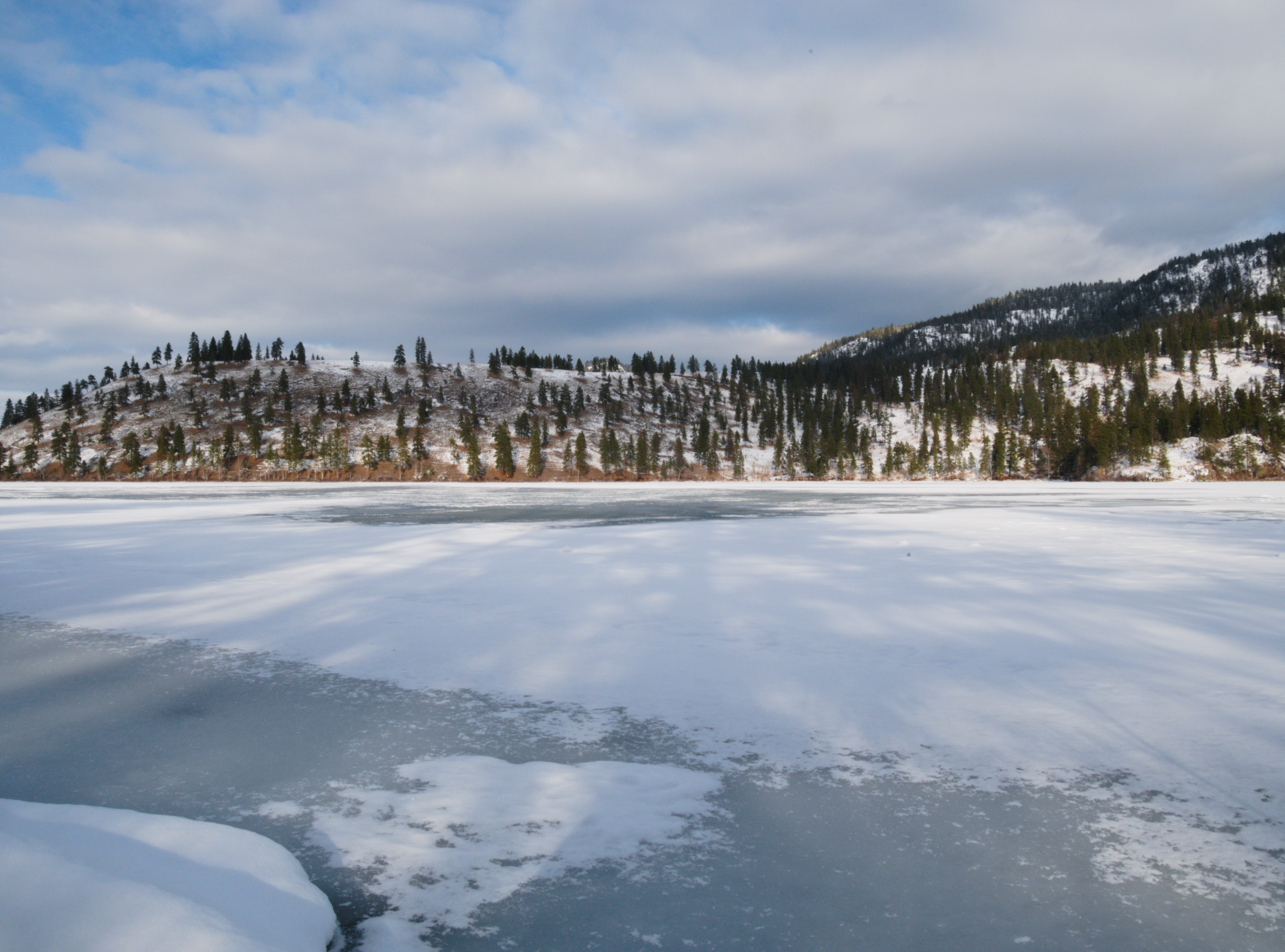
- Looking across frozen Kalamalka Lake from Kaloya Regional Park
- Interactive map of Oyama
- Coordinates: 50°07′00″N 119°22′00″W
- Country: Canada
- Province: British Columbia
- Regional district: Central Okanagan
- District: Lake Country

Population
  - Total: 985

Oyama is a neighbourhood and formal ward located within the district municipality of Lake Country, which is located in the Okanagan region in British Columbia, Canada. It is located at the north end of Wood Lake and at the south end of Kalamalka Lake opposite BC Highway 97.

== Name origin ==
Oyama was named after Japanese Field Marshal Ōyama Iwao in 1906 by the first postmaster Dr. W. H. Irvine.

== Climate ==
Climate data for Oyama
Month	Jan	Feb	Mar	Apr	May	Jun	Jul	Aug	Sep	Oct	Nov	Dec	Year
Record high °C (°F)	16 (61)	15 (59)	21 (70)	27.8 (82.0)	33 (91)	36.5 (97.7)	39 (102)	37 (99)	32.5 (90.5)	27.5 (81.5)	20 (68)	13.5 (56.3)	39 (102)
Mean daily maximum °C (°F)	0.6 (33.1)	2.8 (37.0)	9.6 (49.3)	14.7 (58.5)	19.8 (67.6)	23.3 (73.9)	26.3 (79.3)	26.6 (79.9)	20.4 (68.7)	12.6 (54.7)	4.8 (40.6)	0 (32)	13.5 (56.2)
Daily mean °C (°F)	−1.9 (28.6)	−0.6 (30.9)	4.5 (40.1)	8.9 (48.0)	13.4 (56.1)	17.1 (62.8)	19.4 (66.9)	19.7 (67.5)	14.4 (57.9)	8.2 (46.8)	2 (36)	−2.3 (27.9)	8.6 (47.5)
Mean daily minimum °C (°F)	−4.4 (24.1)	−3.9 (25.0)	−0.6 (30.9)	3.1 (37.6)	6.9 (44.4)	10.9 (51.6)	12.5 (54.5)	12.8 (55.0)	8.3 (46.9)	3.8 (38.8)	−0.9 (30.4)	−4.6 (23.7)	3.7 (38.7)
Record low °C (°F)	−25.5 (−13.9)	−23 (−9)	−19.4 (−2.9)	−5 (23)	−2 (28)	0.6 (33.1)	3.9 (39.0)	3.5 (38.3)	−2.5 (27.5)	−16 (3)	−27.5 (−17.5)	−26.5 (−15.7)	−27.5 (−17.5)
Average precipitation mm (inches)	41.1 (1.62)	32 (1.3)	32.3 (1.27)	37.6 (1.48)	48 (1.9)	54.1 (2.13)	50.7 (2.00)	34.5 (1.36)	43.2 (1.70)	36.4 (1.43)	53.6 (2.11)	51.9 (2.04)	515.2 (20.28)
Average rainfall mm (inches)	12.6 (0.50)	18 (0.7)	27.7 (1.09)	37.6 (1.48)	48 (1.9)	54.1 (2.13)	50.7 (2.00)	34.5 (1.36)	43.2 (1.70)	35.9 (1.41)	36.1 (1.42)	12.6 (0.50)	411 (16.2)
Average snowfall cm (inches)	28.5 (11.2)	14 (5.5)	4.5 (1.8)	0 (0)	0 (0)	0 (0)	0 (0)	0 (0)	0 (0)	0.5 (0.2)	17.5 (6.9)	39.3 (15.5)	104.2 (41.0)

== Education ==
It is home to Oyama Traditional School, a public elementary school that is part of the School District 23 Central Okanagan, which is based in Kelowna.
