= Okanagan Centre, British Columbia =

Okanagan Centre
- Neighbourhood
- Snow Dusted Lake Shore of Okanagan Centre on a Late Winter Morning
- Interactive map of Okanagan Centre
- Coordinates: 50°03′00″N 119°27′00″W
- Country: Canada
- Province: British Columbia
- Regional district: Central Okanagan
- District: Lake Country

Population
  - Total: 547

Okanagan Centre is a neighbourhood and formal ward within Lake Country, British Columbia, Canada. It is on the east shore of Okanagan Lake to the north of Kelowna and just northwest of Winfield, another wards of the District of Lake Country.

== History ==
Okanagan Centre was originally designated as a "post office, steamer landing and settlement" in 1930, then revised in 1951 to "post office and steamer landing", and it was designated a "community" in 1983. Okanagan Centre was incorporated to the district municipality of Lake Country in 1995.

== Climate ==
Okanagan Centre has an inland oceanic climate (Cfb) or a marginal continental climate (Dfb) depending on the isotherm. The waters of Okanagan Lake help to moderate winter temperatures, meaning that the area has more in common with more southerly Penticton in terms of climate.

Climate data for Okanagan Centre
| Month | Jan | Feb | Mar | Apr | May | Jun | Jul | Aug | Sep | Oct | Nov | Dec | Year |
|---|---|---|---|---|---|---|---|---|---|---|---|---|---|
| Record high °C (°F) | 13.0 (55.4) | 17.2 (63.0) | 21.5 (70.7) | 28.9 (84.0) | 33.0 (91.4) | 36.8 (98.2) | 40.0 (104.0) | 40.0 (104.0) | 35.0 (95.0) | 30.6 (87.1) | 20.6 (69.1) | 15.6 (60.1) | 40.0 (104.0) |
| Mean daily maximum °C (°F) | 1.8 (35.2) | 4.1 (39.4) | 9.3 (48.7) | 15.0 (59.0) | 19.8 (67.6) | 23.8 (74.8) | 27.3 (81.1) | 26.8 (80.2) | 20.9 (69.6) | 13.1 (55.6) | 6.0 (42.8) | 2.1 (35.8) | 14.2 (57.5) |
| Daily mean °C (°F) | −0.5 (31.1) | 1.0 (33.8) | 4.8 (40.6) | 9.4 (48.9) | 13.9 (57.0) | 17.8 (64.0) | 20.7 (69.3) | 20.4 (68.7) | 15.3 (59.5) | 9.1 (48.4) | 3.4 (38.1) | 0.0 (32.0) | 9.6 (49.3) |
| Mean daily minimum °C (°F) | −2.8 (27.0) | −2.1 (28.2) | 0.3 (32.5) | 3.8 (38.8) | 8.0 (46.4) | 11.7 (53.1) | 14.1 (57.4) | 13.9 (57.0) | 9.7 (49.5) | 5.0 (41.0) | 0.7 (33.3) | −2.2 (28.0) | 5.0 (41.0) |
| Record low °C (°F) | −30.0 (−22.0) | −25.6 (−14.1) | −22.8 (−9.0) | −7.8 (18.0) | −3.9 (25.0) | 1.1 (34.0) | 1.7 (35.1) | 2.8 (37.0) | −1.1 (30.0) | −13.0 (8.6) | −25.0 (−13.0) | −28.3 (−18.9) | −30.0 (−22.0) |
| Average precipitation mm (inches) | 44.0 (1.73) | 22.8 (0.90) | 26.0 (1.02) | 30.9 (1.22) | 42.6 (1.68) | 43.6 (1.72) | 35.0 (1.38) | 32.3 (1.27) | 31.5 (1.24) | 31.9 (1.26) | 44.1 (1.74) | 40.5 (1.59) | 425.2 (16.75) |
| Average rainfall mm (inches) | 19.7 (0.78) | 15.0 (0.59) | 22.5 (0.89) | 30.6 (1.20) | 42.6 (1.68) | 43.6 (1.72) | 35.0 (1.38) | 32.3 (1.27) | 31.5 (1.24) | 31.7 (1.25) | 35.8 (1.41) | 16.0 (0.63) | 356.3 (14.04) |
| Average snowfall cm (inches) | 24.2 (9.5) | 7.7 (3.0) | 3.6 (1.4) | 0.3 (0.1) | 0 (0) | 0 (0) | 0 (0) | 0 (0) | 0 (0) | 0.1 (0.0) | 8.3 (3.3) | 24.5 (9.6) | 68.7 (26.9) |
| Average precipitation days (≥ 0.2 mm) | 14.4 | 8.6 | 10.1 | 10.2 | 12.7 | 11.9 | 8.9 | 7.8 | 8.8 | 11.6 | 13.5 | 12.9 | 131.4 |
| Average rainy days (≥ 0.2 mm) | 7.6 | 6.4 | 9.3 | 10.2 | 12.7 | 11.9 | 8.9 | 7.8 | 8.8 | 11.6 | 12.0 | 6.7 | 113.9 |
| Average snowy days (≥ 0.2 cm) | 7.5 | 2.7 | 1.3 | 0.16 | 0 | 0 | 0 | 0 | 0 | 0.08 | 2.5 | 7.6 | 21.84 |
Source: Environment Canada

== Images ==
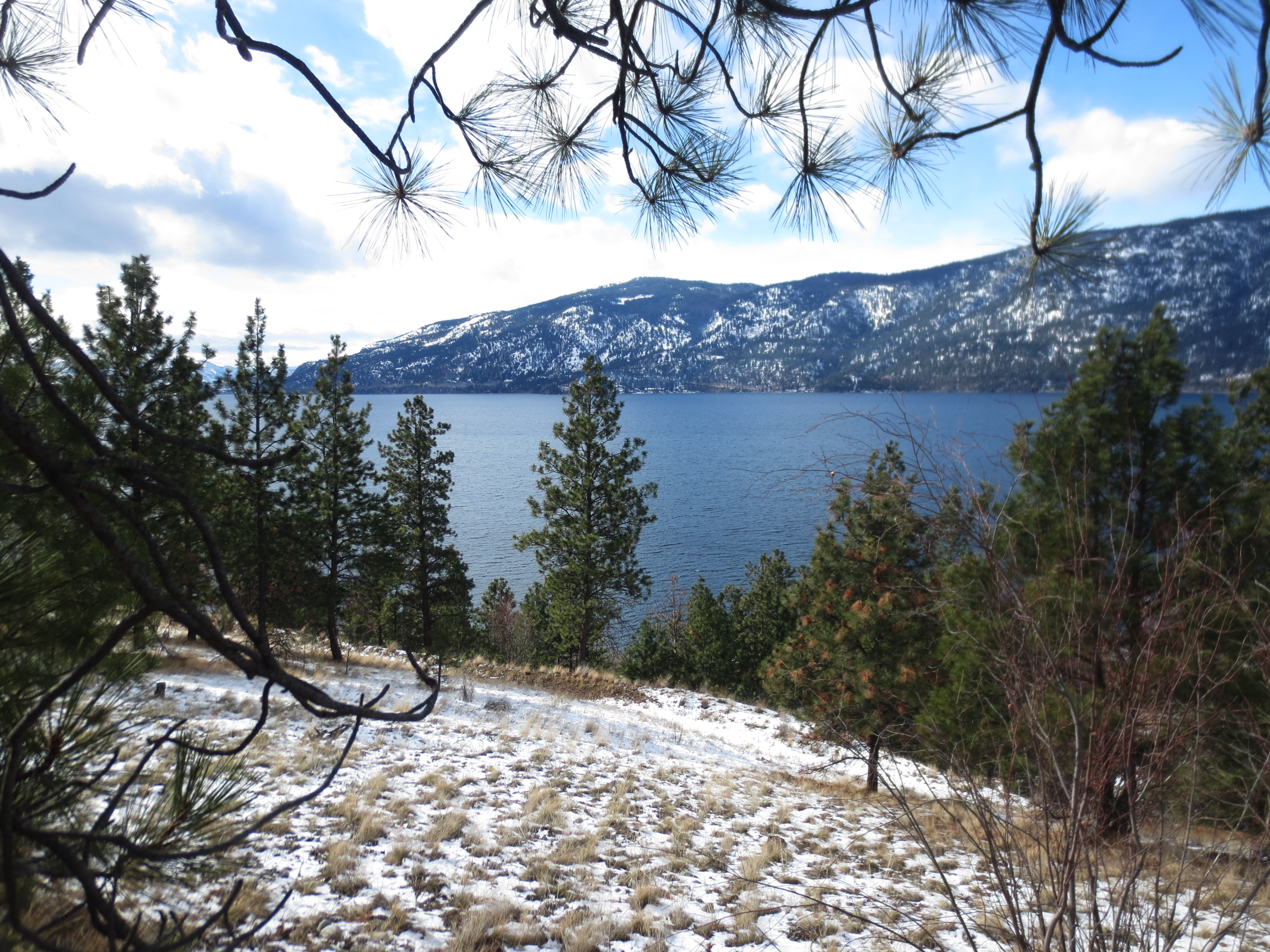
Overlooking the Lake by Okanagan Centre on a Late Winter Morning
