= Canadian production of berries =

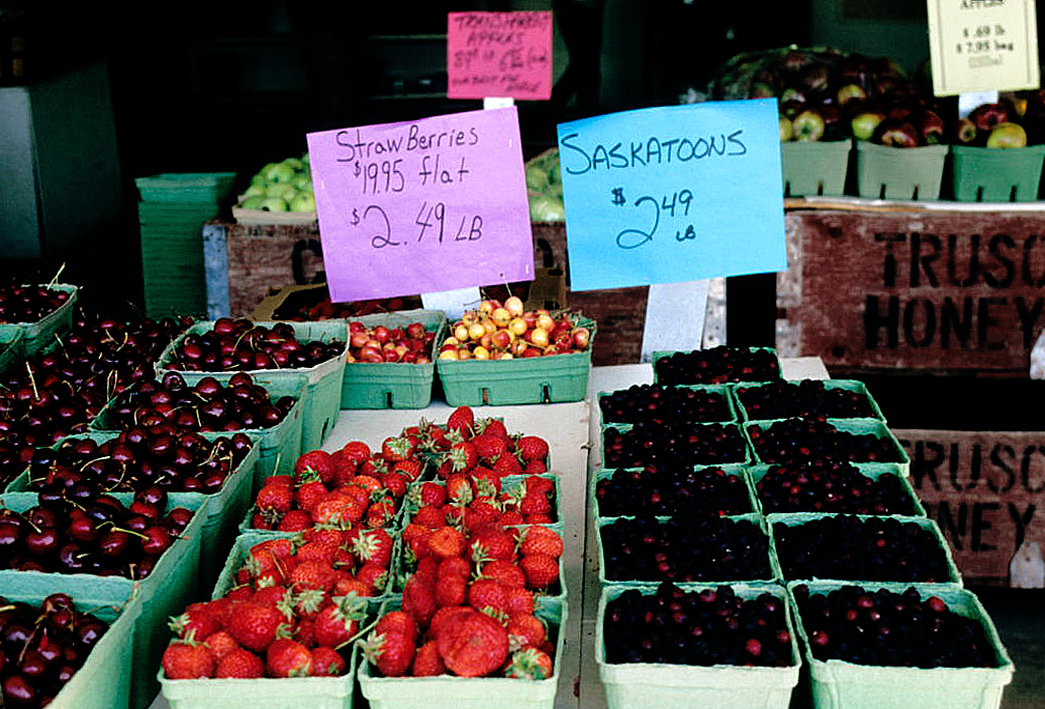
Creston, BC

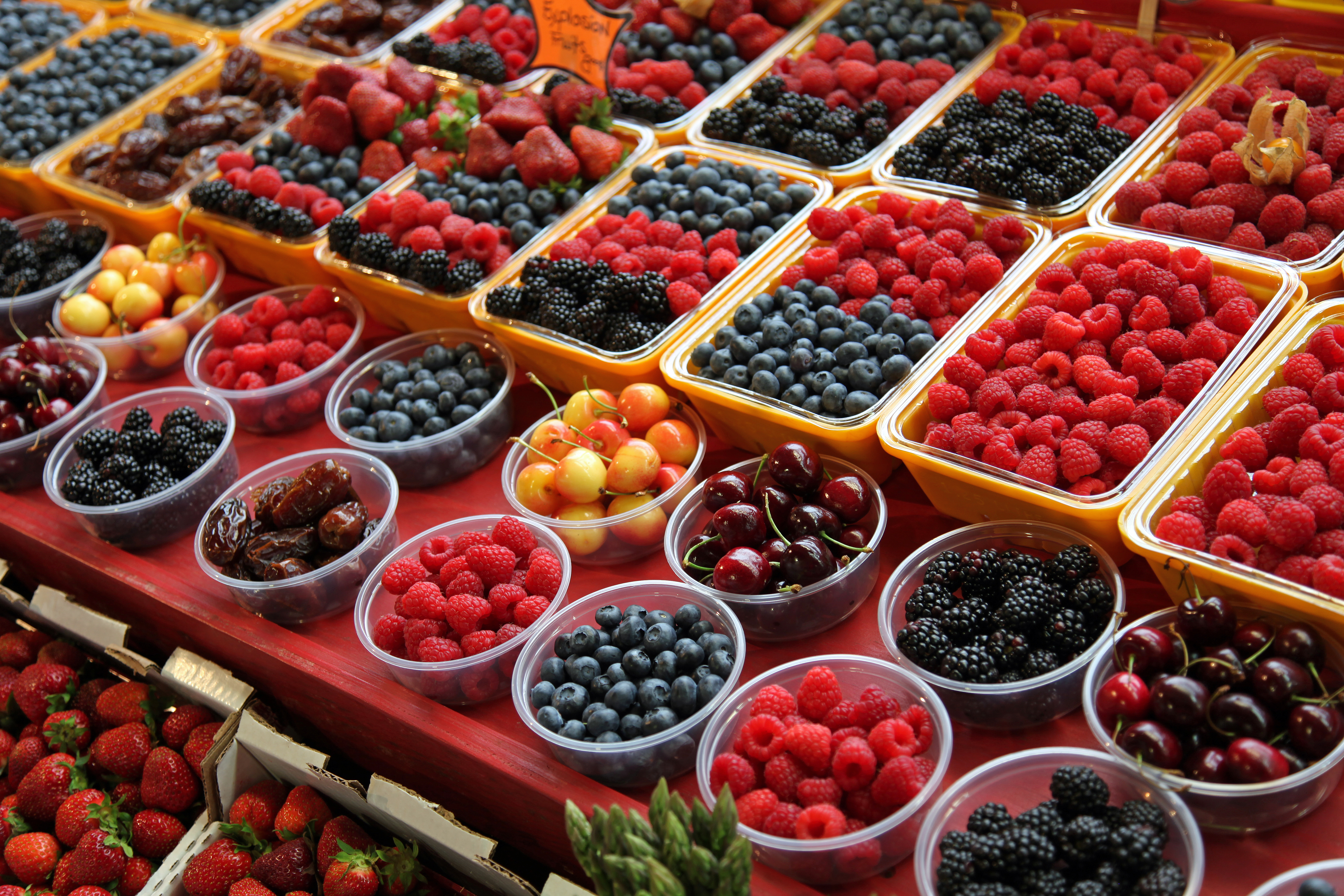
Atwater Market, Montreal, QC

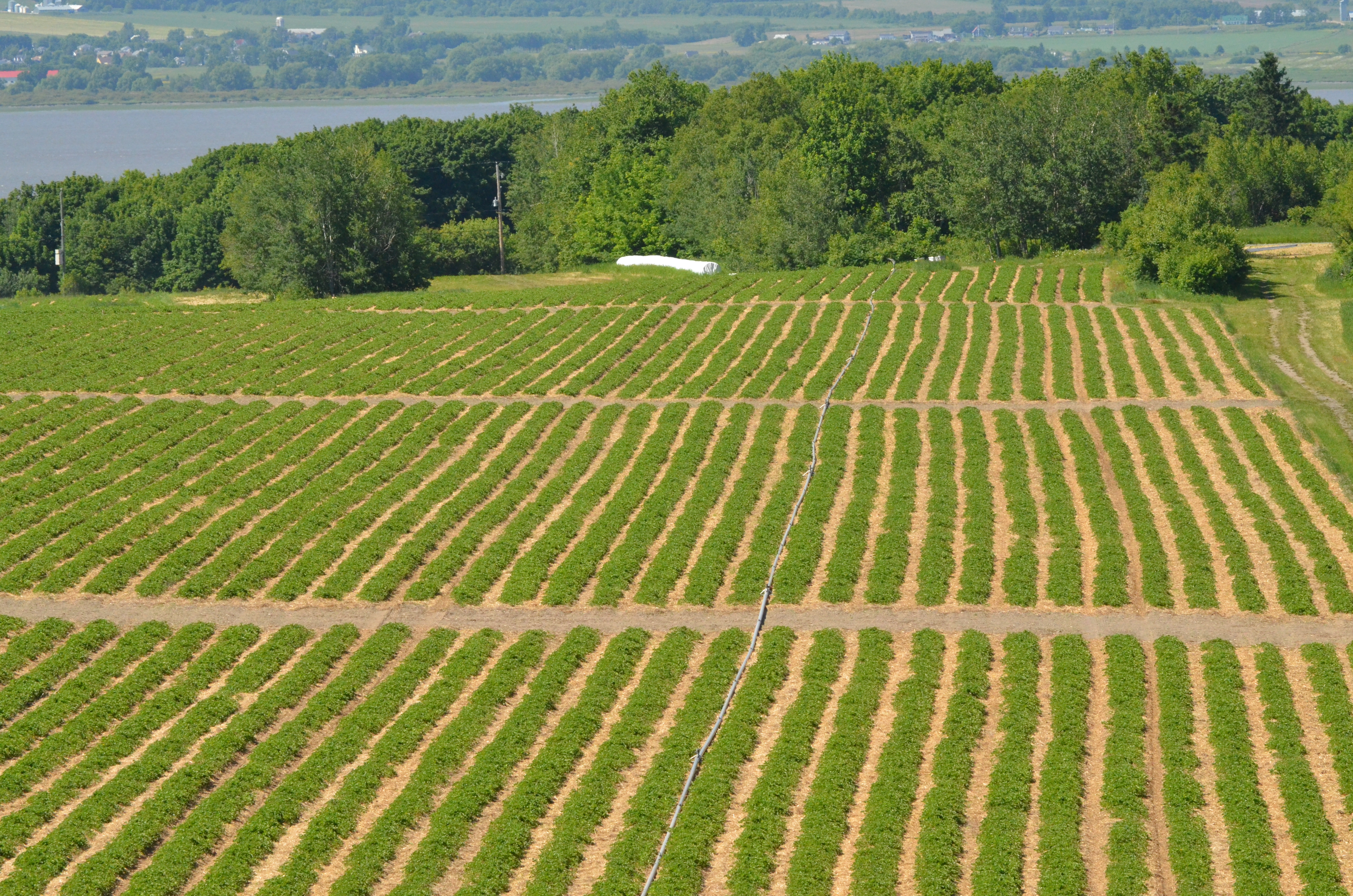
Strawberry field, Sainte-Famille, QC

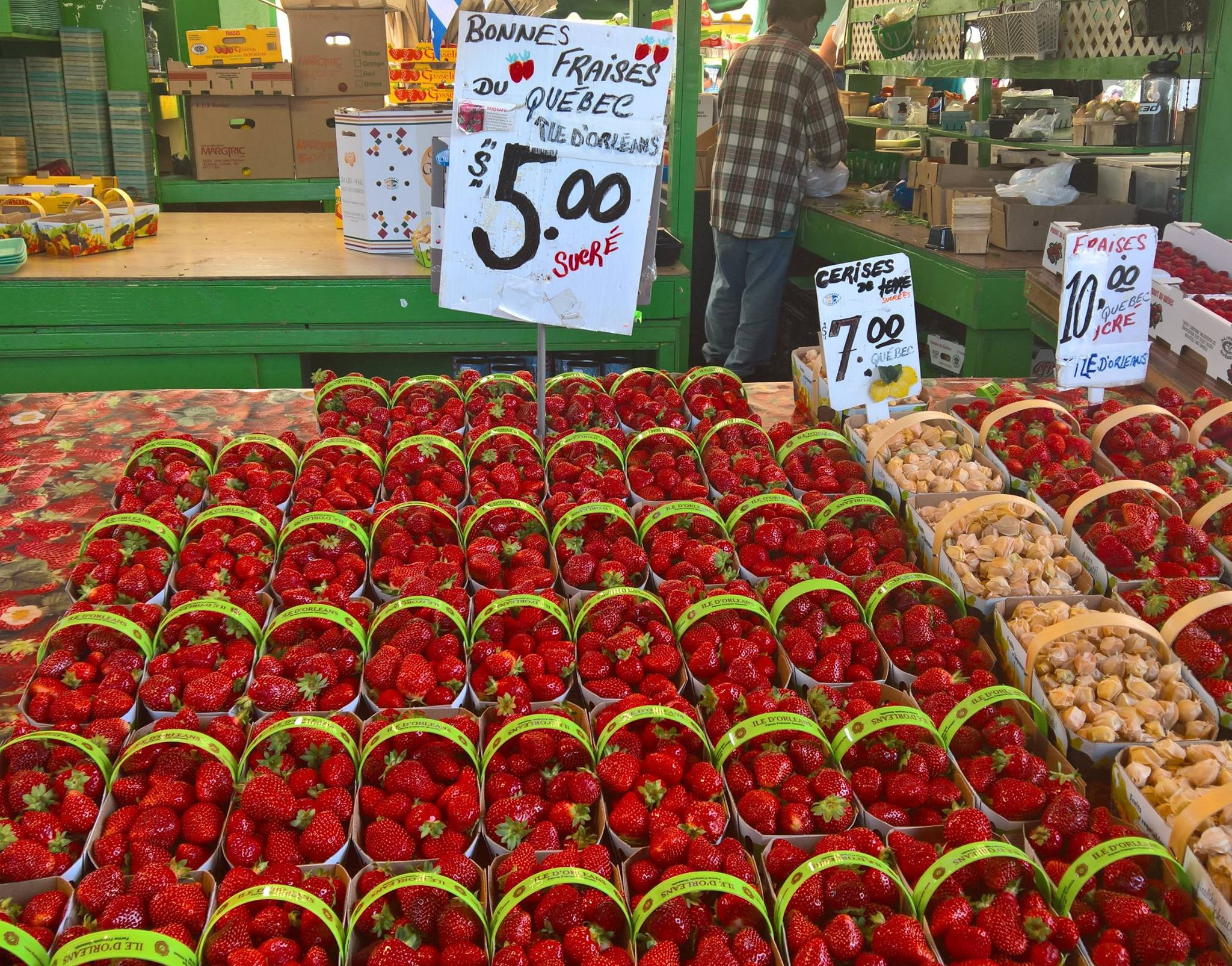
Little Italy, Montreal, QC

Berry-growing in Canada is mostly confined to its rainiest areas, although a lesser amount is grown elsewhere. Most berries are grown in southwest British Columbia, except lowbush blueberry which is almost only grown in The Maritimes. Significant amounts of strawberries are grown in southern Ontario, southern Quebec, and the southern part of the Maritimes, and smaller amounts around urban areas of the Prairies. Cranberry production has recently increased in BC and the east and as of 2016 is the second most exported berry by value at CAN$ 88,469,000. Blueberry is the most important, indeed top among all fruits in the country, by – cultivated area, 79,515 hectares (196,490 acres) – farm gate value, CAN$ 261,532,000 – and export value, CAN$ 422,441,000. Grape (in some ways a berry crop) is third by – cultivated area, 12,480 hectares (30,800 acres) – and farm gate, CAN$ 151,093,000. Cherry (sometimes grouped with berries) is third in export value at CAN$ 82,841,000

== British Columbia ==
Common crops include blueberry, strawberry (and grape, often called "berries" in the industry). The Provincial government provides information including production guides for blackberry, blueberry, cranberry, currant, gooseberry, raspberry, and strawberry.

The Pacific North West – including BC – produces much of the world's raspberries.

The Regional District of Bulkley-Nechako recommends sources for information and practices in the area.

Insurance is provided through the province.

== Manitoba ==
The industry is represented by the Prairie Fruit Growers Association, formerly the Strawberry Growers Association of Manitoba.

There is no blueberry domesticated industry. Instead semi-wild stands are planted and managed and may form the basis of a larger industry in the future.

The provincial government provides information for production of raspberry.

Saskatoonberry could be a much larger industry. There is high demand and little supply. The provincial government provides production information.

Strawberry is the berry with the largest acreage in the province. The Strawberry Growers Association of Manitoba was founded in 1972 and is now the Prairie Fruit Growers Association. The provincial government provides production information.

There is only a niche market for currant, gooseberry, highbush cranberry, pincherry, sea buckthorn, and silver buffaloberry. The government provides production recommendations for these bush fruits.

== Quebec ==
36% of the country's strawberries are grown here, the highest for any province or territory. APFFdQ recommends cultivars for the province.

APFFdQ also recommends raspberry cultivars for the province.
