= List of census metropolitan areas and agglomerations in British Columbia =

The table below lists the census metropolitan areas and agglomerations in British Columbia by population, using data from the Canada 2021 Census. Each entry is identified as a census metropolitan area (CMA) or a census agglomeration (CA), as defined by Statistics Canada.

A city's metropolitan area, in colloquial or administrative terms, may differ from its CMA as defined by Statistics Canada, resulting in differing populations. Such is the case with the Greater Toronto Area, in the separate province of Ontario, where its metropolitan population is notably higher than its respective CMA population. Statistics Canada listed 7 CMAs and 21 CAs in the Canada 2021 Census.

== Census metropolitan areas and agglomerations ==
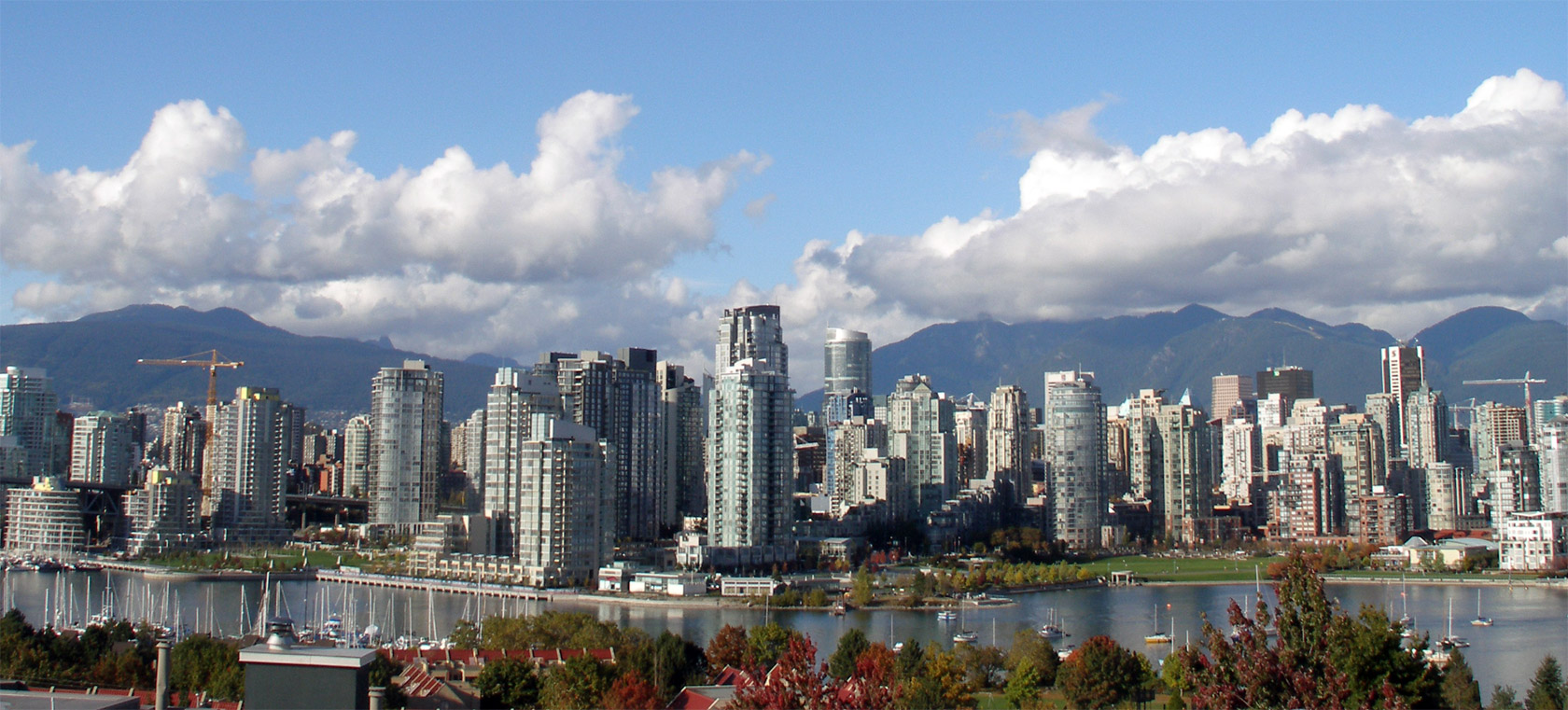
Vancouver

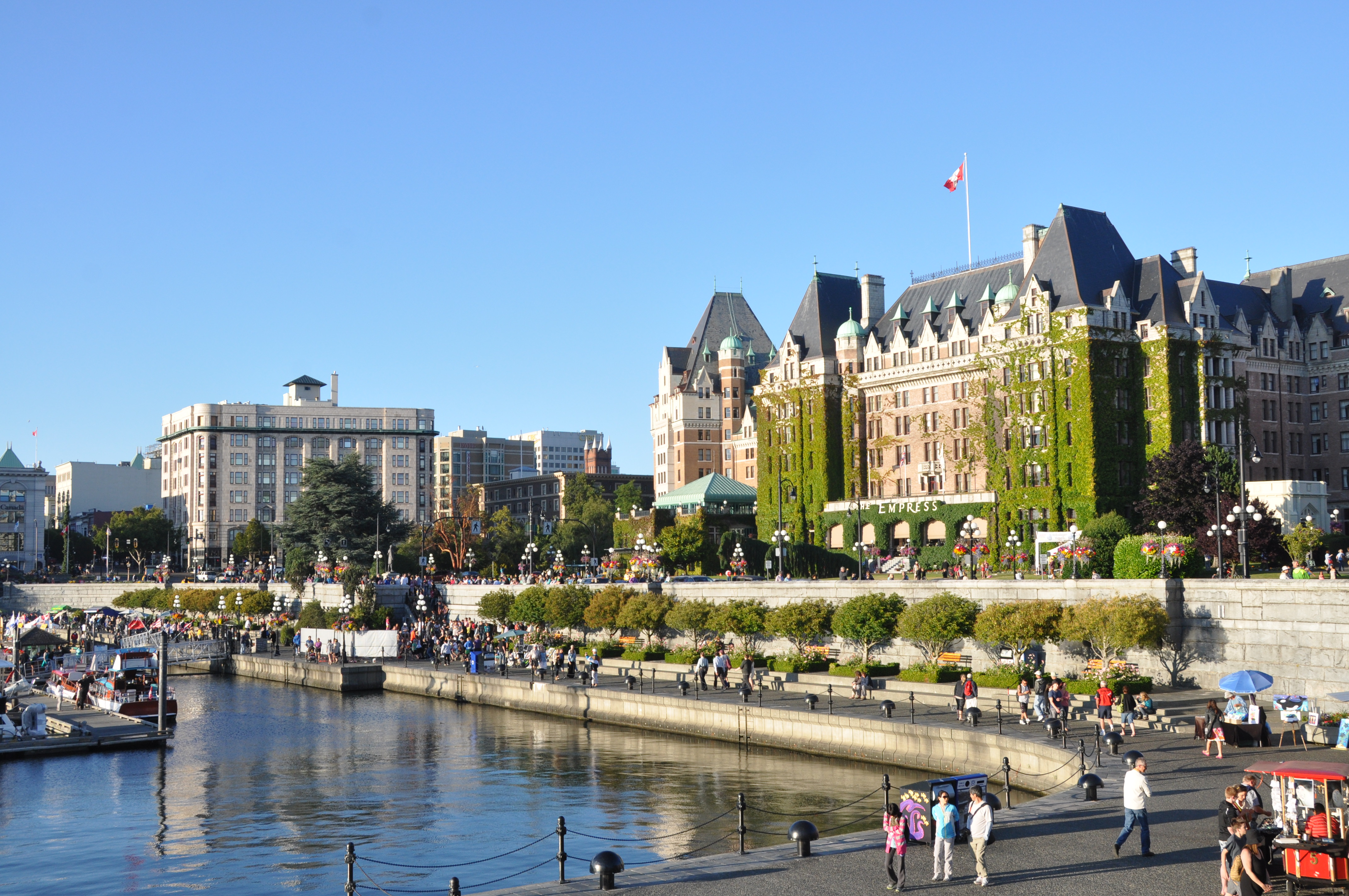
Victoria

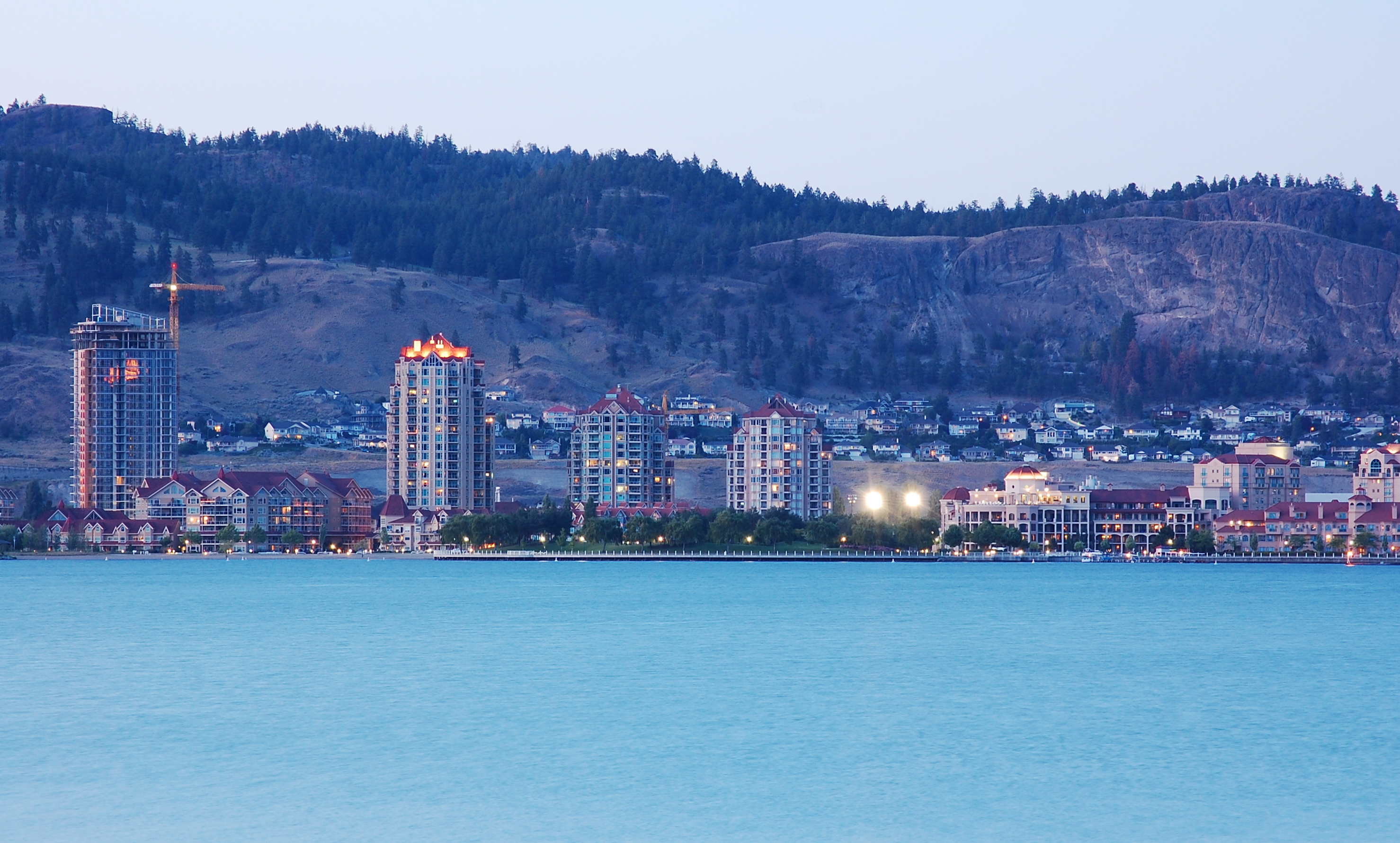
Kelowna

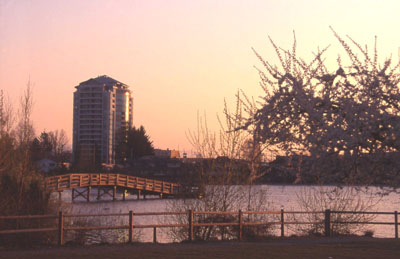
Abbotsford

List of census metropolitan areas and agglomerations in British Columbia
Rank	Geographic name	Type	2021 Census of Population				
Rank	Geographic name	Type	Population (2021)	Population (2016)	Change	Land area (km^{2})	Population density (/km^{2})
1	Vancouver	CMA	2,642,825	2,463,431	+7.3%	2,878.93	918.0
2	Victoria	CMA	397,237	367,770	+8.0%	695.29	571.3
3	Kelowna	CMA	222,162	194,892	+14.0%	2,902.45	76.5
4	Abbotsford - Mission	CMA	195,726	180,518	+8.4%	606.72	322.6
5	Nanaimo	CMA	115,459	104,936	+10.0%	1,279.28	90.3
6	Kamloops	CMA	114,142	103,811	+10.0%	5,654.08	20.2
7	Chilliwack	CMA	113,767	101,512	+12.1%	1,444.02	78.8
8	Prince George	CA	89,490	86,622	+3.3%	17,650.99	5.1
9	Vernon	CA	67,086	61,324	+9.4%	1,041.09	64.4
10	Courtenay	CA	63,282	57,950	+9.2%	624.33	101.4
11	Duncan	CA	47,582	44,451	+7.0%	373.22	127.5
12	Penticton	CA	47,380	43,534	+8.8%	1,734.72	27.3
13	Campbell River	CA	40,704	37,861	+7.5%	1,734.05	23.5
14	Parksville	CA	31,054	28,922	+7.4%	81.81	379.6
15	Fort St. John	CA	28,729	28,396	+1.2%	617.73	46.5
16	Cranbrook	CA	27,040	26,068	+3.7%	4,563.87	5.9
17	Port Alberni	CA	25,786	24,669	+4.5%	1,633.13	15.8
18	Squamish	CA	24,232	19,893	+21.8%	105.43	229.8
19	Williams Lake	CA	23,608	23,113	+2.1%	12,422.14	1.9
20	Quesnel	CA	23,113	23,146	−0.1%	21,708.62	1.1
21	Salmon Arm	CA	19,705	17,904	+10.1%	165.42	119.1
22	Terrace	CA	19,606	19,160	+2.3%	9,721.84	2.0
23	Nelson	CA	19,119	18,307	+4.4%	1,224.30	15.6
24	Dawson Creek	CA	17,878	18,890	−5.4%	11,716.80	1.5
25	Powell River	CA	17,825	16,783	+6.2%	799.80	22.3
26	Ladysmith	CA	15,501	14,572	+6.4%	412.01	37.6
27	Trail	CA	14,268	14,196	+0.5%	279.13	51.1
28	Prince Rupert	CA	13,442	13,462	−0.1%	3,303.63	4.1

== See also ==
- List of Canadian census agglomerations by province or territory
- List of census agglomerations in Canada
- List of municipalities in British Columbia
- List of population centres in British Columbia
- Population of Canada by year
