= List of population centres in British Columbia =

A population centre, in Canadian census data, is a populated place, or a cluster of interrelated populated places, which meets the demographic characteristics of an urban area, having a population of at least 1,000 people and a population density of no fewer than 400 persons per square km^{2}. All areas outside population centres are classified as rural areas.

The term was first introduced in the 2011 Canadian census; prior to that, Statistics Canada used the term urban area.

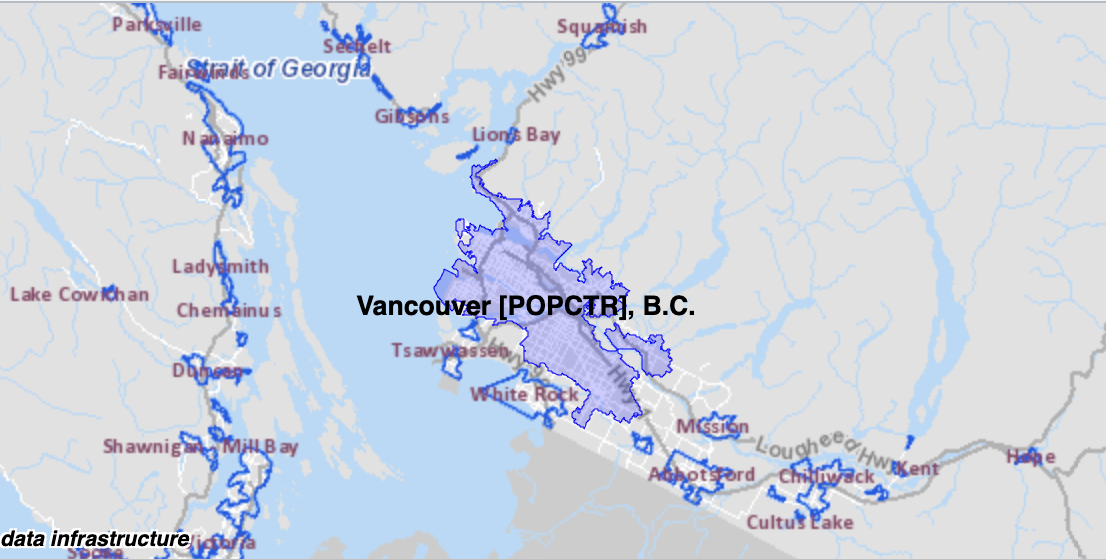
Snapshot of Southern BC population centres. Vancouver is highlighted. Does not follow municipal boundaries. More examples can be found on https://www12.statcan.gc.ca/census-recensement/2021/dp-pd/prof/search-recherche/lst/results-resultats.cfm?Lang=E&GEOCODE=59#

In the 2021 Census of Population, Statistics Canada listed 108 population centres in the province of British Columbia.

== List ==
The below table is a list of those population centres in British Columbia from the 2021 Census of Population as designated, named, and delineated by Statistics Canada.

Rank	Population centre	Size group	Population (2021)	Population (2016)	Change	Land area (km^{2})	Population density
1	Vancouver	Large urban	2,426,160	2,268,864	+6.9%	911.64	2,661.3/km^{2}
2	Victoria	Large urban	363,222	337,235	+7.7%	222.71	1,630.9/km^{2}
3	Kelowna	Large urban	181,380	160,095	+13.3%	168.92	1,073.8/km^{2}
4	Abbotsford	Large urban	132,300	122,163	+8.3%	71.2	1,858.1/km^{2}
5	White Rock	Large urban	109,167	93,811	+16.4%	54.23	2,013.0/km^{2}
6	Nanaimo	Large urban	106,079	96,415	+10.0%	86.76	1,222.7/km^{2}
7	Kamloops	Medium	92,442	85,702	+7.9%	74.35	1,243.3/km^{2}
8	Chilliwack	Medium	81,622	73,171	+11.5%	56.02	1,457.0/km^{2}
9	Prince George	Medium	67,339	66,315	+1.5%	73.9	911.2/km^{2}
10	Vernon	Medium	51,896	48,425	+7.2%	51.16	1,014.4/km^{2}
11	Courtenay	Medium	48,917	45,314	+8.0%	56.58	864.6/km^{2}
12	Campbell River	Medium	38,108	35,440	+7.5%	33	1,154.8/km^{2}
13	Penticton	Medium	36,893	33,899	+8.8%	25.84	1,427.7/km^{2}
14	Mission	Medium	36,193	33,713	+7.4%	27.23	1,329.2/km^{2}
15	Parksville	Small	27,330	25,364	+7.8%	27.45	995.6/km^{2}
16	Duncan	Small	24,358	23,559	+3.4%	22.75	1,070.7/km^{2}
17	Tsawwassen	Small	23,940	21,845	+9.6%	14.95	1,601.3/km^{2}
18	Ladner	Small	23,016	22,193	+3.7%	7.38	3,118.7/km^{2}
19	Squamish	Small	22,221	18,902	+17.6%	22.11	1,005.0/km^{2}
20	Port Alberni	Small	21,711	20,910	+3.8%	28.49	762.1/km^{2}
21	Fort St. John	Small	21,123	20,026	+5.5%	14.89	1,418.6/km^{2}
22	Cranbrook	Small	20,008	19,641	+1.9%	16.32	1,226.0/km^{2}
23	Salmon Arm	Small	16,065	14,948	+7.5%	20.99	765.4/km^{2}
24	Terrace	Small	14,633	14,327	+2.1%	22.19	659.4/km^{2}
25	Powell River	Small	13,116	12,389	+5.9%	17.37	755.1/km^{2}
26	Aldergrove	Small	13,105	12,126	+8.1%	7.03	1,864.2/km^{2}
27	Trail - Fruitvale	Small	12,863	12,736	+1.0%	21.65	594.1/km^{2}
28	Duck Lake	Small	12,725	10,085	+26.2%	24.93	510.4/km^{2}
29	Quesnel	Small	12,110	12,196	−0.7%	25.23	480.0/km^{2}
30	Williams Lake	Small	11,906	11,702	+1.7%	27.69	430.0/km^{2}
31	Prince Rupert	Small	11,814	11,733	+0.7%	7.97	1,482.3/km^{2}
32	Dawson Creek	Small	11,706	11,621	+0.7%	12.34	948.6/km^{2}
33	Sooke	Small	11,583	9,936	+16.6%	15.3	757.1/km^{2}
34	Nelson	Small	11,198	10,669	+5.0%	7.45	1,503.1/km^{2}
35	Ladysmith	Small	11,194	10,637	+5.2%	13.85	808.2/km^{2}
36	Castlegar	Small	10,029	9,592	+4.6%	19.01	527.6/km^{2}
37	Whistler	Small	9,974	8,739	+14.1%	11.74	849.6/km^{2}
38	Summerland	Small	9,860	9,466	+4.2%	15.83	622.9/km^{2}
39	Gibsons	Small	9,603	9,199	+4.4%	14.11	680.6/km^{2}
40	Sechelt	Small	9,434	8,993	+4.9%	11.96	788.8/km^{2}
41	Revelstoke	Small	7,709	7,067	+9.1%	12.3	626.7/km^{2}
42	Shawnigan - Mill Bay	Small	7,285	7,129	+2.2%	14.87	489.9/km^{2}
43	Kitimat	Small	6,727	6,822	−1.4%	4.88	1,378.5/km^{2}
44	Oliver	Small	5,708	5,437	+5.0%	5.67	1,006.7/km^{2}
45	Fernie	Small	5,519	4,860	+13.6%	4.49	1,229.2/km^{2}
46	Creston	Small	5,459	5,236	+4.3%	6.04	903.8/km^{2}
47	Armstrong	Small	5,323	5,114	+4.1%	5.22	1,019.7/km^{2}
48	Smithers	Small	5,316	5,351	−0.7%	10.46	508.2/km^{2}
49	Merritt	Small	5,248	5,321	−1.4%	4.43	1,184.7/km^{2}
50	Peachland	Small	5,006	4,698	+6.6%	9.83	509.3/km^{2}
51	Kimberley	Small	4,908	4,679	+4.9%	4.51	1,088.2/km^{2}
52	Osoyoos	Small	4,859	4,537	+7.1%	4.24	1,146.0/km^{2}
53	Aldergrove East	Small	4,496	3,491	+28.8%	2.55	1,763.1/km^{2}
54	Hope	Small	4,434	4,197	+5.6%	5.48	809.1/km^{2}
55	Cumberland	Small	4,190	3,600	+16.4%	3.91	1,071.6/km^{2}
56	Grand Forks	Small	4,166	4,100	+1.6%	8.21	507.4/km^{2}
57	Chemainus	Small	4,033	3,612	+11.7%	5.82	693.0/km^{2}
58	Sparwood	Small	3,990	3,646	+9.4%	8.61	463.4/km^{2}
59	Kent	Small	3,936	3,911	+0.6%	4.02	979.1/km^{2}
60	Rossland	Small	3,645	3,416	+6.7%	4.01	909.0/km^{2}
61	Golden	Small	3,640	3,403	+7.0%	6.12	594.8/km^{2}
62	Cobble Hill	Small	3,610	3,580	+0.8%	6.67	541.2/km^{2}
63	Port Hardy	Small	3,393	3,643	−6.9%	5.15	658.8/km^{2}
64	Invermere	Small	3,340	2,911	+14.7%	3.44	970.9/km^{2}
65	Lake Cowichan	Small	3,181	3,089	+3.0%	4.14	768.4/km^{2}
66	Enderby	Small	3,028	2,964	+2.2%	4.26	710.8/km^{2}
67	Pemberton	Small	2,970	2,269	+30.9%	2.82	1,053.2/km^{2}
68	Mackenzie	Small	2,856	3,262	−12.4%	3.43	832.7/km^{2}
69	Princeton	Small	2,826	2,745	+3.0%	4.48	630.8/km^{2}
70	Cowichan Bay	Small	2,799	2,557	+9.5%	4.47	626.2/km^{2}
71	Fort Nelson	Small	2,611	3,371	−22.5%	5.02	520.1/km^{2}
72	Tumbler Ridge	Small	2,389	1,987	+20.2%	2.95	809.8/km^{2}
73	Chase	Small	2,377	2,263	+5.0%	2.33	1,020.2/km^{2}
74	Blind Bay	Small	2,369	2,113	+12.1%	4.14	572.2/km^{2}
75	Port McNeill	Small	2,234	2,219	+0.7%	2.49	897.2/km^{2}
76	Rosedale	Small	2,232	1,894	+17.8%	4.39	508.4/km^{2}
77	Tofino	Small	2,217	1,736	+27.7%	5.47	405.3/km^{2}
78	Okanagan Falls	Small	2,202	2,167	+1.6%	3.33	661.3/km^{2}
79	Burns Lake	Small	2,117	1,942	+9.0%	3.12	678.5/km^{2}
80	Houston	Small	2,085	2,126	−1.9%	2.94	709.2/km^{2}
81	Sicamous	Small	2,041	1,786	+14.3%	2.63	776.0/km^{2}
82	Vanderhoof	Small	1,967	1,979	−0.6%	2.85	690.2/km^{2}
83	Ucluelet	Small	1,940	1,613	+20.3%	2.9	669.0/km^{2}
84	Rayleigh	Small	1,933	1,951	−0.9%	2.06	938.3/km^{2}
85	Roberts Creek	Small	1,927	1,898	+1.5%	4.18	461.0/km^{2}
86	Elkford	Small	1,908	1,788	+6.7%	3.07	621.5/km^{2}
87	Keremeos	Small	1,791	1,714	+4.5%	2.84	630.6/km^{2}
88	One Hundred Mile House	Small	1,706	1,811	−5.8%	2.4	710.8/km^{2}
89	Lillooet	Small	1,652	1,570	+5.2%	2.37	697.0/km^{2}
90	Harrison Hot Springs	Small	1,552	1,242	+25.0%	1.17	1,326.5/km^{2}
91	Fort St. James	Small	1,497	1,721	−13.0%	3.22	464.9/km^{2}
92	Lumby	Small	1,484	1,303	+13.9%	1.14	1,301.8/km^{2}
93	Crofton	Small	1,446	1,373	+5.3%	2.76	523.9/km^{2}
94	Miller's Landing	Small	1,437	1,230	+16.8%	1.91	752.4/km^{2}
95	Lions Bay	Small	1,390	1,334	+4.2%	2.53	549.4/km^{2}
96	Yarrow	Small	1,378	1,257	+9.6%	3.37	408.9/km^{2}
97	Logan Lake	Small	1,356	1,208	+12.3%	0.94	1,442.6/km^{2}
98	Telkwa	Small	1,288	1,160	+11.0%	2.86	450.3/km^{2}
99	Barriere	Small	1,273	1,169	+8.9%	3.09	412.0/km^{2}
100	Fairwinds	Small	1,207	1,147	+5.2%	2.13	566.7/km^{2}
101	Puntledge	Small	1,185	1,191	−0.5%	2.95	401.7/km^{2}
102	Ashcroft	Small	1,182	1,084	+9.0%	2.05	576.6/km^{2}
103	Cultus Lake	Small	1,164	1,053	+10.5%	1.8	646.7/km^{2}
104	Salmo	Small	1,140	1,141	−0.1%	2.44	467.2/km^{2}
105	Welcome Beach	Small	1,116	1,125	−0.8%	1.41	791.5/km^{2}
106	Nakusp	Small	1,112	1,135	−2.0%	1.31	848.9/km^{2}
107	Mile 108 Recreational Ranch	Small	1,043	1,018	+2.5%	2.59	402.7/km^{2}
108	Naramata	Small	1,012	1,013	−0.1%	2.39	423.4/km^{2}

== See also ==
- List of the largest population centres in Canada
