= Economy of British Columbia =

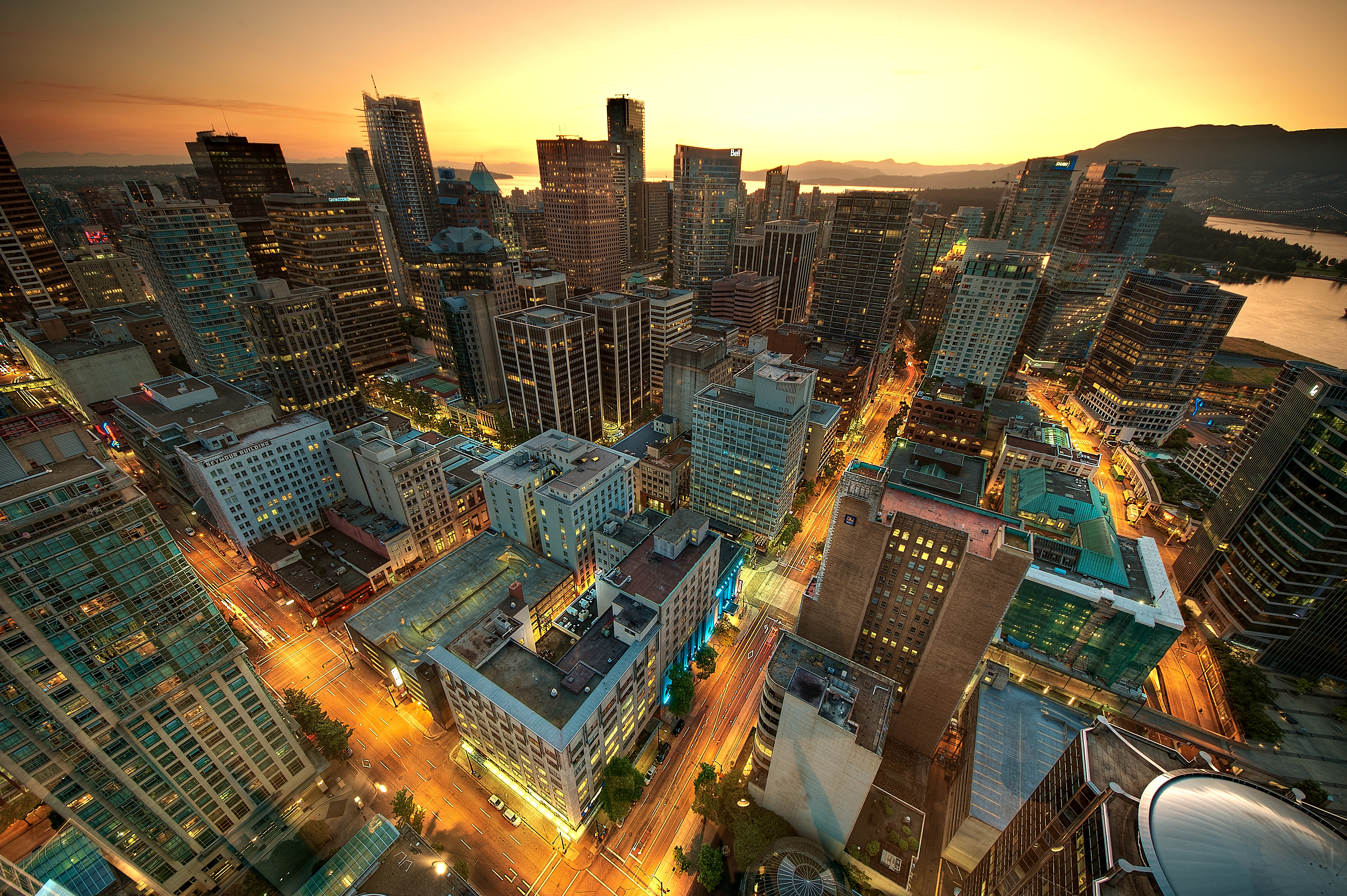
- Vancouver is a major economic hub of British Columbia.
- Currency: Canadian Dollar (CAD)
- Fiscal year: April 1 – March 31

Statistics
- Population: 5,000,879 (2021)
- GDP: 350,598 billion CAD (2021)
- Inflation (CPI): 3.5% (June 2023)
- Human Development Index: 0.944
- Labour force: 2,942,100
- Unemployment: 5.6% (163,900) (June 2023)
- Average gross salary: $40,800
- Average net salary: $37,200
- All values, unless otherwise stated, are in US dollars.

British Columbia (B.C.) is the third largest Canadian province by population and fourth largest provincial economy. Like other provinces in the Canadian federation, B.C. consists of both private and public institutions. However, as Canada's westernmost province, located between the Pacific Ocean and the Rocky Mountains, B.C. has unique economic characteristics that distinguish it from much of the rest of Canada.

== Economic geography ==
Geography has played a significant role in the province's economic development. B.C.’s location on Canada's west coast puts it at the commercial crossroads of the Asia-Pacific region and North America.

B.C. is geographically characterized by mountainous topography along with substantial areas of lowlands and plateaus. Though less than 5% of B.C.’s land is arable due to mostly mountainous terrain, the province is agriculturally rich. This can be attributed to relatively mild weather along the Pacific Northwestern coast and in various sheltered valleys.

There are eight economic regions within B.C. This includes: the Cariboo, Kootenay, Lower Mainland/Southwest, Nechako, North Coast, Northeast, Vancouver Island and Coast, and Thompson/Okanagan region. In addition to the many towns and cities in these regions, the province is home to over 200 First Nations.

According to the 2021 census, 85% of the population is classified as urban and is highly concentrated along B.C.’s southern coast. Around 60% of B.C.’s population resides in the Mainland/Southwest region which includes the City of Vancouver. West of the Lower Mainland across the Strait of Georgia lies Vancouver Island, which encompasses approximately 20% of the population, including Victoria, the provincial capital.

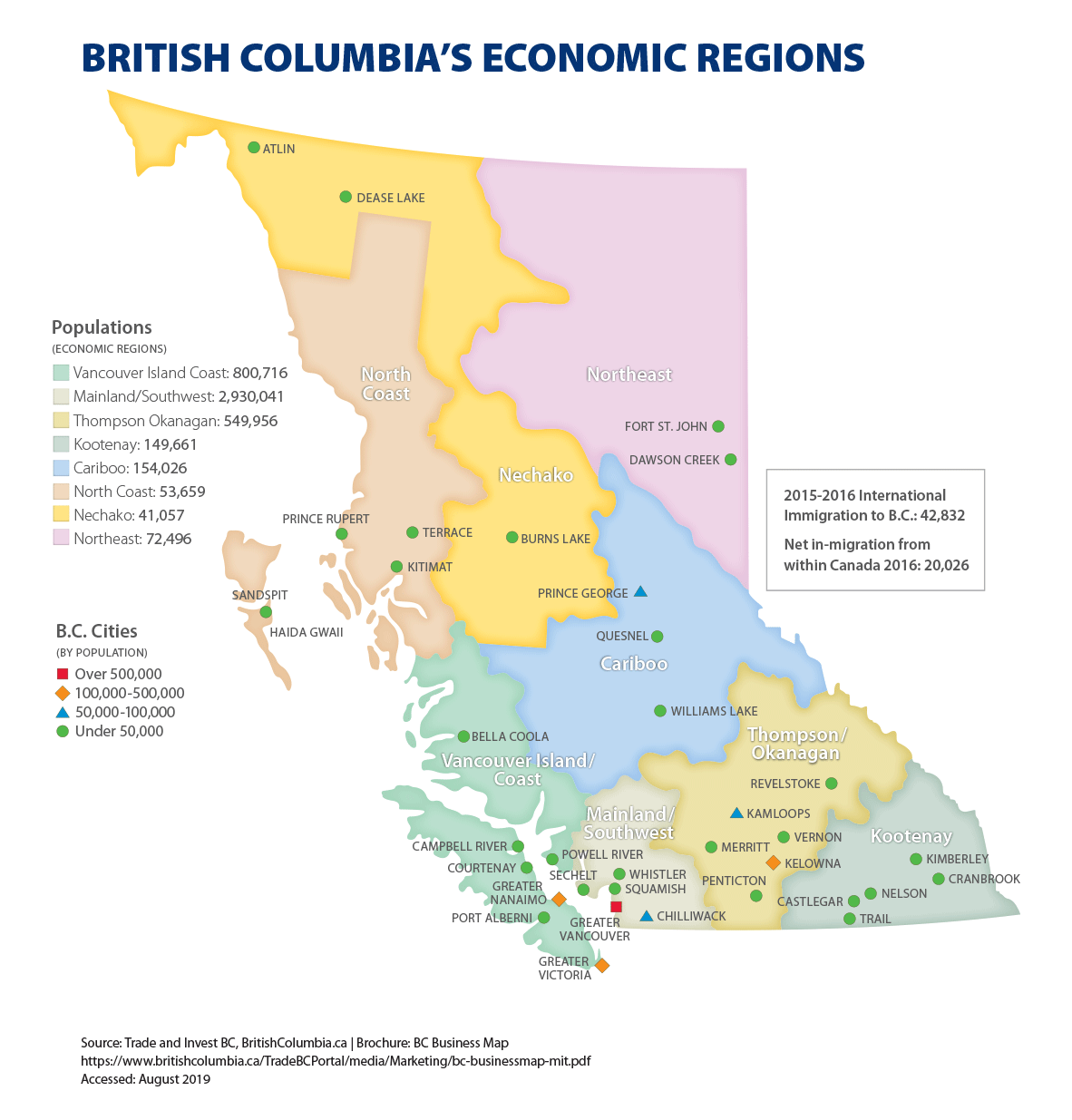
British Columbia's Economic Regions.

While service-based industries dominate its cities, resource-based sectors—principally forestry, agriculture, natural gas and mining, figure prominently as economic activities in less urbanized areas.

== Economic history ==
Indigenous peoples have lived in the area now known as B.C. for more than 10,000 years, where economic activities centred around fishing, hunting and food gathering. The area was home to thousands of Indigenous peoples when European explorers began to visit in the 1750s. However, the area was difficult for early Europeans to reach, so it was the last part of North America to be explored.

It was not until the first half of the 19th century that the Hudson's Bay Company expanded to the west of the Rocky Mountains and established trading outposts. The company traded with Indigenous tribes for sea otter pelts and animal furs. In 1849, Vancouver Island was colonized by the British and a lease was granted to the Hudson's Bay Company giving it exclusive trading rights on Vancouver Island. Soon after, the Gold Rush attracted tens of thousands of people to the interior areas of the province. B.C. remained a British colony until 1871 when it became a province of Canada. In 1885, the Canadian Pacific Railway was completed, linking the country from east to west. The railway increased trade and the movement of people and resources from the Atlantic to the Pacific.

Around the turn of the 20th century, entrepreneurs came to B.C. to develop the province's vast natural resources and agricultural potential, ushering a period of rapid economic expansion and population growth. Major dams were built to support a growing electrical grid and the Trans-Canada Highway was completed, allowing for easier movement of goods and services. As population increased, it became concentrated around the ports in the southwest part of the province. Management and financial activities related to resource development remained in these coastal cities during this time, including Vancouver. Consumer-goods manufacturing also began in southwestern cities, due in part, to the high cost of transporting manufactured goods from eastern Canada and the US at the time.

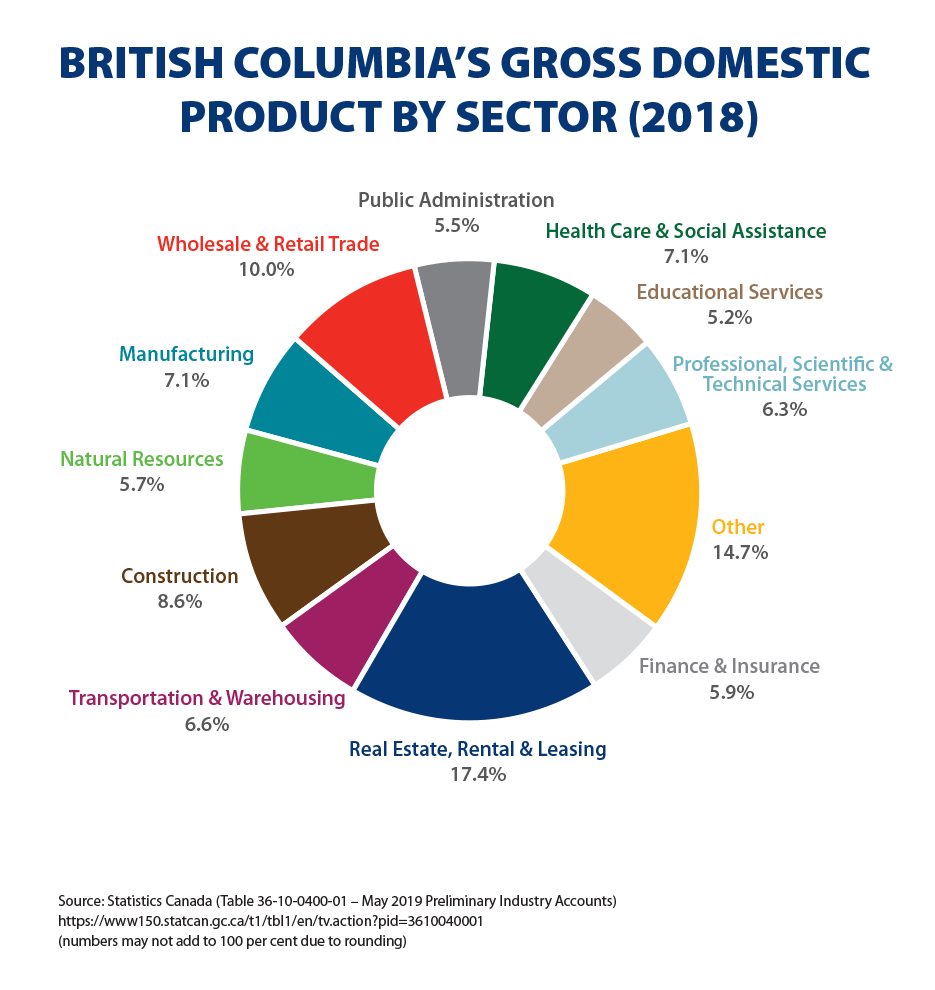
British Columbia's Gross Domestic Product (GDP) by Sector, 2018 British Columbia's (B.C.)

British Columbia has historically been a resource-dominated economy centred on the forest industry, with fluctuating importance in mining, farming and natural gas. About 60% of British Columbia is forested, accounting for approximately 19.5% of the forested land in Canada. Today however, B.C.'s economy is more diverse, with service industries accounting for the largest portion (75%) of the province's gross domestic product (GDP). Over the past several decades, employment in resource industries has fallen steadily as a percentage of employment, and new job growth has occurred mostly in the construction, real estate, leasing and rental, and the retail/service sectors.

== Key economic indicators ==
British Columbia key economic indicators
Metric	2022	2021	2020
GDP and Trade			
Gross Domestic Product – GDP (Millions of CAD dollars)	$322,862	$311,143	$290,575
Real GDP (% change)	3.8	7.1	(3.1)
Trade Exports (% change)	6.4	6.4	(10.2)
Trade Imports (% change)	8.0	8.8	(7.4)
Labour			
Unemployment Rate (%)	4.6	6.6	9.1
Labour Force (% change)	1.0	3.3	(1.9)
Prices and Consumer Expenditures			
Consumer Price Index (% change)	6.9	2.8	0.8
Population and Migration			
Population	5,319,000	5,202,000	5,155,000
International Migration (people)	150,783	67,561	(1,651)
Interprovincial Migration (people)	481	27,225	19,304

2023 B.C. Financial and Economy Review, Government of British Columbia

Statistics Canada Table: 36-10-0222-01 Gross domestic product, expenditure-based, provincial, territorial, annual

== Economic infrastructure ==
=== Transportation ===
==== Air ====
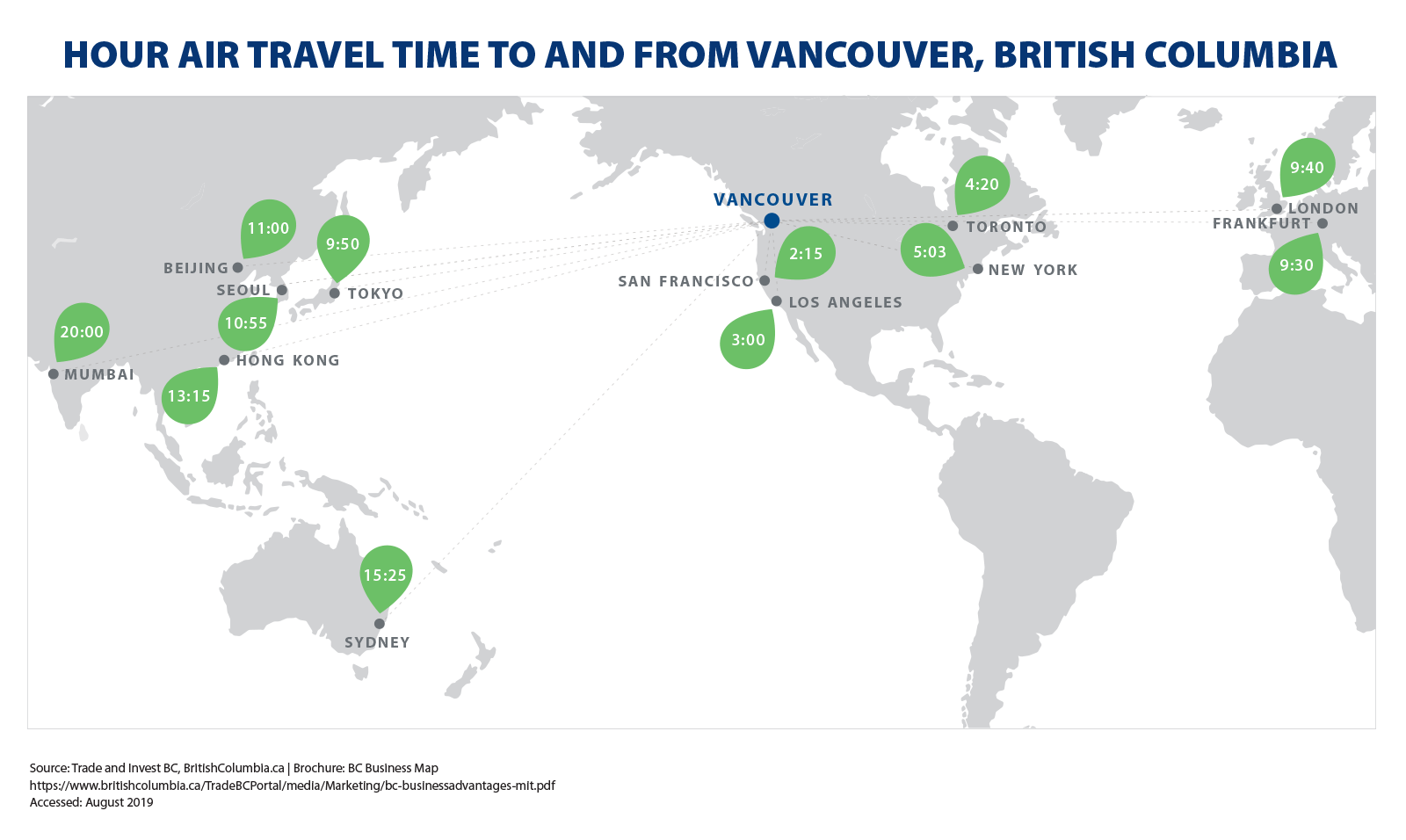
Hour Air Travel Time To And From Vancouver, British Columbia (B.C.)

B.C. has six international airports, including: Victoria (YYJ), Vancouver (YVR), Kelowna (YLW), Abbotsford (YXX), Cranbrook (YXC) and Prince George International Airports (YXS).

==== Railways, Highways and Roads ====
British Columbia is the only gateway on the west coast of the Americas served by three continental Class 1 railways (Canadian National, Canadian Pacific, and BNSF), connecting ports on the Atlantic, Pacific and Gulf coasts to key markets throughout Canada, the United States and Mexico. British Columbia has six railways crossings into the United States.

The provincial highway and railway network makes transporting goods and services to North American markets reliable. The highway system allows trucking across Canada and access to interstate highways in the United States. Computerized traffic management and integrated rail-truck terminals ensure effective freight transfer.

==== Sea ====
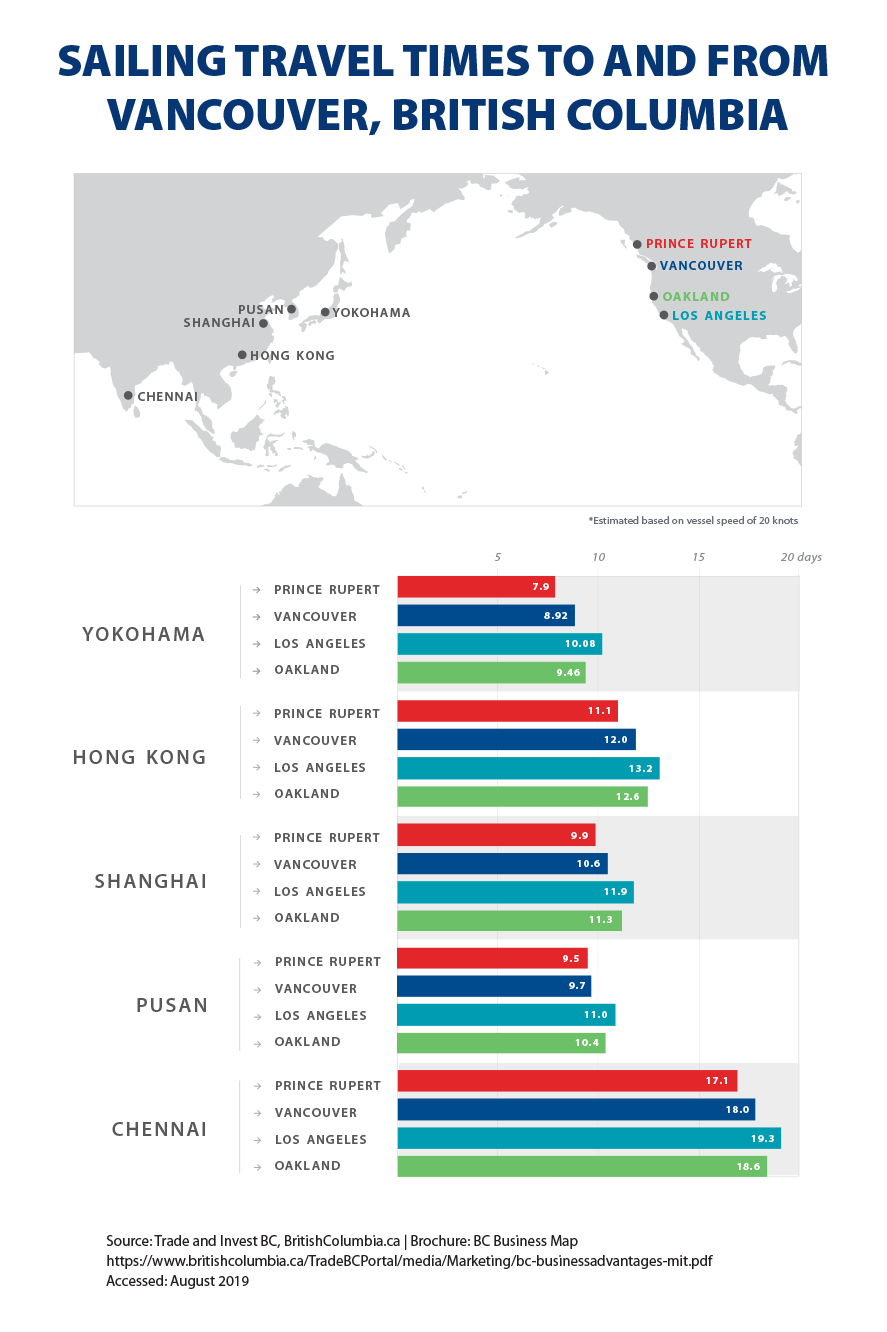
Sailing Travel Times To and From Vancouver, British Columbia (B.C.)

The Port of Vancouver is Canada's largest port and the third largest port in North America; it is responsible for Canada's trade with more than 170 world economies. The ports of Vancouver and Prince Rupert, which are ice-free year-round, are Asia's closest ports of entry on the west coast of North America—saving shippers more than two days travel time as compared to other west coast ports.

=== Energy ===
More than 98% of the electricity generated in British Columbia comes from clean or renewable resources. Electricity rates in British Columbia are also among the lowest in North America.

British Columbia also has an abundance of natural gas, estimated at over 2,900 trillion cubic feet of marketable shale gas reserves. For more than 50 years B.C. has ranked second only to Alberta in natural gas production in Canada. In recent years, B.C. has begun to expand natural gas export capacity to markets beyond North America in the form of liquefied natural gas (LNG) that can be shipped to Asia.

In 2018, the Government of British Columbia launched CleanBC, a plan to reduce emissions, advance the clean tech sector and grow B.C.’s low-carbon economy.

=== Communications and networks ===
British Columbia has the highest rate of broadband and overall Internet connectivity in Canada. An extensive fiber-optic network and LTE services span the province. However, due to predominantly mountainous terrain, many sparsely populated areas of the province offer no cellphone or internet services. An advanced communications infrastructure also provides telephone, broadcasting, cable, wireless and other information services.

=== Health and education ===
B.C.’s education system includes 25 public post-secondary institutions with 165 campuses, satellites or learning centres, including 6 research universities. There are also 350 private career training institutions with more than 50,000 students attending yearly. British Columbia's trades training system currently serves more than 38,000 apprentices. The quality of education in British Columbia is considered very high and Canada has the highest proportion of working-age adults who have been through higher education among developed countries in the world.

The B.C. Ministry of Health is a provincial government body responsible for the administration of British Columbia's public health system. The ministry works with health authorities, health care providers, agencies and other organizations to guide and enhance the province's health services. The quality of healthcare in British Columbia is relatively similar to other Canadian provinces. In Canada, public health insurance is available to all eligible Canadian citizens and permanent residents who can apply for provincial health coverage. In B.C., public health insurance is called the Medical Services Plan (MSP) and is managed by the Ministry of Health.

=== Government and institutions ===
Canada, and in turn, British Columbia's system of government, is based on the British parliamentary model. Exclusive legislative powers are delineated between federal and provincial levels of government as defined by the Constitution of Canada. Municipal powers are delegated by each respective provincial legislature.

Legal tender used in B.C. is the Canadian Dollar, managed at the federal level by the Bank of Canada, which is also responsible for oversight of the Canadian financial system, including banking and monetary policies.

The B.C. government's annual budget is tabled for debate and vote in the provincial legislature every year in February. The Budget and Fiscal Plan is the main budget document that outlines the Province's three-year fiscal plan, including economic outlook, revenues, spending, tax measures, risks forecast and assumptions. The fiscal year runs from April to March. Healthcare, education and social development programs have historically been the largest B.C. government expenditures.

British Columbia's general corporate income tax rate is 12%. When combined with the federal rate, B.C. businesses pay a general corporate income tax rate of 27%. B.C. has the lowest provincial personal income taxes in Canada for single individuals earning up to $125,000 (CAD). The sales tax rate for purchased retail goods in B.C. is 7% (PST). Both goods and services are also subject to a federal goods and services tax of 5% (GST).

B.C. has one of the highest credit ratings among Canadian provinces, reflecting a strong balance sheet and depth and diversity of a fiscally stable economy. Agencies such as Moody's, Standard and Poor's, and Fitch rate B.C.’s debt as AAA and stable. As of March 2019, total provincial government debt stood at $66.0 (CAD) billion – representing 22.3% of B.C.’s nominal GDP.

== Trade and investment ==
=== Trade agreements ===
Companies with operations in British Columbia enjoy duty-free access to the world's largest marketplaces in Asia, North America and Europe thanks to the Comprehensive and Progressive Agreement for Trans Pacific Partnership (CPTPP), the North American Free Trade Agreement (NAFTA) and the Canada-EU Comprehensive Economic and Trade Agreement (CETA). In 2018, Canada, the US and Mexico negotiated a new trade agreement to supersede NAFTA, the Canada-United States-Mexico Agreement (CUSMA, also known as USMCA) which currently awaits ratification by governments of Canada and the United States.

Domestically, British Columbia, is a member of the New West Partnership Trade Agreement, which creates a single economic region encompassing British Columbia, Alberta, Saskatchewan and Manitoba: a marketplace of more than 11 million people and a GDP of more than $700 billion.

=== Exports ===
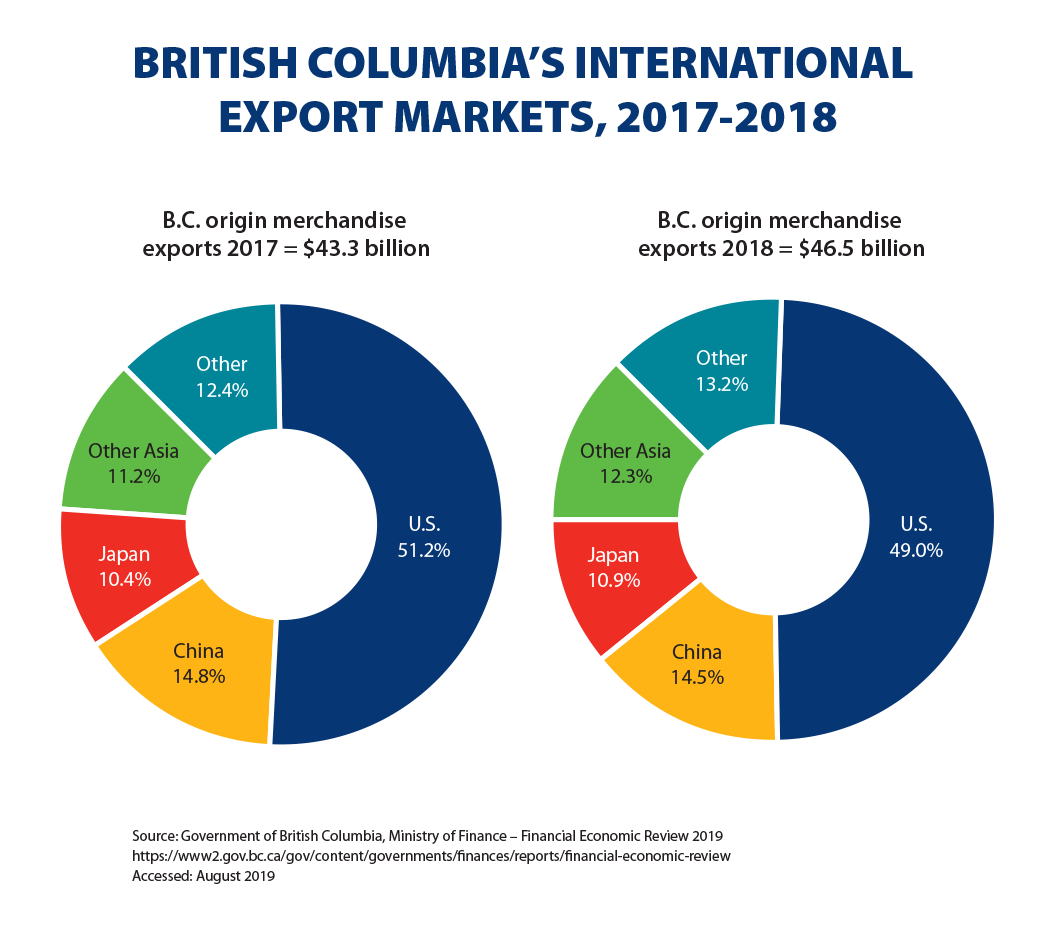
British Columbia's (B.C.) International Export Markets, 2017–2018

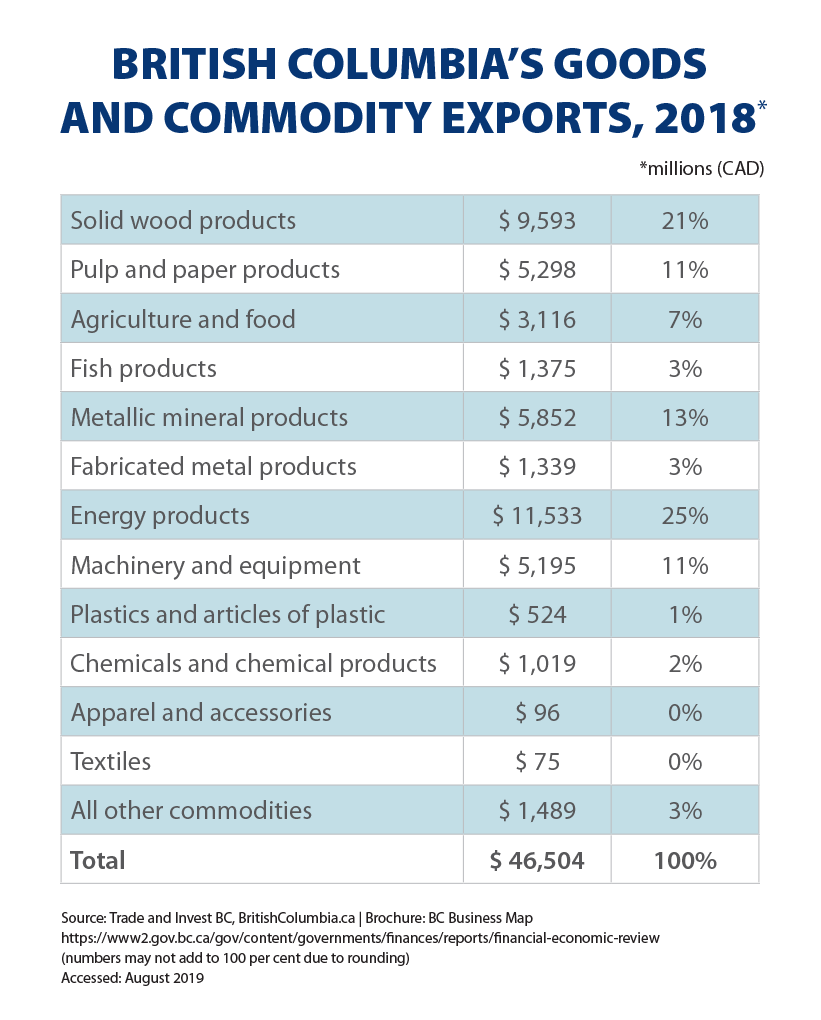
British Columbia's Goods and Commodity Exports, 2018

British Columbia is an important hub for goods shipped to and from Asia, and as a result, B.C.’s export markets are more diversified than Canada and other provinces. While Canada typically sees over three-quarters of exports flow to the US, this market accounts for just over half of British Columbia exports. Other key markets for the province include China (15%), Japan (11%) and other Asian countries (12%). The diversification of sectors and markets reduces the vulnerability of the B.C. provincial economy from sector-specific or trading partner-specific negative impacts.

=== Foreign direct investment ===
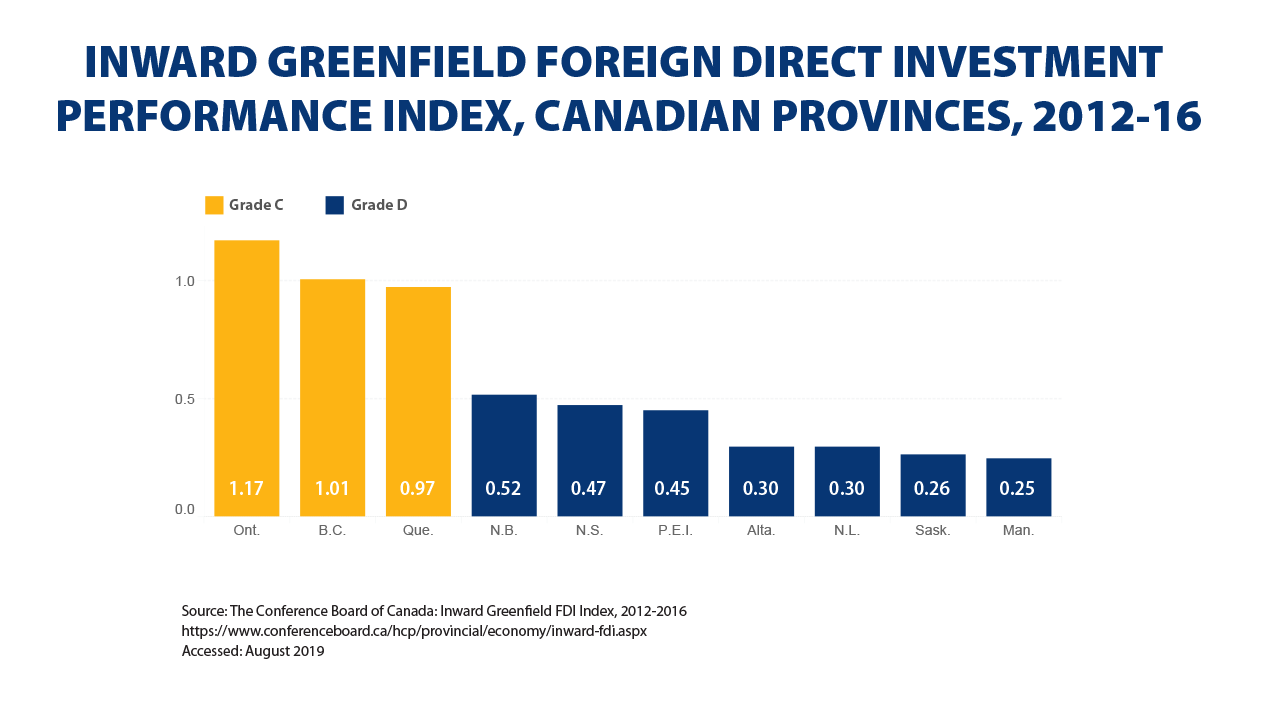
Inward Greenfield Foreign Direct Investment Performance Index, Canadian Provinces 2012–16

B.C. relies on foreign direct investment (FDI) to help drive economic growth. FDI enhances the ability of businesses and countries to expand capacity, resulting in more economic activity, more jobs, new sources of tax revenue, and gains in income. From 2012 to 2016, B.C. ranked second only to the province of Ontario in attracting FDI in Canada.

In 2019, half of inward FDI in Canada came from the United States. Investments from Asia have increased and now account for 10% of FDI in Canada, significantly weighted in the energy and natural resource sectors.

The B.C. provincial government promotes exports and FDI through a physical network of trade and investment offices around the world and through digital engagement.

== Labour force ==
The province is home to a diverse and skilled workforce, characterized as being:

- Highly educated, with more than 60% having taken post-secondary education and well over a quarter possessing a university degree.
- Flexible, with more than 80% employed in service industries, including a quarter in professional, educational and business support services.
- Multilingual, with more than 400,000 British Columbia workers identifying one of the Chinese dialects as their first language. Another 139,000 have Punjabi as their first language. 52,000 identify themselves as speaking Korean.

Over the next decade, demand for workers is expected to surpass supply in B.C. Several industries are expected to offer particularly strong job opportunities:

- Green technology, digital media and life sciences,
- Traditional industries such as natural resources,
- Service industries, including healthcare, high-tech and retail sales.

The mandatory minimum wage in B.C. is $17.85 an hour as of June 1st, 2025.

While the province attracts a healthy inflow of immigrants to help grow its labour force through government programs, attracting and retaining skilled workplace resources in cities with very high housing costs, poses a challenge for many B.C. businesses.

== Economic well-being ==
Due to a stable, sustainable economy, British Columbia compares favourably when evaluating key livability statistics. A temperate climate, cosmopolitan and culturally diverse cities, social stability, high-quality health care and education, and an abundant natural environment result in a quality of life and economic well-being that attract people to B.C. from around the world.

The Mercer Human Resource Consulting Group's 2019 Quality of Living Survey ranks Vancouver first in North America and third out of 231 cities worldwide. The Economist Intelligence Unit (EIU), an affiliate of the Economist, consistently ranks Vancouver as one of the most livable cities in the world; in 2018, the top city in the Americas and fifth globally. The EIU's rankings of 140 cities are based on stability, health care, culture, environment, education and infrastructure.

While B.C. is known globally for maintaining a high standard of living and being among the best places to live and work, the cost of living, and specifically housing affordability in Vancouver is exceptionally challenging. Even though Vancouver is often ranked as the most expensive city in Canada to live due to the high cost of housing, it is still relatively modest when compared on a global scale to other major urban centres in respect to overall cost of living factors.

== Sectors ==
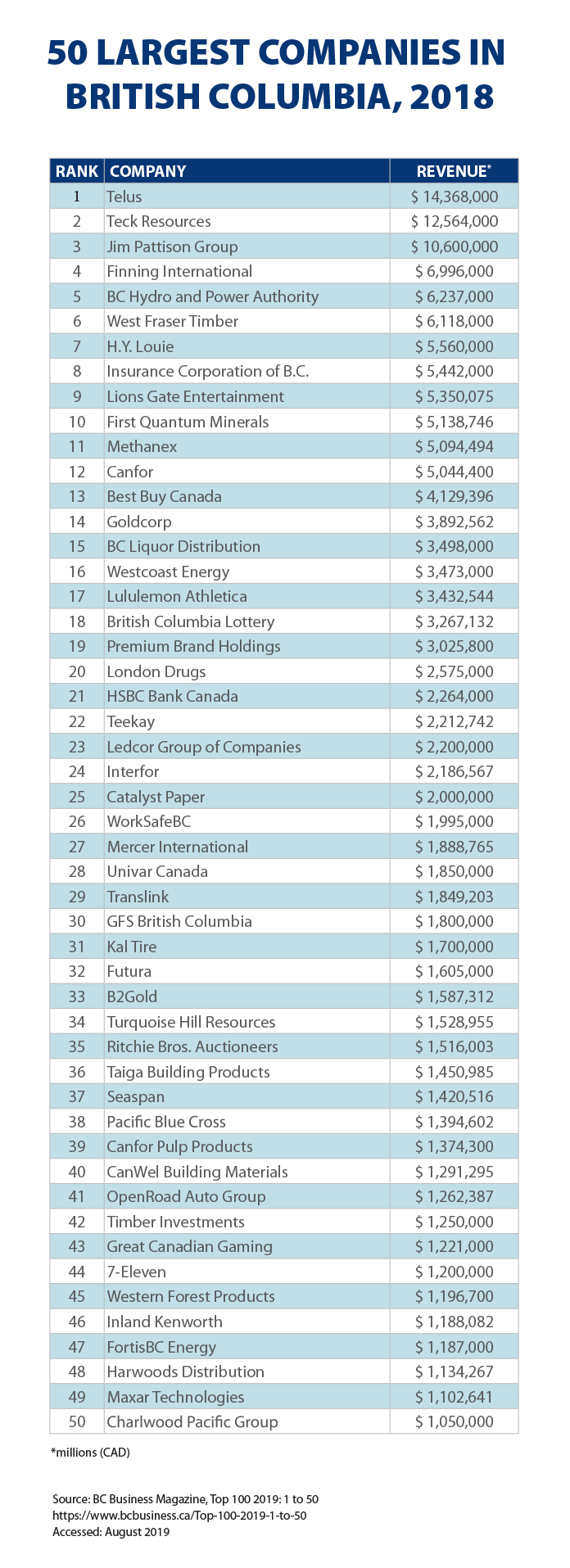
B.C. Largest Companies, 2018

B.C.’s economy is diversified, which is reflected by a broad range of sectors that encompass its economy and largest corporations.

There were a total of 501,300 businesses in B.C. in 2017; of these, 98% were small businesses with fewer than 50 employees. Further, 83% of businesses in B.C. employed fewer than five employees, and 60% were self-employed individuals with no paid help.

In 2016, close to 6,900 B.C. businesses exported goods to destinations outside of Canada. Of these, over 5,900 (or 86%) were small businesses that shipped approximately $18 billion worth of goods to international destinations, making up 43% of the total value of goods exported from the province, with an average export value per business of just over $3 million.

The total value of B.C.'s merchandise exports reached $64.4 billion in 2022, up more than $10 billion from the previous year.

=== Aerospace ===
British Columbia's aerospace industry holds a significant place in Canada, encompassing approximately 200 companies that collectively generate $2.5 billion in annual revenue.

The B.C. aerospace sector is diverse and globally competitive, offering a wide range of specialized products and services. Key areas include:

- Training and Education: Providing opportunities for pilots, air traffic controllers, and aircraft maintenance personnel
- Maintenance and Repair: Offering comprehensive services for both fixed-wing and rotary-wing aircraft, serving military and commercial customers.
- Manufacturing and Design: Home to leading-edge companies producing essential components for the global aerospace industry
- Advanced Technologies: Specializing in aerospace communications, systems integration, and user interface design
- Space and Remote Sensing: Contributing to cutting-edge developments in space technology and earth observation.

This ecosystem positions B.C. in both North American and global aerospace supply chains, with companies spread across the province and concentrated primarily in Greater Vancouver, the Fraser Valley, the Okanagan Valley, and Vancouver Island

=== Agriculture and seafood ===
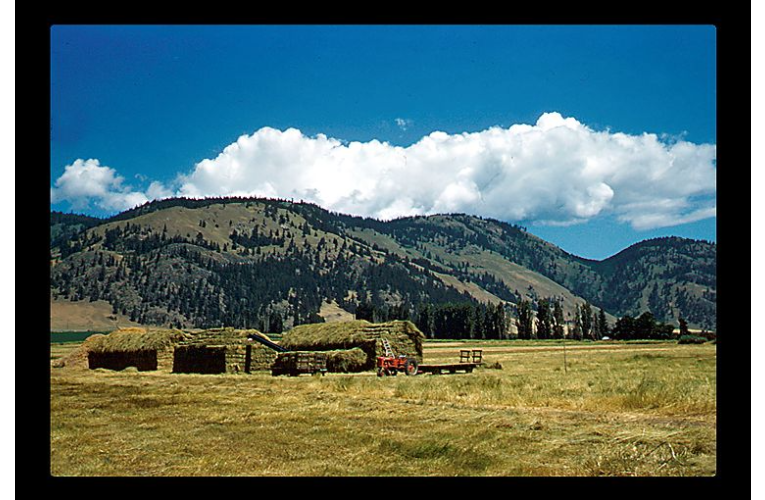
Coldstream Ranch in 1954

B.C. has one of the most diverse agriculture, seafood and food processing industries in Canada, exporting hundreds of agrifood and seafood products.

There are approximately 2,800 food and beverage processing companies in B.C. employing over 32,000 people in 2017, generating $9.8 billion in revenues and $3.9 billion in exports.

Major crops are grapes (including those bound for the country's wine industry), strawberries and blueberries.

The British Columbia Blueberry Council represents growers in the province.

The British Columbia Strawberry Growers Association (formerly the Fraser Valley Strawberry Growers Association) represents strawberry growers, a small number of about 48 in the Fraser Valley. BCSGA's offices are in Abbotsford.

=== Clean technology ===
B.C. is home to more than 270 clean technology companies. Notable clean technology companies in B.C. include Ballard Power Systems, Methanex, General Fusion, Corvus Energy, and Carbon Engineering.

=== Forestry ===
British Columbia is one of the world’s largest exporters of wood products.

Almost 60% of British Columbia's land base is productive forest land, providing rich, diverse and abundant wood fibre. The B.C. forest industry is characterized by:

- Vast timber supplies – British Columbia has 55 million hectares of productive forests that provide diverse and abundant wood fiber. These forests contain roughly 11 billion cubic metres of timber. However, in recent years, a pine beetle outbreak and large forest fires have resulted in low timber supply and caused numerous challenges for the industry.
- Varied tree species – Tree species in B.C. forests are primarily coniferous or softwood, including Douglas fir, western hemlock, Pacific silver fir, western red cedar, lodgepole pine and interior spruce.
- A land tenure system – Most of B.C. land is publicly owned. The provincial government issues land tenures, giving companies the right to harvest in exchange for fees and management responsibilities.
- Varied wood products – Commodity products, including standard dimensional lumber, pulp, paper, and panel boards, and wood pellets.
- A growing value-added sector – Small and medium-sized firms produce a wide range of value-added products, such as treated lumber, engineered wood products, shakes and shingles, mass timber, posts, poles, log and timber-frame homes, mouldings, and other finished or semi-finished products.

=== Information and communications technology (ICT) ===
Due north of Silicon Valley and Seattle, British Columbia (B.C.) has become a hotspot for the technology sector, with more than 11,000 tech companies, including Microsoft, Hootsuite, Intel, Samsung, Slack and Salesforce.

Technology clusters in Vancouver, Victoria and Kelowna attract major global companies and start-ups alike, pursuing advances in software, cloud and quantum computing, information technology, artificial intelligence, Internet of Things (IoT), telecommunications and electronics manufacturing.

The University of British Columbia (UBC)—ranked second in Canada in both computer science and engineering—holds dozens of Canada Research Chairs and has produced approximately 200 spin-off companies.

B.C. is also home to Canada's Digital Technology Supercluster, a collaborative effort of over 200 organizations, including some of Canada's biggest names in health care, telecommunications, natural resources, computing and transportation.

=== Digital media and entertainment ===
B.C. is an important player in the global creative economy with many companies in digital media, film, television, visual effects, animation and post-production. The province is one of the world’s top video game and AR/VR centres and has been called Hollywood North due to the scale of its full-service film and TV production capacity. Over 160 video game development studios including EA (Electronic Arts) and Relic Entertainment (Sega) reside in the province. Virtual Reality firms in B.C., including Microsoft, Cloudhead Games and Archiact, are developing practical tools to enhance education, health care, and other sectors.

=== Life sciences ===
British Columbia has one of the fastest growing life sciences sectors in Canada, and is home to approximately 1,300 companies. The number of life sciences businesses based in the province grew by 26.5% between 2018 and 2021.

Key areas where British Columbia is producing products and services include HIV-AIDS, oncology and genomics. Leading companies include STEMCELL Technologies, Zymeworks, AbCellera Biologics, Starfish Medical, Kardium, Amgen and Xenon Pharmaceuticals with specialization in drugs and pharmaceuticals, medical devices and research, testing and medical laboratories.

=== Mining and critical minerals ===
British Columbia has over 150 years of mining history. B.C.’s abundant mountains and river valleys contain a variety of minerals in global demand including copper, gold, molybdenum, silver, aggregates, industrial minerals and other mining products. B.C. is Canada's only producer of molybdenum ores and concentrates ($110 million in exports).

As global demand for the minerals and metals needed for transitioning to a low-carbon future increases, British Columbia is at the forefront, with more than 1,100 global exploration and mining companies headquartered in Vancouver. B.C. mining companies have adopted high tech and clean tech solutions to support innovative and responsible mineral exploration. The mining industry continues to grow in environmentally sustainable and socially responsible ways to meet global demand. In 2017:

- British Columbia's mineral and coal exports were worth nearly $9 billion (CAD).
- B.C. exported $2.6 billion worth of copper ores and concentrates as Canada's largest copper producer.
- B.C. is Canada's only producer of molybdenum ores and concentrates ($110 million in exports).

=== Natural gas ===
British Columbia's natural gas resources are estimated at over 2,900 trillion cubic feet of gas-in-place, far exceeding domestic use needs by several hundred years. Natural gas extraction has taken place in B.C. since the early 1950s. The northeast region of the province is where most natural gas resources can be found – in areas such as the Horn River Basin, the Montney Basin, the Liard Basin and the Cordova Embayment. There are also more than 50,000 kilometres of existing pipelines in British Columbia – gathering pipelines, transmission pipelines and the pipelines that deliver natural gas to customers.

Liquefied Natural Gas (LNG) – a shippable form of natural gas – saw usage double globally between 2000 and 2010. The LNG Canada joint venture under development, involving Shell, Petronas, PetroChina, Mitsubishi and KOGAS, based in Kitimat, is the first terminal in B.C. to come onstream with a large-scale LNG export capacity by the middle of 2025. Smaller scale LNG exports are planned for Fortis BC's Tilbury Island facility in Delta and by Woodfibre LNG in Squamish, owned by Pacific Oil & Gas.

=== Marine and ocean technology ===
As a Pacific gateway with more than 25,000 kilometers of coastline, British Columbia (B.C.) has a long history in the marine sector with 130 years of shipbuilding, refit, repair, maintenance and supply-chain activities.

B.C. is at the forefront of marine technology, from establishing one of the world’s first and largest undersea digital observatories to developing deep water submersibles and remotely operated vehicles. More than 1,000 marine companies are headquartered in B.C. in areas such as:

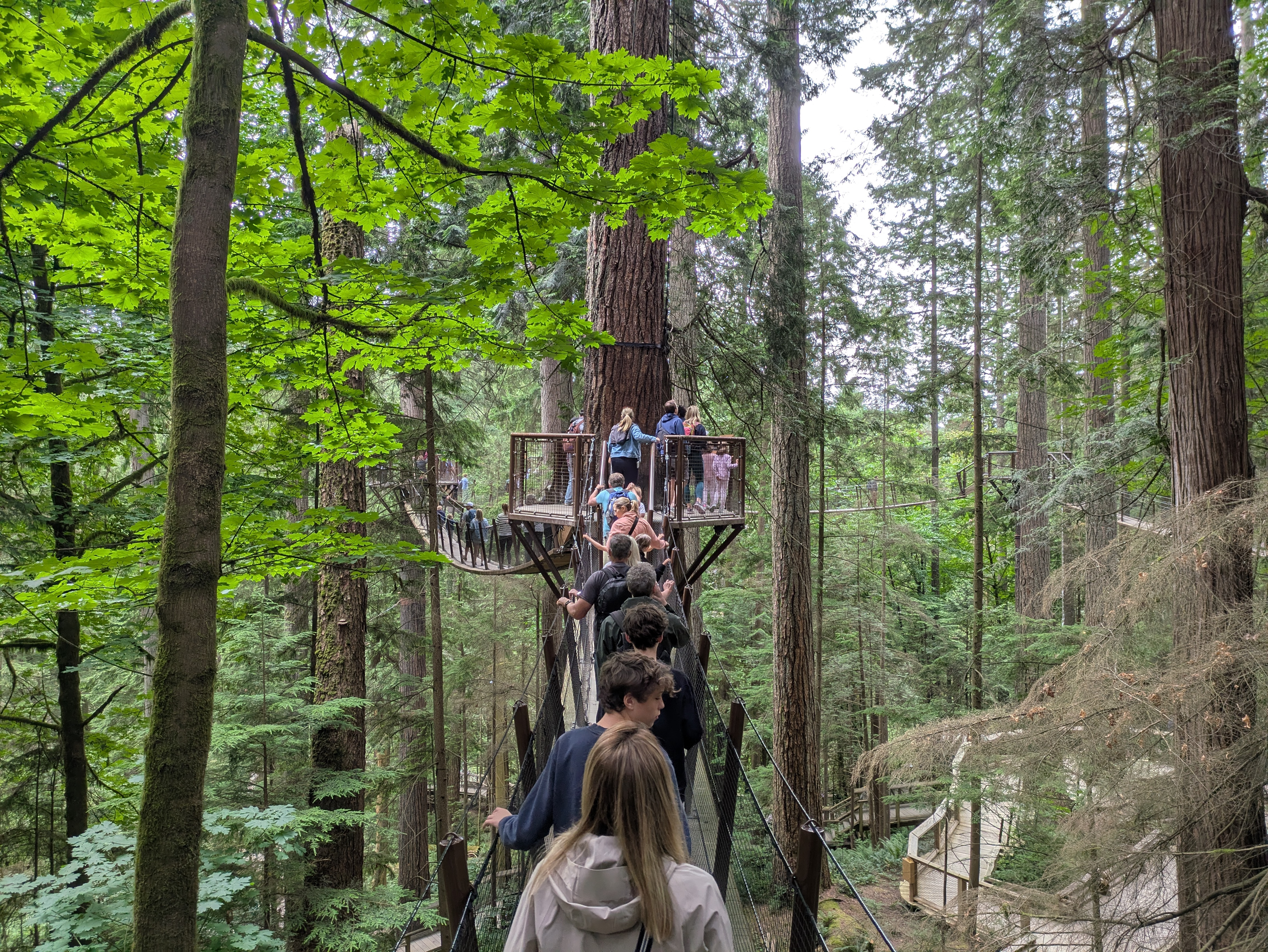
Tourists at Capilano Suspension Bridge Park, near Vancouver

- Ship design, building and repair
- Acoustics systems and equipment
- Marine security
- Imaging technology
- Instrumentation and information systems
- Communications
- Platforms and vehicles
- Ocean energy

=== Tourism ===
Tourism is one of British Columbia's leading economic sectors and is significant in every region of the province. Tourism generated $18 billion (CAD) in revenues in 2017, contributing 10% to GDP. In 2015, tourism employed 127,700 British Columbians. There were nearly 19,000 tourism-related business establishments operating in the province during 2015, including over 400 Indigenous businesses offering authentic cultural experiences.

Accommodation and food services generated over one-third (35.5%) of total tourism revenue in 2015. Transportation services accounted for nearly a third (32.0%) and retail services accounted for more than a quarter (26.3%) of total tourism revenue.
