= Fairwinds, British Columbia =

Settlement in British Columbia, Canada

Fairwinds is a resort style community located in Nanoose Bay, British Columbia, Canada.

The community features a variety of services including a year-round 18-hole golf course, a full-service 250 berth marina, a 20,000sf wellness club, two restaurants and a collection of vacation rental suites.

The 1300-acre property that would become Fairwinds was purchased in 1981 by Neil Scott, Al Slaughter, Bill Benner and Frank Herman with the dream of creating a waterfront community based around a championship golf course and the Schooner Cover Marina. Seacliff Properties acquired the community in 2015 and has been devoted to evolving the community as an exceptional place to live, work and play since its acquisition, setting a standard for master-planned residential communities on Vancouver Island and beyond.

As of 2016, according to the Canadian Census, Fairwinds had a population of 1,147.

== Outdoor Recreation ==
Fairwinds features a network of over 12 km of hiking trails including Notch Hill, Enos Lake and Brickyard Bay.

== Fairwinds Golf Club ==
Opened in 1984, Fairwinds Golf Club is a semi-private course that features two expansive practice greens, a year-round driving range with covered and heated stalls and a dedicated short-game practice area. Architect Les Furber designed it to be challenging, and demanding of strategic play, with contoured greens and tree-lined fairways. The course overlooks a rainforest and the Pacific Ocean.

== Fairwinds Marina ==
Fairwinds Marina completed a full renovation in 2025 featuring a brand-new concrete dock facility that provides seamless, reliable access for boaters, along with a full-service fuel station.

The 250-berth marina provides moorage on annual, semi-annual, and short-term bases. It accommodates vessels up to 80 feet on an annual basis and up to 100 feet on a seasonal basis.
