= Welcome Beach, British Columbia =

Coordinates: 49.482°N 123.902°W

Welcome Beach is a settlement in British Columbia located North-West of Vancouver on the West coast of Canada.

According to the 2016 Canadian Census, Welcome Beach has a population of 1125.
