= Langley, British Columbia (city) =

City in British Columbia, Canada

Langley
- City
- City of Langley
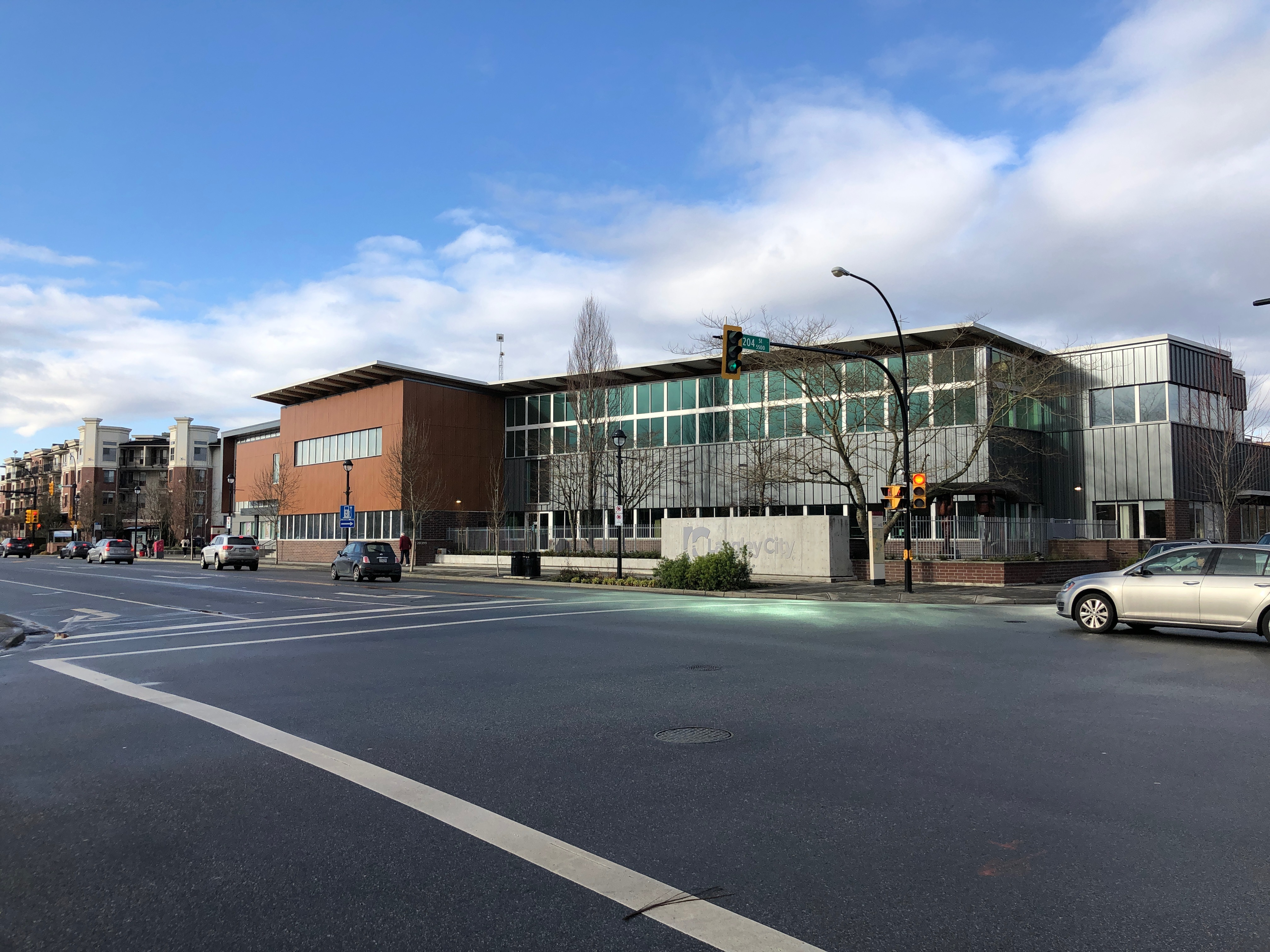
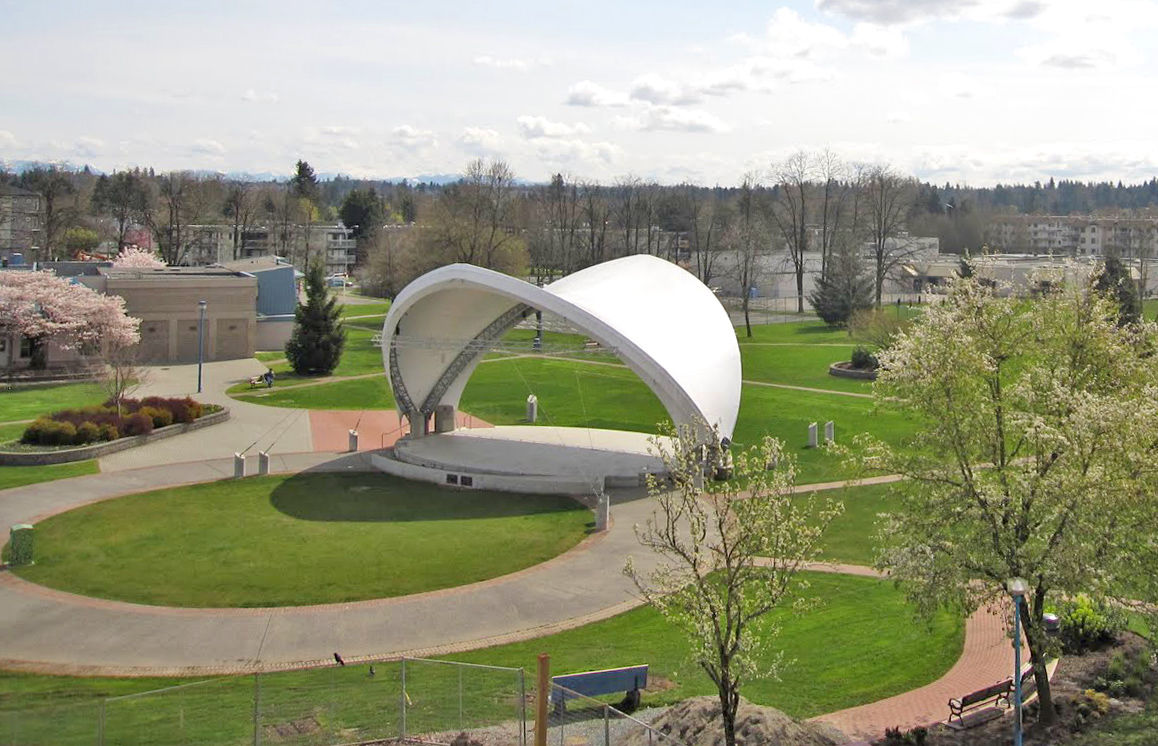
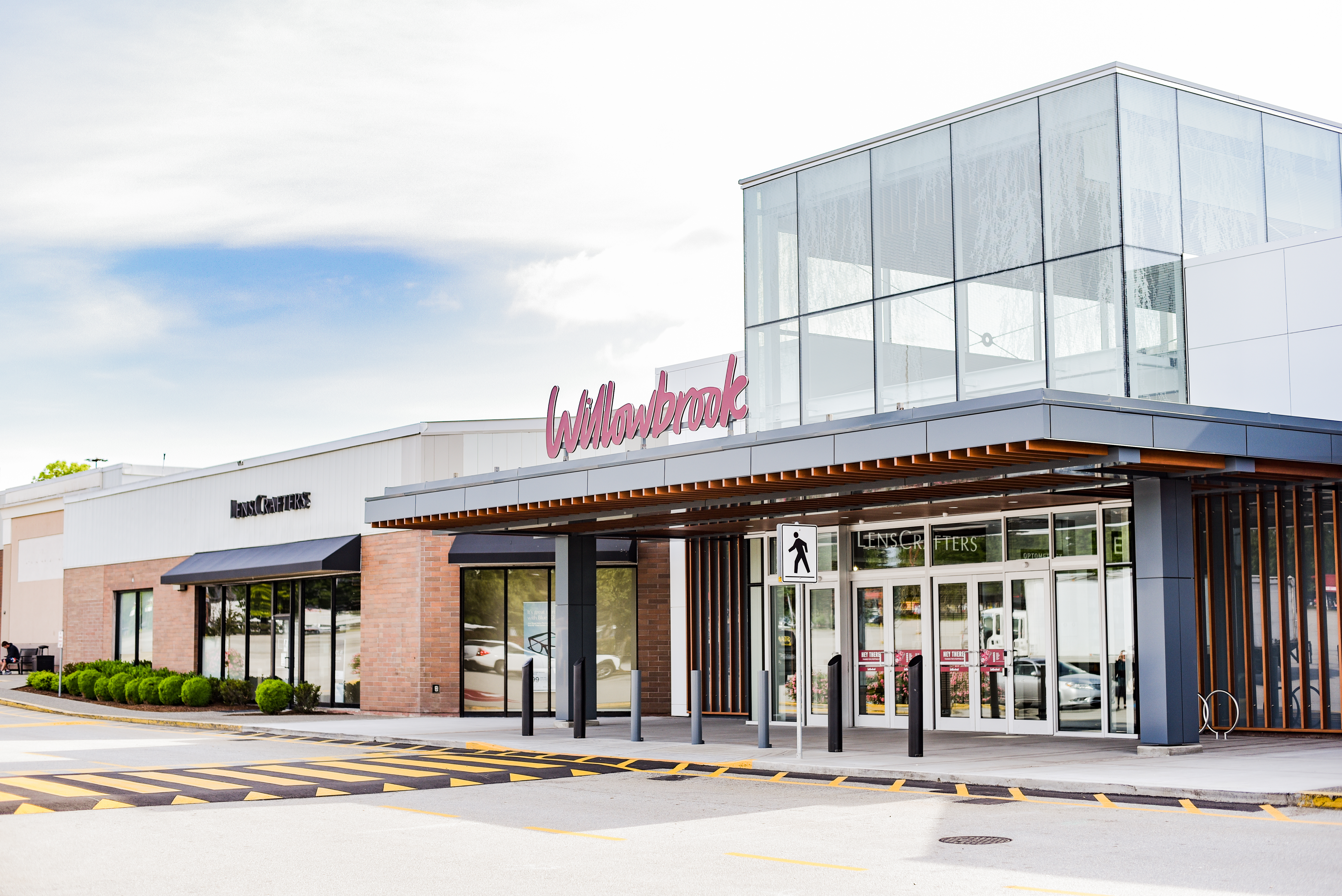
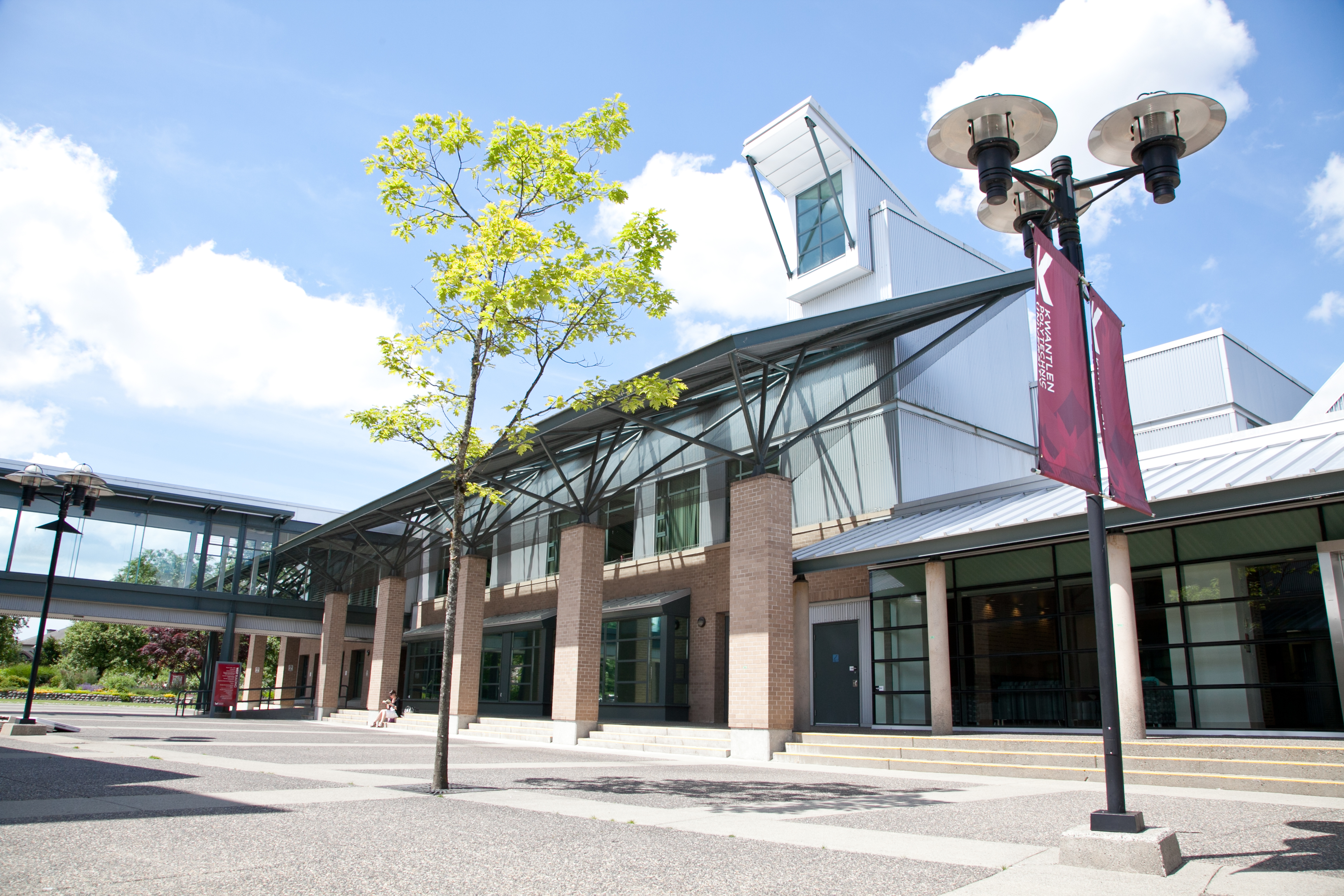
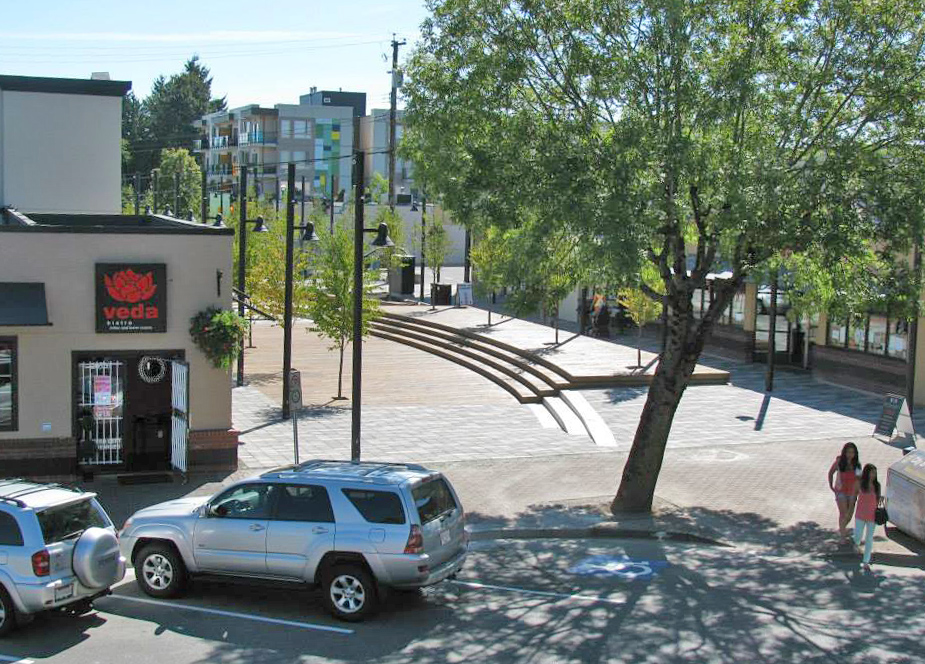
- Langley City Hall Douglas Park Willowbrook Shopping Centre Kwantlen Polytechnic University McBurney Plaza

- Flag Coat of arms
- Nickname: Langley City
- Motto(s): "Strength of Purpose, Spirit of Community"
- Location of Langley City in Metro Vancouver
- Coordinates: 49°06′14″N 122°39′24″W
- Country: Canada
- Province: British Columbia
- Regional district: Metro Vancouver
- Incorporated: March 15, 1955
- Seat: Langley City Hall

Government
  - Type: Mayor-council government
  - Body: Langley City Council
  - Mayor: Delaney Mack
  - MP: Tamara Jansen (CPC)
  - MLA: Jody Toor (BCC)

Area
  - Land: 10.18 km^{2} (3.93 sq mi)
- Elevation: 15 m (49 ft)

Population (2021)
  - Total: 28,963
  - Estimate (2023): 31,936
  - Density: 2,845.2/km^{2} (7,369/sq mi)
- Time zone: UTC−07:00 (BC Pacific Time)
- Forward sortation area: V3A, V2Y
- Area codes: 604, 778, 236, 672
- Website: city.langley.bc.ca

Langley is a city in the Metro Vancouver Regional District in British Columbia, Canada. It lies directly east of Surrey, adjacent to the Cloverdale area, and is surrounded elsewhere by the Township of Langley, bordered by its neighbourhoods of Willowbrook to the north, Murrayville to the east, and Brookswood and Fern Ridge to the south.

== History ==
Early European settlement in the area was known as "Innes Corners" (after homesteader Adam Innes); in 1911, the area became known as "Langley Prairie", part of the Township of Langley a.k.a. Langley Township since 1873. Twentieth-century improvements in transportation access, including the construction of the British Columbia Electric Railway in 1910, Fraser Highway in the 1920s, and Pattullo Bridge in 1937, profoundly impacted the area, transforming it from rural into the main urban and commercial core of the Township. In turn, this birthed the need for upgraded and new amenities, especially with respect to health, infrastructure, safety and sanitation.

The municipal government, however, refused to finance these projects as it bowed, instead, to politically influential farming communities and smaller, mostly rural, business centres, like Fort Langley, Milner and Murrayville, that viewed such spending as unnecessary. Talk of secession began in Langley Prairie in the 1930s, as a result. Headed by a panel of important residents and businesspersons, including Richard Langdon, president of the Langley Board of Trade, the push for independence came to a head in the 1950s.

Specifically, two issues decided Langley's future. First was street lights, which Langley Prairie argued were needed not only for safety but also progress, yet on which reeve George Brooks declared "not a nickel" would be spent. Second was Langley Prairie's belief that it had neither the political sway nor fair share of municipal services that it deserved relative to its local tax contribution. Langley Prairie by then constituted 20% of the Township's tax base. A referendum on secession was therefore held in September, 1954. It passed with over 85% of the vote. Langley Prairie officially seceded and became the City of Langley on March 15, 1955.

== City plan ==
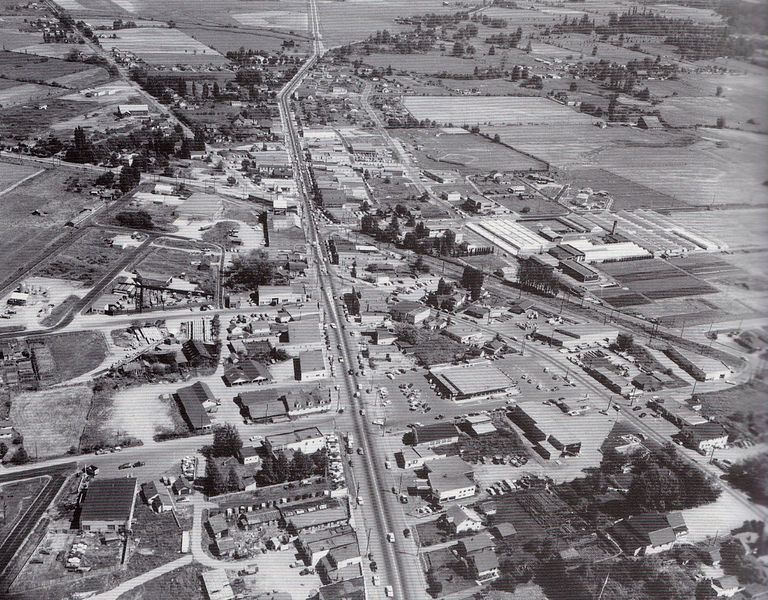
Aerial View of Langley City in 1959

=== Road network ===
Langley City follows the same block system as its neighbouring Township of Langley as well as other Districts in the Fraser Valley, where Streets run north-south, and Avenues run east-west.

=== Development barriers ===
Many natural and artificial barriers prevent Langley City from following a complete tidy grid:

- The land governed by the City is not a rectangle but an uneven shape with "cut-out" corners.
- Fraser Highway intersects the City at an approximate 45-degree angle North West to South East, mirrored by Glover Road which enters the city North East to South West.
- The Nicomekl River flows through the middle of the city East to West.
- Railroad tracks run across the north of the City.

This has affected development in a number of ways, for example, the Langley Bypass turns 45 degrees in the north-west, tracing the boundary outline since it was constructed by the City and could not go over the boundary into the Langley Township. Many streets come to an abrupt halt when reaching the river and continue on the other side without a connecting bridge. Roads such as Douglas Crescent, Logan Avenue, and Eastleigh Crescent parallel the 45-degree angles of Fraser Highway and Glover Road, almost proposing an alternative grid at an angle which conflicts with the grid in place. Even Grade Crescent, which is much further south than these roads, follows this same angle, demonstrating the impact Fraser Highway had on the development of Langley.

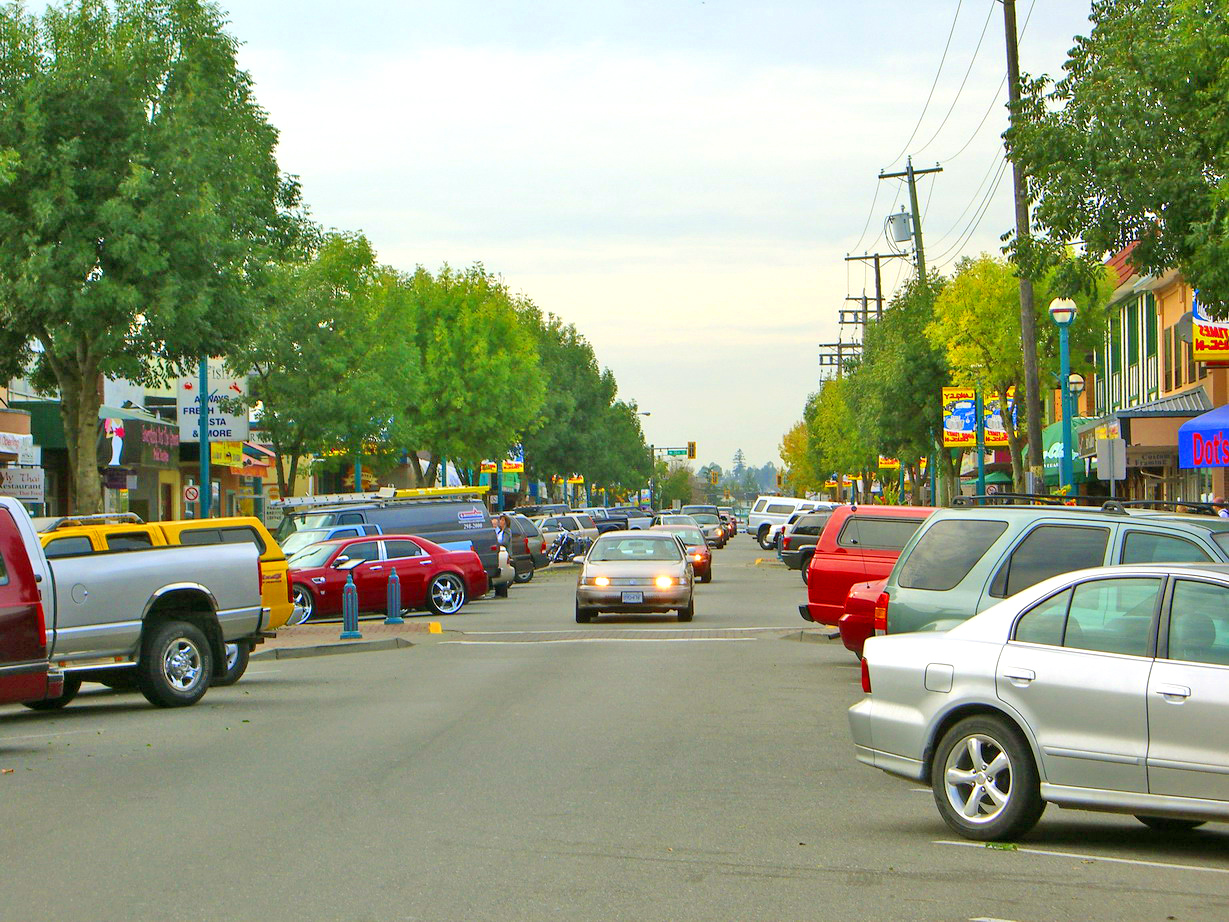
One-way section of Fraser Highway

=== Downtown ===
Langley City's Downtown was developed around Old Yale Road, which later on became Fraser Highway. Until 1964, Fraser Highway was part of the Trans-Canada Highway network - this major route attracted many businesses to the area.

Today, with the Trans-Canada Highway now in the north of the Langley Township, the downtown is more pedestrian oriented. Where Fraser Highway goes through the downtown it is reduced to a single lane of traffic in one direction to limit traffic flow. This stretch is often affectionately referred to by residents as "The One-Way" and is lined with restaurants and shops on either side, making it a retail centre in the city. Douglas Park is also near this area in the downtown and is seen as the main park in the city, frequently being used for events and shows.

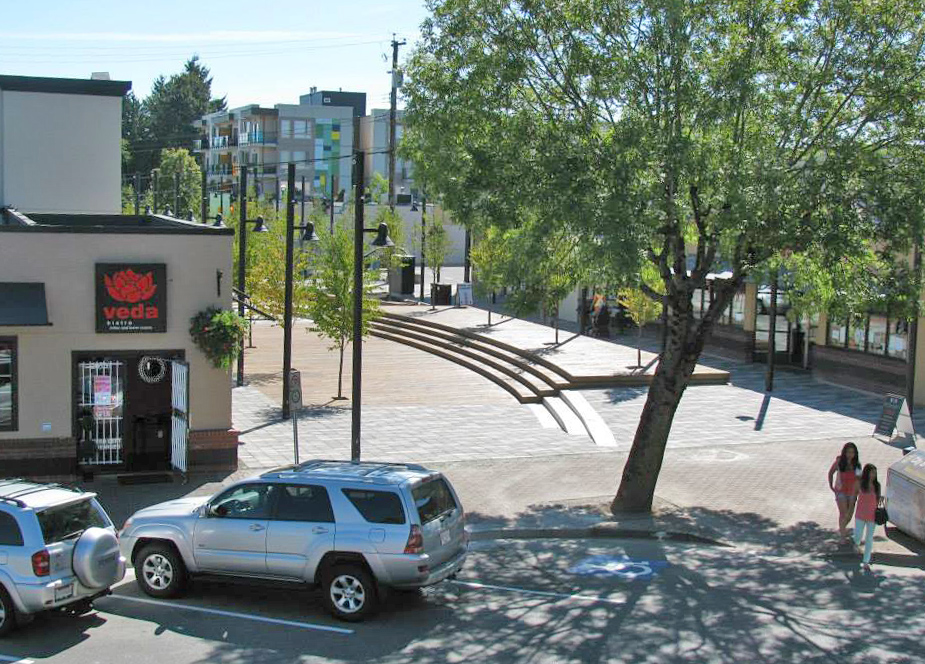
McBurney Plaza in Downtown Langley

In Summer 2013, McBurney Plaza opened to the public replacing McBurney Lane (previously used as a parking lot). This area connects Fraser Highway and Douglas Park with a pedestrian boulevard, providing outdoor space for cafes and space the city can use for street performance and other civic events.

Just outside this downtown centre are strip malls and a number of low rise apartment buildings. Most detached housing remains outside the downtown area.

=== Childcare ===
By 2024, Langley had 1,400 childcare spots, which was less than needed.

In 2024, amid a shortage of childcare facilities in Langley, the City Council limited the opening of new childcare facilities within a section of downtown Langley. Mayor Nathan Pachal who supported the motion said that there was now an opportunity for the city to get creative to find new ways to create childcare spaces in other areas of the city, particularly residential areas.

=== Parks ===
There are over 17 public parks in this city. They range from small neighbourhood adventure playgrounds, to larger parks with nature trails, wildlife, and various sporting fields and equipment.

==== Brydon Park ====
This park contains an adventure playground, a paved play area for ball hockey and basketball, an intermediate soccer field, and a softball diamond. Public washrooms are available. Brydon Lagoon is south of the park and has a peaceful perimeter walk around the lagoon where one may observe wildfowl and turtles.

==== City Park ====
This park features Al Anderson Memorial Pool, a children’s waterpark and playground, a lacrosse box, twelve picnic tables, and public washrooms. A covered picnic shelter that can accommodate up to 75 people is available and can be booked for a picnic.

==== Uplands Dog Off-Leash Park ====
This is an 18-acre, fully fenced area with a perimeter walking path. Dogs and their owners can meet and enjoy a large open space for walking and playing. There is also a drinking fountain designed for both dogs and people.

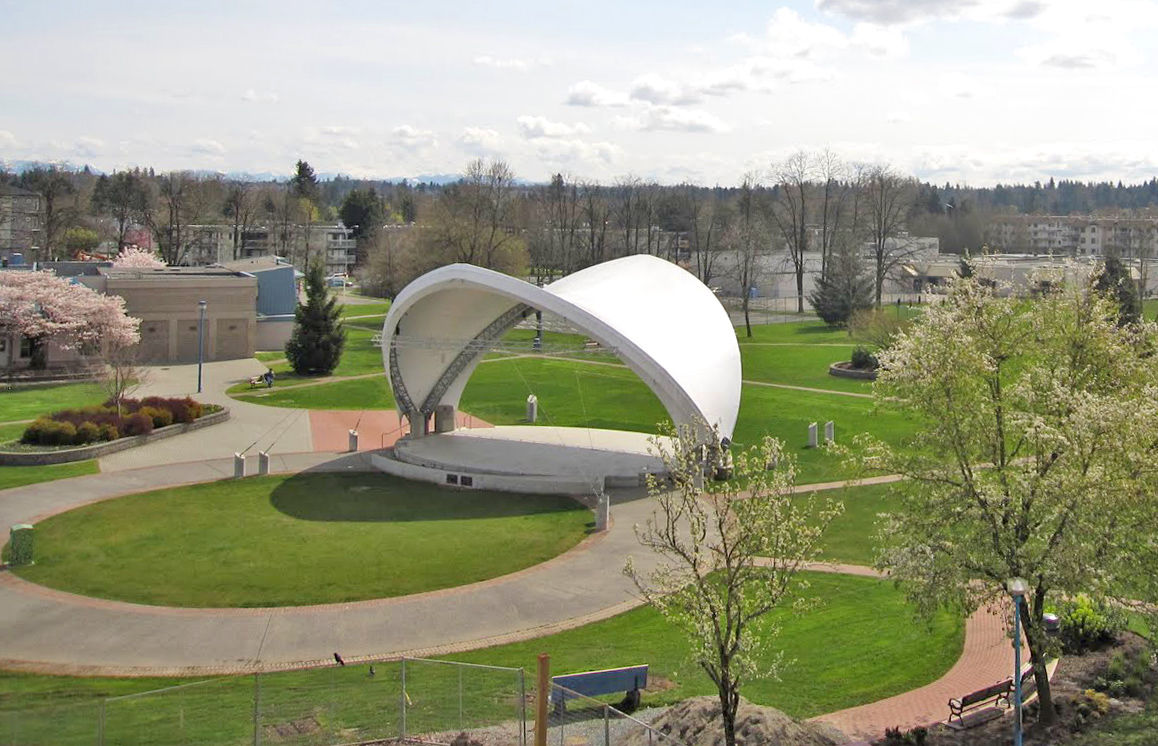
Douglas Park in Downtown Langley

==== Douglas Park ====
Douglas Park is located at the intersection of Douglas Crescent and 206th Street in Langley, British Columbia, Canada.

The park contains an adventure playground, two tennis courts, a water park (seasonal), bowling green, sports box, basketball hoops and public washrooms. It also has an outdoor covered performance platform called "Langley Spirit Square". Langley Spirit Square is the site of an annual Shakespeare performance, "Bard in the Valley."

Douglas Recreation Centre, situated in the park, offers many programs for the citizens of Langley and is also available for rentals such as wedding receptions or banquets and other events.

In 2000, there were plans to build a library in the park, but public opposition forced the library be built elsewhere. In 1971, Langley's city council had plans to install a Chinese garden in the park, but this was never carried out. In 1982, a day care centre in the park was replaced by a bowls meeting house and a bowling green was established adjacent to it.

Douglas Park is the main park in the City of Langley for events, festivals and other civic activities. Featuring a permanent stage, the park is equipped for live performance of music, theatre and other arts.

==== Linwood Park ====
This park contains a fenced dog park and a wheelchair accessible playground. Public washrooms are available.

==== Nicomekl Park ====
This park has a suitable parking area and is the starting point to enter the floodplain and various walking trails.

==== Penzer Action Park ====
This park is home to North America's largest Parkour Course, with an in-ground trampoline, numerous climbing walls, balance beams, and swinging bars will provide hours of creative physical fun. In addition, there is a kid size parkour course, a basketball court with optional volleyball net, dirt jumps for mountain bike enthusiasts, and a pump track. A nature trail passes through the park.

==== Rotary Centennial Park ====
This park contains a playground, ball diamond, senior soccer field, display garden beds, and public washrooms. A paved walking path follows the perimeter, and the facilities are wheelchair accessible.

==== Sendall Gardens ====
This park contains botanical gardens that feature 3.67 acres of plants, shrubs and trees. A nature trail passes through this park, and there are two duck ponds. There are several varieties of wildfowl in the park, including geese and ducks. The tropical greenhouse has a wide variety of exotic plants and is open to the public April 1 to October 1.

== Sports ==
The Langley Rams of the British Columbia Conference of the Canadian Junior Football League are based at the MacLeod Stadium in the Township of Langley.

The Langley Rivermen of the British Columbia Hockey League, the Vancouver Giants of the Western Hockey League and the Vancouver Bandits of the Canadian Elite Basketball League are based at the Langley Events Centre in the Township of Langley.

The Langley Blaze of the British Columbia Premier Baseball League is based at McLeod Park.

A local Little League baseball team represented Canada in the 2011 Little League World Series in Williamsport, PA.

Brett Lawrie, an infielder for the Chicago White Sox is from Langley, as is professional cyclist Svein Tuft of the Greenedge Cycling Team.

The Langley Thunder is a Senior A team in the Western Lacrosse Association, part of the Canadian Lacrosse Association.

== Education ==
School District 35 Langley operates public schools.

The City of Langley is home to six elementary schools and 4 Middle schools, H. D. Stafford Middle School, Yorkson Creek middle school, Langley Christian School, and Peter Ewart Middle School five major high schools are located in the surrounding area; Brookswood Secondary School, Langley Secondary School, D. W. Poppy Secondary School, Walnut Grove Secondary School, and R. E. Mountain Secondary School. They are located in the Township of Langley.

The Conseil scolaire francophone de la Colombie-Britannique operates one Francophone school: école des Voyageurs primary school.

Kwantlen Polytechnic University (KPU) and Trinity Western University (TWU), which is a private Christian liberal arts university, both have campuses in Langley. Both KPU and TWU are members of Universities Canada.

Langley Community Music School was founded in 1969 and is the third largest community music school in the province.

== Transportation ==
Major roads in the City of Langley include 200 Street, 64 Avenue, Fraser Highway, Glover Road, and the Langley Bypass which carries part of British Columbia Highway 10. These roads serve as the backbone of the road infrastructure network by handling traffic from the west in Surrey, Delta, and Ladner, as well as from the east in Aldergrove and Abbotsford.

Trains from across the country pass by the city on a regular basis. A major rail corridor runs alongside the Langley Bypass and towards the Roberts Bank Superport, which handles the export and import of various commodities coming in and out of Asia.

The City of Langley is served by TransLink, which operates the regional transportation network of Metro Vancouver. Langley is served by several regular bus routes, and six "community shuttle" routes operating smaller capacity mini-buses. Currently, Langley doesn't have a rapid transit service, but an extension of the SkyTrain's Expo Line is planned, and it will reach all the way to the city of Langley, which is planned to have one station. They are aiming to finish construction by 2028.

The Fraser Highway is one of the major east-west corridors servicing the City of Langley and the Township of Langley. The "502" bus route operates on a 15-minute headway (12 minutes during rush hour) from the Surrey Central Station in north Surrey to the Langley Centre bus loop in the City of Langley via Fraser Highway. The "503" Express service, launched on June 23, 2014, provides express service between Surrey Central Station and Langley Centre and local service through the Township of Langley into Aldergrove. In September 2019, the 503 was upgraded to provide service every 8 minutes during peak hour. Riders are now given the benefit of being able to board and get off the bus at any 503 stop.

The other major routes include the "320 Surrey Central Station" (via Cloverdale), "341 Guildford" (via Cloverdale, & Newton), the "364 Scottsdale" (via 64th avenue), and the "501 Surrey Central Station" (via 200 St, Carvolth Exchange, Port Kells Industrial and to Surrey Central Station via Guildford Exchange. The "595" to Maple Ridge heads along 208 street, and across the Golden Ears Bridge.

As of December 1, 2012, TransLink had created a new "555 Port Mann Express / Lougheed Town Centre Station" rapid bus service which operates between Carvolth Exchange (in Langley Township) and Lougheed Town Centre Station (in Burnaby) via Highway 1, with just one stop along the way in Surrey. This bus takes approximately 20 minutes from start to finish in one direction. It runs frequently; approximately every 15 minutes during peak times, and every 30 minutes during off-peak times.

== Arts and culture ==
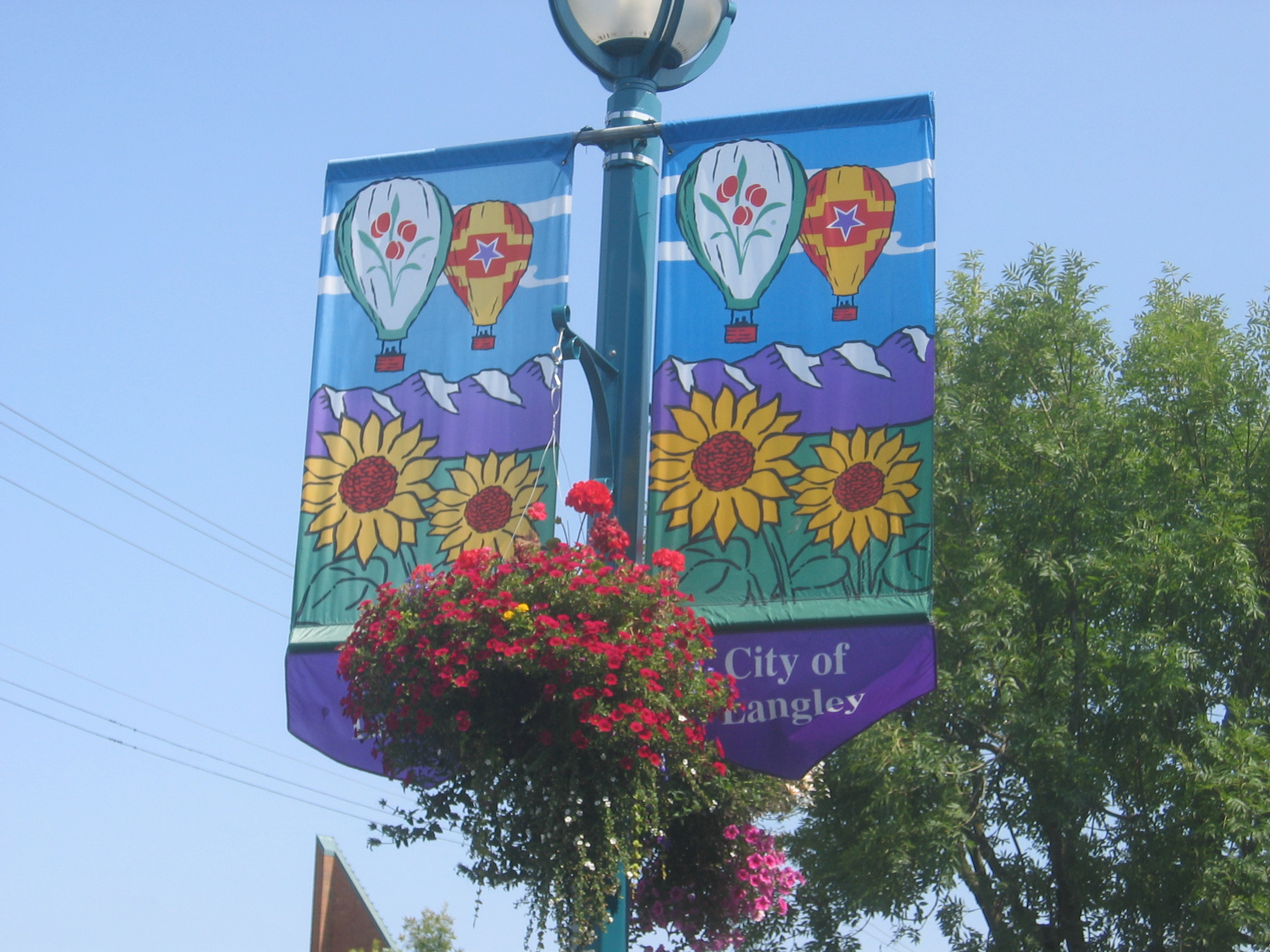
Street banners in Langley's commercial area.

Langley is home to the Arts Alive Festival in August, and the Langley Ukulele Ensemble.

== Government ==
Langley City Council has seats for one mayor and six councillors. Each serves a 4-year term and attends council meetings on a bi-weekly basis. Other governmental departments include the Office of the Chief Administrative Officer, Corporate Services, Development Services & Economic Development, Engineering, Parks & Environment, Recreation, Culture and Community Services, and the Langley City Fire Rescue Service. The City of Langley has a joint RCMP detachment with the township of Langley.

#	Term start	Term end	Mayor
1	1955	1955	Hunter Vogel
2	1955	1959	Ernest Edward Sendell
3	1959	1961	John Alfred Penzer
4	1961	1969	John Herbert Conder
5	1969	1973	David Leonard ("Len") Nicholas
6	1973	1980	William ("Bob") Grant Duckworth, Jr.
7	1980	1982	Aubrey Searle
8	1982	1988	Reginald Henry Easingwood
9	1988	1993	Joe Lopushinsky
10	1993	2005	Marlene Grinell
11	2005	2013	Peter Fassbender
12	2013	2018	Ted Schaffer
13	2018	2022	Val van den Broek
14	2022	2026	Nathan Pachal
15	2026	Incumbent	Delaney Mack

Langley federal election results
Year	Liberal		Conservative		New Democratic		Green	
2021	21%	3,999	39%	4,828	22%	2,760	0%	0
2019	31%	3,962	39%	5,006	19%	2,439	8%	1,069

Langley provincial election results
Year	New Democratic		Liberal		Green	
2020	51%	4,956	30%	2,867	11%	1,083
2017	37%	3,737	40%	4,016	16%	1,655

Langley is also a key component in the Canadian federal electoral district of the same name, which was formed in 2004. The Member of Parliament for the constituency is Liberal John Aldag.

== Climate ==
Climate data for Langley
Month	Jan	Feb	Mar	Apr	May	Jun	Jul	Aug	Sep	Oct	Nov	Dec	Year
Record high °C (°F)	15 (59)	18.5 (65.3)	20 (68)	24.4 (75.9)	34 (93)	40.0 (104.0)	35.6 (96.1)	36.1 (97.0)	33.3 (91.9)	27.5 (81.5)	19 (66)	16.1 (61.0)	40.0 (104.0)
Mean daily maximum °C (°F)	5 (41)	7.6 (45.7)	10.5 (50.9)	13.3 (55.9)	16.8 (62.2)	19.3 (66.7)	22.6 (72.7)	22.8 (73.0)	19.6 (67.3)	14.1 (57.4)	8.1 (46.6)	5.3 (41.5)	13.8 (56.7)
Daily mean °C (°F)	2.2 (36.0)	4.4 (39.9)	6.3 (43.3)	8.6 (47.5)	11.8 (53.2)	14.2 (57.6)	16.7 (62.1)	17.0 (62.6)	14.2 (57.6)	9.8 (49.6)	5.1 (41.2)	2.7 (36.9)	9.4 (49.0)
Mean daily minimum °C (°F)	−0.6 (30.9)	1.2 (34.2)	2.2 (36.0)	3.8 (38.8)	6.7 (44.1)	9.2 (48.6)	10.8 (51.4)	11.1 (52.0)	8.8 (47.8)	5.6 (42.1)	2.1 (35.8)	0.1 (32.2)	5.1 (41.2)
Record low °C (°F)	−14 (7)	−12 (10)	−8.3 (17.1)	−2.8 (27.0)	−0.6 (30.9)	1.7 (35.1)	3.9 (39.0)	3.3 (37.9)	−1.7 (28.9)	−7 (19)	−16 (3)	−19.4 (−2.9)	−19.4 (−2.9)
Average precipitation mm (inches)	176 (6.9)	172.1 (6.78)	135.2 (5.32)	102.7 (4.04)	82.8 (3.26)	72.9 (2.87)	52.7 (2.07)	56.4 (2.22)	76.4 (3.01)	141 (5.6)	207.5 (8.17)	211.3 (8.32)	1,486.9 (58.54)
Average rainfall mm (inches)	153.0 (6.02)	156.4 (6.16)	131.4 (5.17)	102.1 (4.02)	82.8 (3.26)	72.9 (2.87)	52.7 (2.07)	56.4 (2.22)	76.4 (3.01)	140.7 (5.54)	200.8 (7.91)	193.4 (7.61)	1,419 (55.86)
Average snowfall cm (inches)	23.0 (9.1)	15.8 (6.2)	3.8 (1.5)	0.6 (0.2)	0 (0)	0 (0)	0 (0)	0 (0)	0 (0)	0.3 (0.1)	6.7 (2.6)	17.9 (7.0)	68.1 (26.7)
Average precipitation days (≥ 0.2 mm)	17.5	17.7	17.2	15.3	14.1	12.3	7.6	8.3	11.0	15.5	19.5	18.3	174.3
Average rainy days	15.5	16.3	16.9	15.3	14.1	12.3	7.6	8.3	11.0	15.5	18.8	16.5	168.1
Average snowy days (≥ 0.2 cm)	3.3	2.2	1.1	0.1	0	0	0	0	0	0.1	1.2	3.1	11.1
Source: Environment Canada

== Demographics ==
In the 2021 Census of Population conducted by Statistics Canada, Langley had a population of 28,963 living in 12,598 of its 13,271 total private dwellings, a change of 11.9% from its 2016 population of 25,888. With a land area of 10.18 km^{2} (3.93 sq mi), it had a population density of 2,845.1/km^{2} (7,368.7/sq mi) in 2021.

=== Ethnicity ===
Panethnic groups in the City of Langley (2001−2021)
Panethnic group	2021		2016		2011		2006		2001	
Panethnic group	Pop.	%	Pop.	%	Pop.	%	Pop.	%	Pop.	%
European (Note: Statistic includes all persons that did not make up part of a visible minority or an indigenous identity.)	19,505	69.6%	20,295	80.17%	20,490	83.68%	19,920	85.37%	20,610	88.06%
South Asian	1,960	6.99%	580	2.29%	355	1.45%	250	1.07%	145	0.62%
Southeast Asian (Note: Statistic includes total responses of "Filipino" and "Southeast Asian" under visible minority section on census.)	1,755	6.26%	1,155	4.56%	1,030	4.21%	565	2.42%	360	1.54%
Indigenous	1,595	5.69%	1,520	6%	1,260	5.15%	850	3.64%	745	3.18%
East Asian (Note: Statistic includes total responses of "Chinese", "Korean", and "Japanese" under visible minority section on census.)	1,150	4.1%	830	3.28%	785	3.21%	1,115	4.78%	855	3.65%
African	605	2.16%	205	0.81%	105	0.43%	260	1.11%	140	0.6%
Middle Eastern (Note: Statistic includes total responses of "West Asian" and "Arab" under visible minority section on census.)	585	2.09%	230	0.91%	35	0.14%	40	0.17%	95	0.41%
Latin American	510	1.82%	270	1.07%	215	0.88%	255	1.09%	310	1.32%
Other/multiracial (Note: Statistic includes total responses of "Visible minority, n.i.e." and "Multiple visible minorities" under visible minority section on census.)	355	1.27%	225	0.89%	210	0.86%	75	0.32%	145	0.62%
Total responses	28,025	96.76%	25,315	97.79%	24,485	97.62%	23,335	98.85%	23,405	98.99%
Total population	28,963	100%	25,888	100%	25,081	100%	23,606	100%	23,643	100%
Note: Totals greater than 100% due to multiple origin responses.

=== Religion ===
According to the 2021 census, religious groups in Langley included:

- Irreligion (13,790 persons or 49.2%)
- Christianity (11,430 persons or 40.8%)
- Sikhism (1,045 persons or 3.7%)
- Islam (800 persons or 2.9%)
- Buddhism (360 persons or 1.3%)
- Hinduism (350 persons or 1.2%)
- Judaism (35 persons or 0.1%)
- Other (220 persons or 0.8%)

== Infrastructure ==
Langley's community facilities include:

- Timms Community Centre
- Al Anderson Memorial – 25-metre public swimming pool
- Douglas Recreation Centre
- Langley Fire Rescue Hall
- Langley City FVRL Library
- Cascades Casino, Coast Hotel & Convention Centre
- Numerous parks

== Neighbourhoods ==
The City of Langley's Community Profile identifies six neighbourhoods based on elementary school catchment area: Nicomekl, Douglas, Simonds, Blacklock, Alice Brown and Uplands.

== Notable people ==
- Wes Barker, magician
- Dennis Cholowski, NHL defenseman for the Detroit Red Wings
- Amanda Crew, actress
- Georgia Ellenwood, 2018 NCAA Heptathlon champion
- Jose Figueroa took refuge in Langley
- Danton Heinen, NHL player for the Pittsburgh Penguins
- Carle Hessay, painter
- Brett Lawrie, baseball player
- Chelsea McMullan, documentary filmmaker
- Brock Phillips, singer and songwriter
- J. Jill Robinson, author of fiction and creative nonfiction
- Brian Smith, the guitarist for the rock band Trooper.
- Dallas Smith, the lead vocalist for the rock band Default and country music singer.
- Tom Thacker, guitarist and vocalist with Gob and Sum 41
- Shea Theodore, NHL defenseman for the Vegas Golden Knights
- Jacob Tremblay, actor known for leading roles in Room, Before I Wake, and Good Boys
- Leonard Woods, sculptor
