= Brookswood Secondary School =

School in Langley, British Columbia

Location
- 20902 37A Avenue; Langley, British Columbia, V3A 5N2; Canada; 49.069657°N 122.644207°W

Information
- School type: Public Secondary School
- Motto: A world of unlimited possibilities
- Founded: 1973
- School board: School District 35 Langley
- Grades: 8-12
- Enrollment: 952 (2020)
- Language: English and French immersion
- Area: Brookswood, British Columbia
- Colour
- Mascot: Bobcat
- Team name: Brookswood Bobcats
- Website: brookswoodsecondary.com

Brookswood Secondary School is located in the community of Brookswood in Langley, British Columbia. Among other resources, the school has an automechanics workshop, two gymnasiums, a theatre, a dark room, and a television studio. The school also offers a French Immersion program as well as Spanish.

== History ==
On March 22, 1973, in response to overcrowding at H.D. Stafford Junior Secondary, a $1.5 million contract began the construction of a Brookswood Junior Secondary School (Grades 8–10); its students would move to Langley Secondary to graduate. The school was later enlarged to become a full (8–12) secondary school, and further renovations (including a second gym) were completed between 1995 and 1996.

Brookswood was one of a trio of Langley schools built from the same, or similar plans - designed to accommodate expansion. The others were R.E. Mountain Secondary and D.W. Poppy Secondary. After extensive renovations at all three schools, they are hardly recognizable as having evolved from the same plan. Brookswood (currently the largest of the three) and Poppy have both completed their courtyard enclosure, while Mountain remains closest to its original form.

== Drama ==
Brookswood theatre department holds an annual drama festival "Showcase" with plays written by grade 12 students. These students are members of the Directing and Scriptwriting 12 class, of which the purpose is to write, cast, and direct a play during the school year. As well, Brookswood is host to acting and stage management classes for grades 9–12, and the classes frequently collaborate to put on productions for the school as well as the district and provincial drama festivals. Productions put on by the school include Mama Mia! and SpongeBob Squarepants.

== Video production ==
Brookswood is home to Backstreet Studios, where teens in grades 9-12 are welcome to enroll in various video production programs. Many videos to come out of Backstreet have fared well in provincial student film festivals, with Brookswood being one of the top contenders in many categories year after year. Additionally, several film students have earned scholarships to VFS through their good performances at the student festivals.

== Sports ==
Brookswood organizes a number of sports teams, including basketball, soccer, volleyball, swimming, curling, rugby, and hockey.

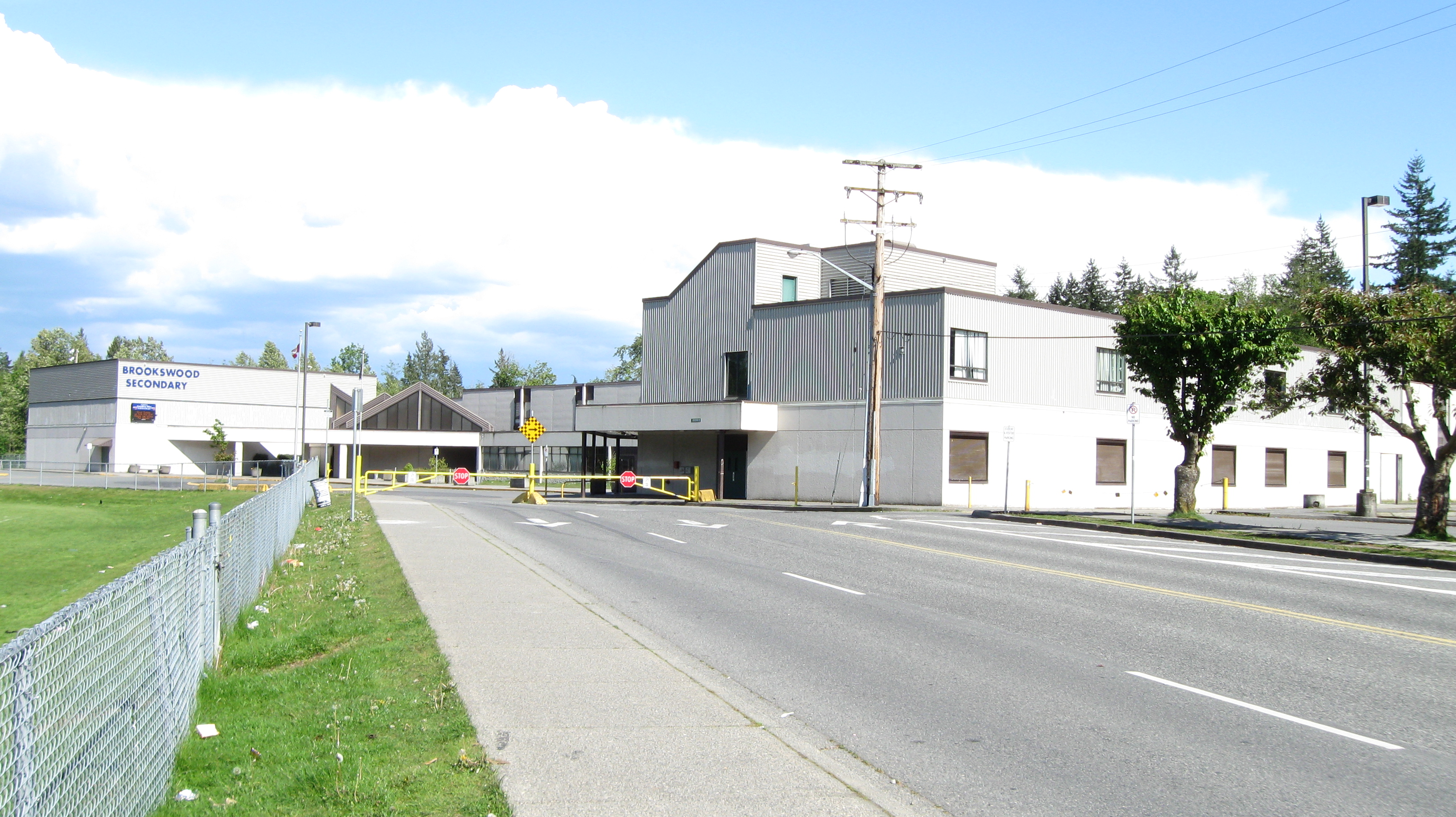
Brookswood Secondary in 2010

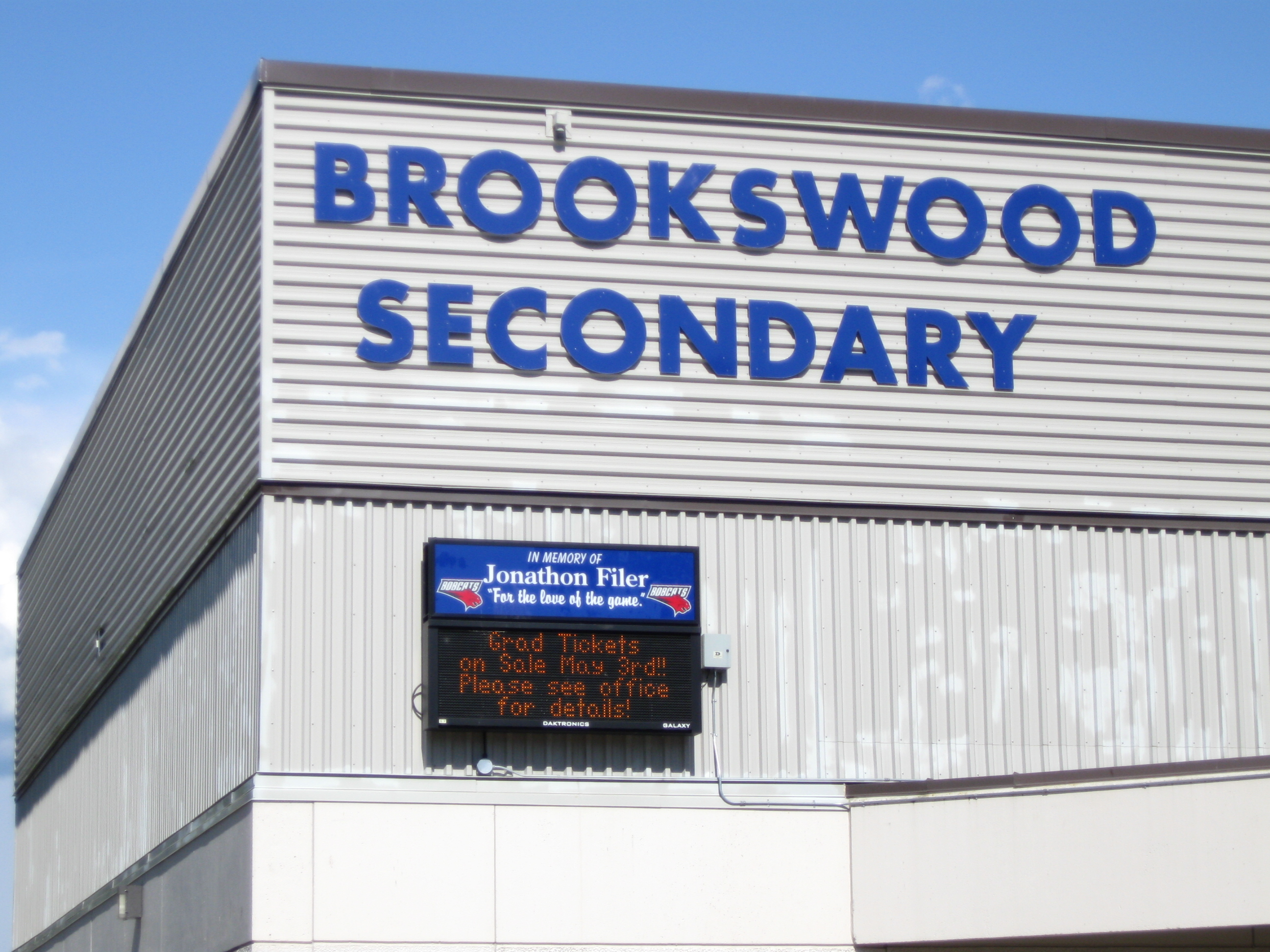
Brookswood Secondary's electronic noticeboard today

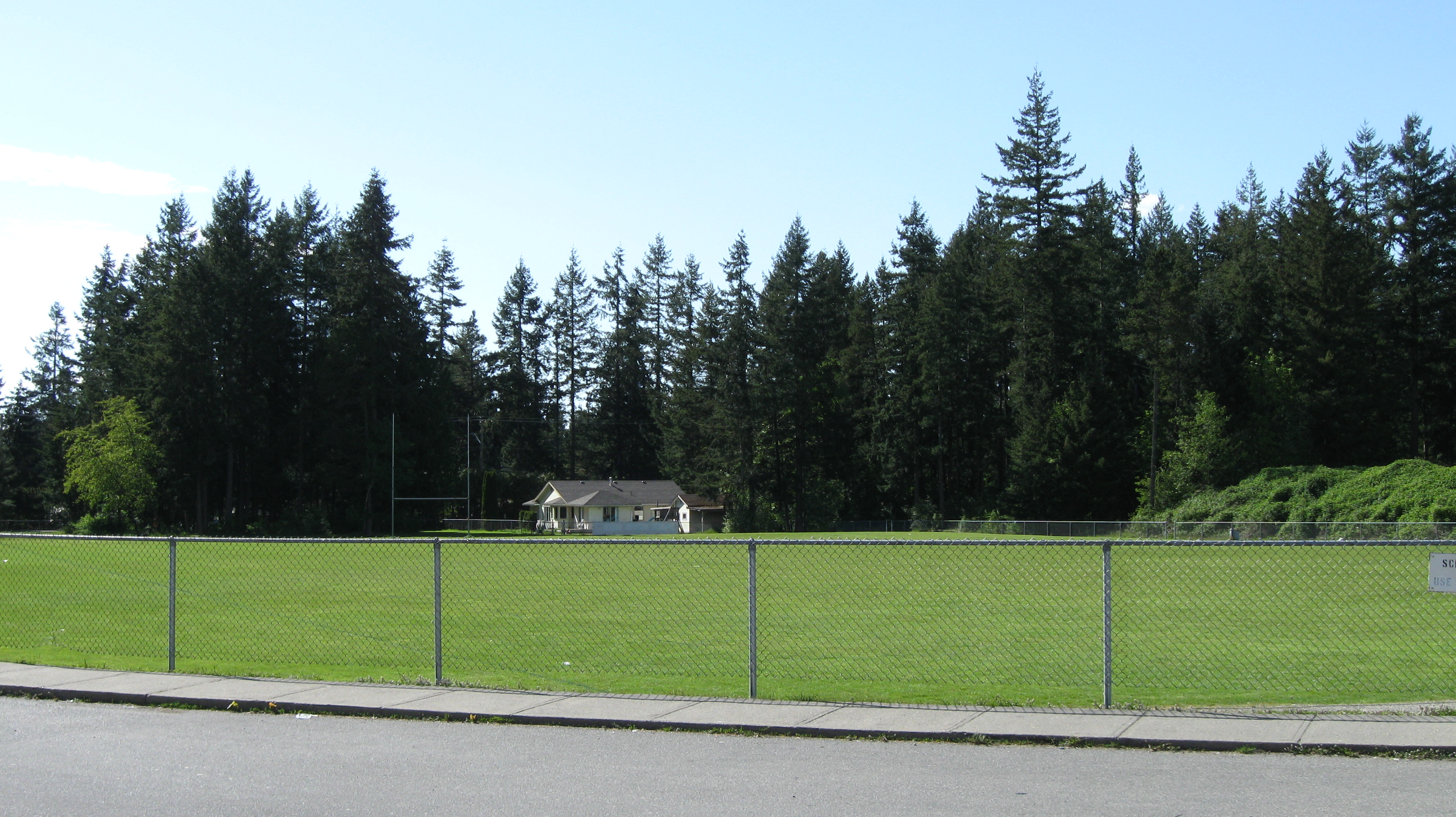
Brookswood Secondary's school field

== Notable alumni ==
- Amanda Crew — actress
- Brett Lawrie — baseball player
- Danielle Lawrie — softball player
- Chelsea McMullan — filmmaker
- Carla Qualtrough — politician
- Daniel Wesley — musician

== Sources ==
1. Langley Advance - Today in History
