= D. W. Poppy Secondary School =

D.W. Poppy Secondary

Location
- 23752 52 Ave; Langley, British Columbia, V2Z 2P3; Canada
- 49.09604°N 122.56595°W

Information
- School type: Public, high school
- Mottoes: "We don't just go to school - we go to Poppy." "Poppy Pride - striving to be the best we can be"
- Established: c.1973
- School board: School District 35 Langley
- Superintendent: Mal Gill
- School number: 3535034
- Principal: Jonathan Harris
- Staff: ~96
- Grades: 8-12
- Enrollment: ~900 (2025)
- Language: English
- Hours in school day: 6.25
- Classrooms: 45
- Campus size: 5.86ha
- Area: 142500ft²
- Colours: Red, White, Blue
- Mascot: Red Hawk
- Team name: D. W. Poppy Redhawks
- Website: dwps.sd35.bc.ca
- Last updated: 2025

D. W. Poppy Secondary is a public high school in the Township of Langley, British Columbia, Canada, and is part of School District 35 Langley. It serves much of rural Langley Township, including western portions of Aldergrove.

== History ==
The school opened in 1973 as D. W. Poppy Junior Secondary (grades 8 to 10), with the students remaining on shift at Langley Secondary for the first year. David Watkins was the first principal, holding that position for four years. There were approximately 600 students enrolled with the grade 10 students feeding into Langley Secondary or Aldergrove Secondary for their senior years. In 1975 Graham Leask became vice principal, and in 1977 he became principal.

In the first years of the school, the administration experimented with the quarter system, but presently the school is on the semester system of classes.

D. W. Poppy Secondary is situated on just over thirteen acres of land in a still-rural area of Langley. It is built of pre-cast concrete with aluminium windows. It is served by a drilled well (230 feet deep) and a septic tank system for sewage. It has five tennis courts, a floor hockey court, a basketball court, a rock dust jogging track, and three playing fields.

In 1980 the school added a grade 11 class, and in 1982 the first graduating class, with 115 members, finished grade 12. With the change from a junior to a senior school came a doubling in the size of the structure, with the addition of senior science laboratories and other classrooms. By 1983 the school had 930 students.

D.W. Poppy was one of a trio of Langley schools built from the same, or similar plans - designed to accommodate expansion. The others were R.E. Mountain Secondary School and Brookswood Secondary. After extensive renovations at all three schools, they are hardly recognizable as having evolved from the same plan. Brookswood (currently the largest of the three) and Poppy have both completed their courtyard enclosure, while Mountain remains closest to its original form.

== Notable alumni ==
- Michael Roberds (1964–2016) was a Canadian Actor.
- Brad Jalbert (1965- ) is an internationally recognized rose breeder.
- Craig Redmond (1965- ) is a retired professional ice hockey player.
