= Willoughby, Langley =

Community in Langley, British Columbia

Coordinates: 49.149°N 122.646°W

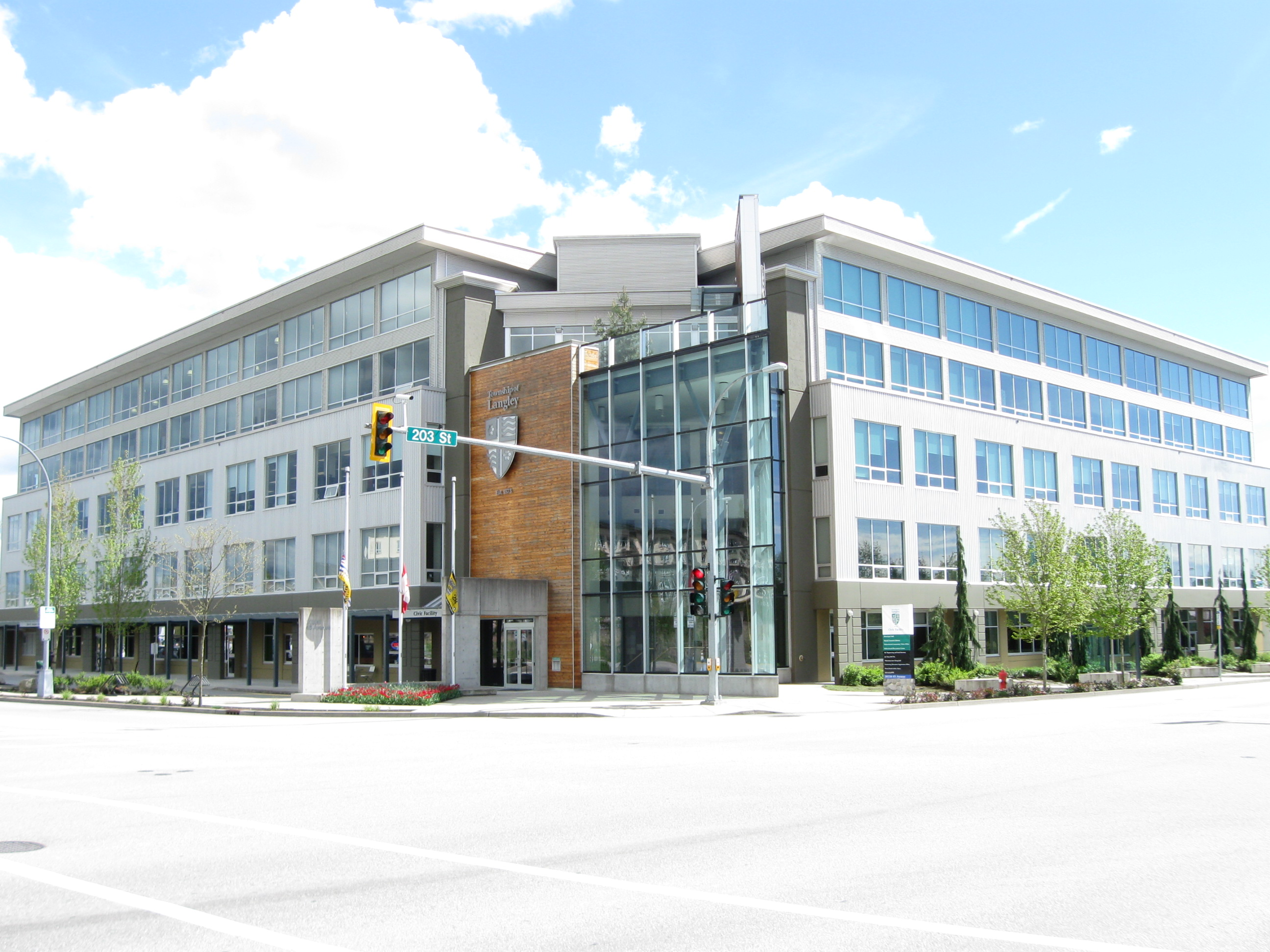
Langley Township Municipal Hall.

Willoughby, British Columbia is a community located within the Township of Langley. It is also home to the Township of Langley's municipal hall.

== Education ==
Served by School District 35 Langley, Willoughby has four elementary schools, two middle school and one high school; Richard Bulpitt Elementary School, Willoughby Elementary School, Langley Meadows Elementary School, Lynn Fripps Elementary, RC Garnet Elementary, Yorkson Creek Middle School, Peter Ewart Middle School, and R.E. Mountain Secondary School.
