= Murrayville, Langley =

Coordinates: 49°05′00″N 122°37′00″W

Murrayville
- Neighbourhood
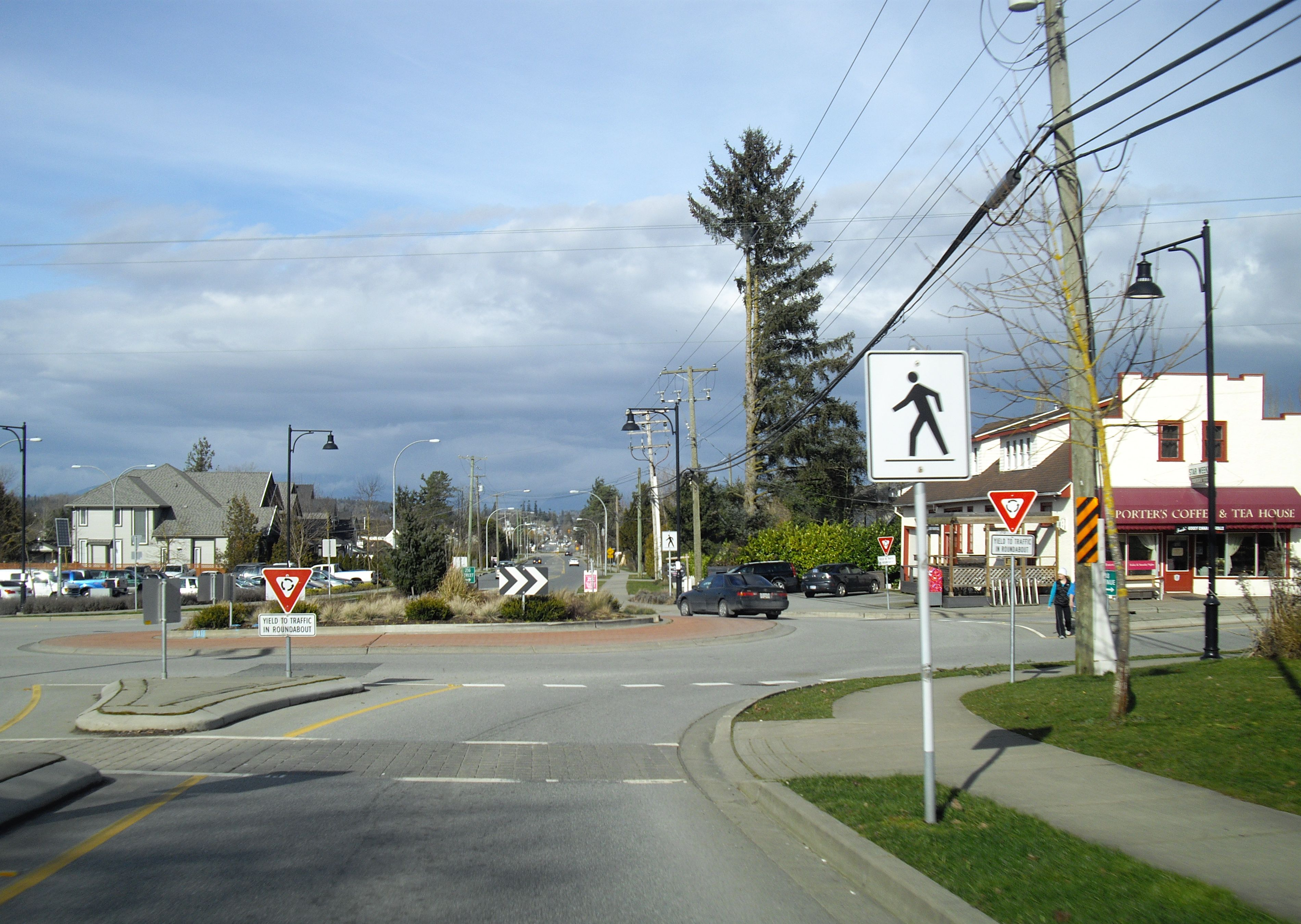
- Roundabout at the centre of Murrayville on 216th St and 48th Ave
- Interactive map of Murrayville
- Country: Canada
- Province: British Columbia
- Region: Lower Mainland
- Regional district: Metro Vancouver
- District Municipality: Langley, British Columbia (district municipality)

Government
  - Mayor of the Township of Langley: Eric Woodward

Population
  - Total: 11,420
- Time zone: UTC-8 (Pacific (PST))
  - Summer (DST): UTC-7 (PDT)

Murrayville is a small community in the Township of Langley in the Lower Mainland region of British Columbia, Canada.

== History ==
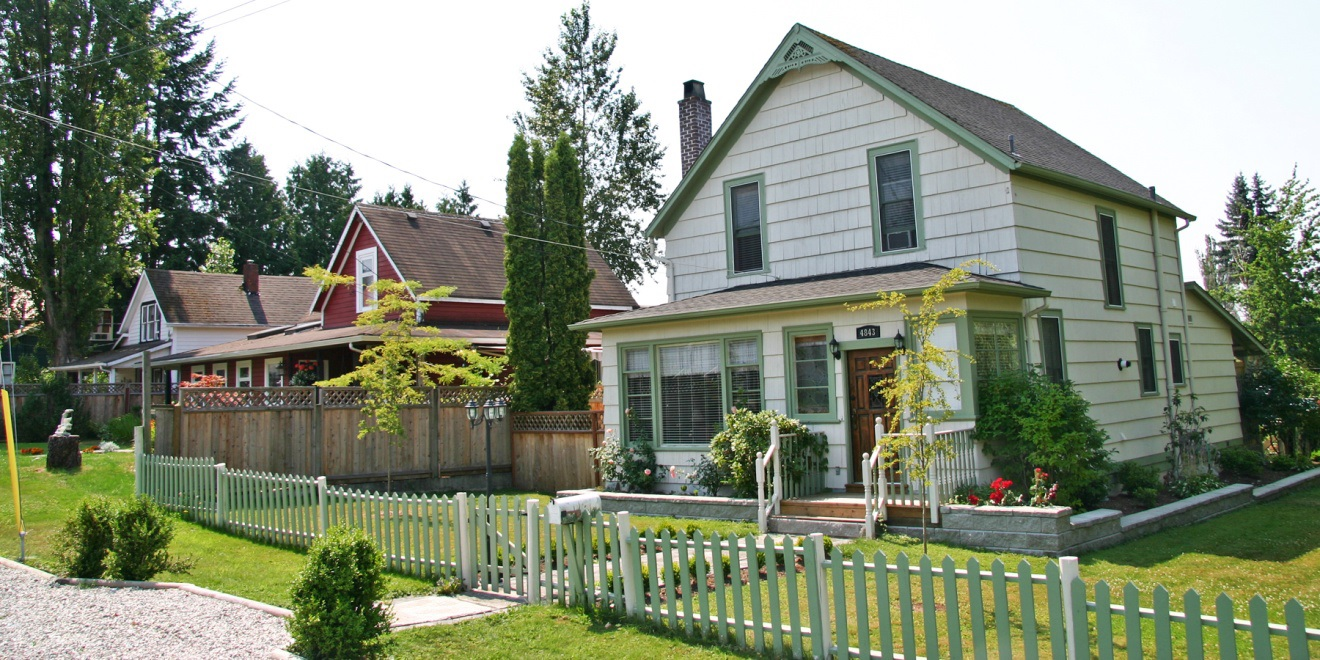
Heritage area in Murrayville between 48a Ave and 48 Ave on 216a Street

In 1870, Paul Murray settled in this location and together with his sons owned a quarter section of land on each of the four corners of Yale Road and what now is 216th Street. This area became known as "Murrays corner" after Alexander Murray, who drowned in the Fraser River in January 1884 while attempting in vain to save a friend. Originally Murray was buried at the Fort Langley Cemetery but when the Odd Fellows Cemetery opened his family exhumed his body and relocated it so that he would be closer to home.

In 1925, the post office named it "Murrayville". The area between 216 street, 216a street, 48th ave and 48A avenue is one of the oldest subdivisions in Langley. Of the eight building lots in this subdivision there are still 6 heritage houses (built before 1930).

== Features ==
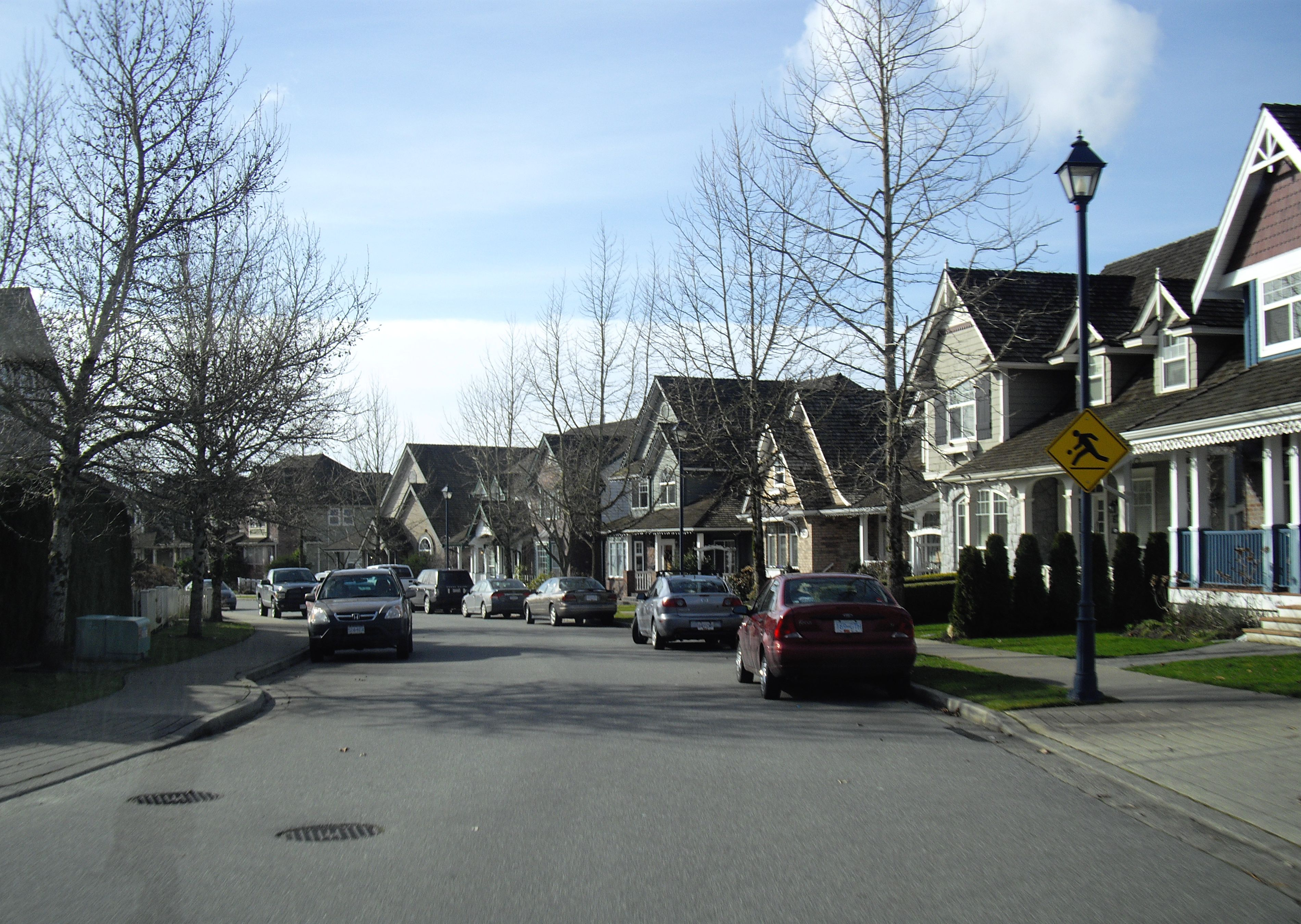
Murray's Crescent in Murrayville

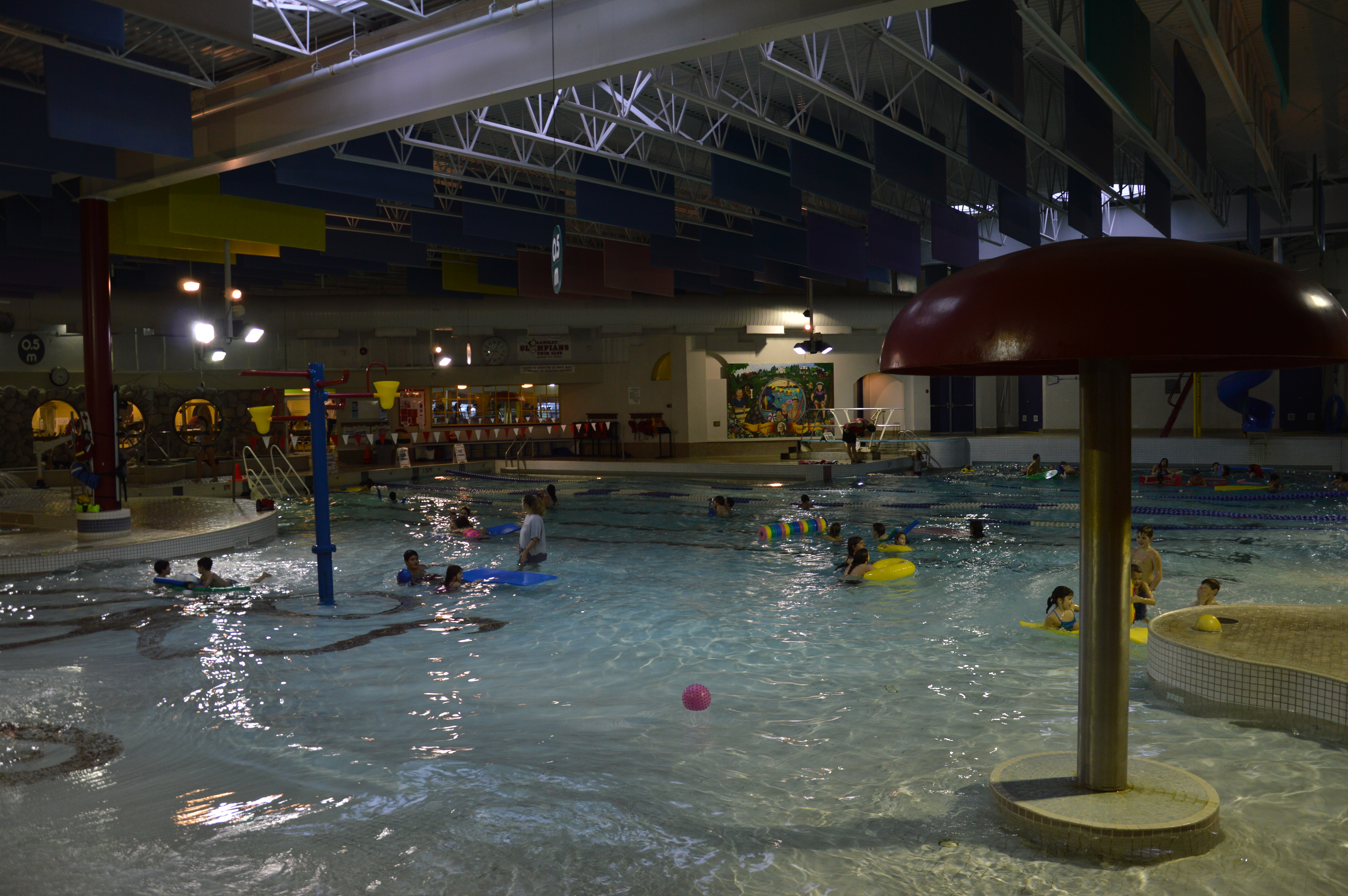
The wave pool at W.C. Blair Recreation Centre

Murrayville is the location of the Township of Langley Operations Centre, Royal Canadian Mounted Police offices, and the Langley school board office.

The neighbourhood is home to the W.C. Blair Recreation Centre, which houses a wave pool with six 25m swimming lanes and a shallow children's area, as well as a sauna and hot tub. The building also contains a 1,100 sq ft (100 m^{2}) Fitness Room, a 1,500 sq ft (140 m^{2}) weight room, a meeting room, and a multi-purpose room.

Among the historical buildings is an old church building that is currently being used by Holy Nativity Orthodox Church, and the Murrayville Community Hall which has been recently renovated inside to try to bring back some heritage aesthetic. The hall was originally donated by P.Y. Porter and is now used by area residents to hold many different types of functions.

== Education ==
Served by School District 35 Langley, Langley has four elementary schools and two high schools. The elementary schools are James Hill Elementary School, Langley Fundamental Elementary School, Credo Christian Elementary School and Murrayville Academy & Early Learning Centre. The high schools are Langley Secondary School and Credo Christian High School.

Murrayville Academy & Early Learning Centre are located on the site of the historic Murrayville Garage, within the Murrayville Conservation Area.

== Famous residents ==
- Robb Gordon
- Danny Lorenz
- Ben Heppner
- Ryan Reynolds
