= Langley Education Centre =

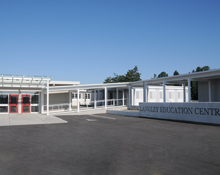

Location
- 21405A - 56th Ave; Langley, British Columbia, V2Y 2N1; Canada; 49.1040°N 122.6290°W

Information
- School type: Public, high school
- Motto: a chance for a new beginning...
- Founded: 1986
- School board: School District 35 Langley
- Superintendent: Cheryle Beaumont
- School number: 3599050
- Principal: Mr. R. Stare
- Grades: 10-12
- Enrollment: 1300 approx. (2011/2012)
- Language: English, French
- Area: Langley Township
- Public transit access: 502 Aldergrove - Stop ID: 60867; 502 Surrey Central Station - Stop ID: 60866
- Councillor: Mr. M. Ferguson
- Mission Statement: It is the mission of Langley Education Centre to provide supportive, flexible, learning programs that will enable students to grow academically and personally.
- Website: lecss.com

Langley Education Centre (LEC) is a public high school in Langley, British Columbia, part of School District 35 Langley.

LEC offers secondary school (Gr. 10–12) options for teens and adults to continue and complete a secondary education or upgrade their courses. The courses are offered one of two ways:

1. Structured, semester and blended classes meeting once or twice a week in either the morning, afternoon or evening for two to three hour periods, providing flexibility for students as to when they attend. Registration happens at the beginning of each semester in August/September, and January/February.
2. On-site and Online Directed Learning classes (Langley Online and Distributed Learning) that allow continuous intake throughout the year and allows students to work at their own pace. Students can either attend their tutorial session once a week to work with their teacher, or complete courses online, working in a web-based environment.

== History ==
Established in 1986, LEC was founded as an alternative secondary school located in commercial space at Sundel Square in the City of Langley, British Columbia (20216 Fraser Highway, Langley, BC). In November 2006, the Board of Education decided to move LEC from its original location to its new home on a shared campus with Langley Secondary School. The decision came as the Board of Education was facing budgetary constraints and underutilized facilities and LEC was facing increasingly inadequate and aging commercial space. The move was completed in February 2008 at a cost of $1.4 million. The new shared campus at Langley Secondary School provided LEC with a 900 square metre, state-of-the-art facility which includes eight classrooms: three shared with LSS, two located with the LEC office in the main building, and three in new modulars linked to the main building by covered walkways. In addition, a child minding facility on the premises.

== Structured Courses ==
=== Semestered ===
In a semestered class, students attend two classes per week for one semester (approx. 5 months)

Courses

- Biology 12
- Chemistry 11
- Chemistry 12
- Communications 11/12
- Early Psychology 12
- English 12
- Math 10, Foundations & Pre-Calculus
- Math 11, Appr. & Workplace
- Math 11, Foundations Bridge
- Math 11, Pre-Calculus
- Math 12, Principles
- Physics 11
- Physics 12

Important Information Regarding Semester Classes at LEC

- Students must be at least 16 years old as of July 1, 2011 in order to qualify for semestered classes. Students under 16 may qualify if they are part of LEC CHOICES program.
- Students may be registered and taking classes in other Langley schools and still enroll in LEC semestered classes. Students who are registered in school districts other than Langley may not be eligible for semestered classes.

=== Blended ===
In a blended class, students attend one class per week for one semester (approx. 5 months). The remainder of the course is completed through online assignments or on-site directed learning.

Courses

- Business 12
- Civics 11: Evolution or Revolution?
- Communications 12
- Digital & Social Media 12
- Family Studies 12
- History 12
- Marketing 12

Important Information Regarding Blended Classes at LEC

- Students in blended classes may also be registered in other schools or districts
- There is no age restriction for students registered in blended classes

== On-site/Online Directed Learning ==
=== On-site Directed Learning ===
The LEC Distributed Learning Program includes a variety of online and paper-based directed learning courses.

Registration for LEC DL courses occurs year-round (September - April). You have 2 semesters from the time of registration to complete your course (including the semester in which you register and the following semester).

Courses

- Biology 11
- Biology 12
- Chemistry 11
- Chemistry 12
- Civic Studies 11
- Communications 12
- Data Management 12
- English 10
- English 11
- English 12
- Family Studies 12
- French 11
- French 12
- Graduation Transitions
- History 12
- Marketing 12
- Math 10, Apprenticeship & Workplace
- Math 10, Foundations & Pre-Calculus
- Math 11, Apprenticeship & Workplace
- Math 11, Foundations
- Math 11, Pre-Calculus
- Math 12, Principles of
- Physical Education 10
- Physics 11
- Physics 12
- Planning 12
- Social Studies 10

=== Online Directed Learning ===
LEC online, developed by the Langley Education Centre, delivers high school courses in an online environment. Registration for LEC online courses occurs year-round (late August- April 30). An online course can be completed at the student's own pace within a maximum of 2 consecutive semesters. Online course work is primarily completed at home with teacher support at LEC. Exams are written at LEC.

An added feature of LEC online courses, is the availability of its teachers. Along with regular online support and contact, teachers are also available at the Langley Education Centre for tutorial sessions. Online students are welcome to come in to get "in-person" help if needed.

Courses

- Biology 12
- English 12
- Family Studies 12
- Math 11, Pre-Calculus
- Math 12, Principles
- Physical Education 10
- Planning 10
- Planning 10
- Planning 12 - ADULT
- Science 10
- Science & Technology 11

== Child Minding ==
Langley Education Centre offers childcare for students with babies and children under the age of six years (space limited). In addition, LEC provides peer support, life-skills workshops, including topics: safety in the workplace, job interview skills, field trips and social events, and a weekly parenting group, co-sponsored by Aldergrove Neighbourhood Services
