= Fraser Valley Adventist Academy =

Location
- 26026 48th Ave; Aldergrove, British Columbia, V4W 1J2; Canada; 49.0887328°N 122.5026001°W

Information
- School type: Independent K–12 School
- Religious affiliation: Seventh-day Adventist Church
- Founded: 1971
- Principal: Leidamae Muse
- Faculty: 15
- Grades: K to 12
- Enrollment: 240
- Language: English
- Area: Fraser Valley
- Colours: Royal Blue and Silver
- Mascot: Zion the Lion
- Team name: Royals
- Website: www.fvaa.net

Fraser Valley Adventist Academy (known as FVAA) is an independent Christian school located in Aldergrove, British Columbia, Canada, that offers Kindergarten through Grade 12 education from a single campus. The school is a part of the Seventh-day Adventist school system, the second largest Christian school system in the world.

== History ==
FVAA traces its roots back to a school that was founded by the Langley Seventh-day Adventist church, in the late 1940s. This original school operated as a K-9 school, and employed two teachers. This school was one of many small Adventist schools in the area.

In the late 60s, five area Adventist churches--Langley, Aldergrove, Mission, Chilliwack, and White Rock—decided that it would be best if they merged their schools and created one large school to serve the entire Fraser Valley region. A property was purchased, just north of Aldergrove, and construction began on the new school building. The school was named Fraser Valley Adventist Academy.

The first classes met in September 1971, before the school building was completed. The first year, grades K-10 were offered, and in 1974, grades 11 and 12 were added, making the school a full K-12 academy. Several more expansions were added to the facility shortly afterwards: first a gym and office building; then another classroom building was added to the back of the gym; and then in the early 90s, a new high school wing was built. Enrollment has fluctuated between 200-300 students throughout the school's history.

== Student body ==
Students are generally drawn from Surrey, BC east to Chilliwack, BC, on both sides of the Fraser River including Langley, Abbotsford, Mission, Maple Ridge and from communities in Whatcom County, Washington state. FVAA accepts international students each year.

Enrollment for the 2014-2015 year was 206 students in grades K - 12 and included 28 international students from Asia, South America and the United States.

== Academics ==
FVAA is accredited by the British Columbia Ministry of Education, and by the Board of Regents of the General Conference of Seventh-day Adventists. The school teaches the curriculum established by the British Columbia Ministry of Education, and also follows the curriculum established by the North American Division of Seventh-day Adventists for its religion courses. Graduates of FVAA receive the Dogwood Diploma when they complete Grade 12.

The school employs 15 teachers and 11 staff, maintaining a 16:1 student to teacher ratio. Subjects offered include english, math, biology, chemistry, physics, socials, physical education, and music, as well as numerous electives.

The school is owned and operated by the British Columbia Conference of Seventh-day Adventists.

== Transportation ==
FVAA contracts withValley Student Transportation Association' (or VSTA) for transportation of students to and from school. These school buses pick up students in Surrey, Langley, Aldergrove, and Abbotsford, and are responsible for bringing them to school. VSTA also provides transportation for school field trips.

== Extracurriculars ==
The FVAA Royals are a member of the Greater Vancouver Independent Schools Athletic Association, competing in boys and girls volleyball and basketball. FVAA is also a member of the Canadian Adventist Schools Athletics association, competing in flag football and volleyball. The Royals also regularly compete in tournaments hosted by Burman University and Walla Walla University, in soccer, volleyball, and basketball. The current athletic director is Kyle Kay.

Fraser Valley has a music program consisting of a senior band and choir, and various bands, choirs, and an orchestra for younger students. High school students go on a music tour every other year. The current music director is Jean Bay.

FVAA goes on a mission trip every other year, on years in which there is no music tour. The most recent mission trip was to Belize, in March 2017, during which FVAA students helped build a school near Santa Elena, held a Vacation Bible School, and hosted a daily radio program on Faith FM.

== See also ==
- Seventh-day Adventist Church
- Seventh-day Adventist education
- List of Seventh-day Adventist secondary and elementary schools
