= Erin Cebula =

Canadian television personality and reporter

- Education: BCIT
- Occupations: TV reporter and host
- Television: Global Television Network
- Spouse: Shawn Lee

Erin Cebula is a Canadian television personality and former reporter for Entertainment Tonight Canada. Cebula first became an arts and entertainment reporter for Global Tv. She is also known for her pre- and post-game coverage of the CBS show Survivor. That led to her next job as host of the TV program Urban Rush, a daily hour-long live show. In 2007, she was host of the Vancouver-based show Makeover Wish, which aired on HGTV. In 2009, after interviewing Michael Bublé multiple times for ET Canada, she asked for, and was given, a small appearance in his video for Haven't Met You Yet.

Cebula grew up in Aldergrove, British Columbia, where she was raised on a hobby farm. She obtained a diploma in television broadcasting from BCIT. Cebula was a snow instructor before getting into TV as a career. Prior to working on Urban Rush, she worked off screen as an editor for James Barber's The Urban Peasant. Cebula and her husband Shawn Lee live in Mount Pleasant, Vancouver.

As of 2014, she is the West Coast correspondent for ET Canada.
