= Daniel Wesley =

Canadian musician (born 1981)

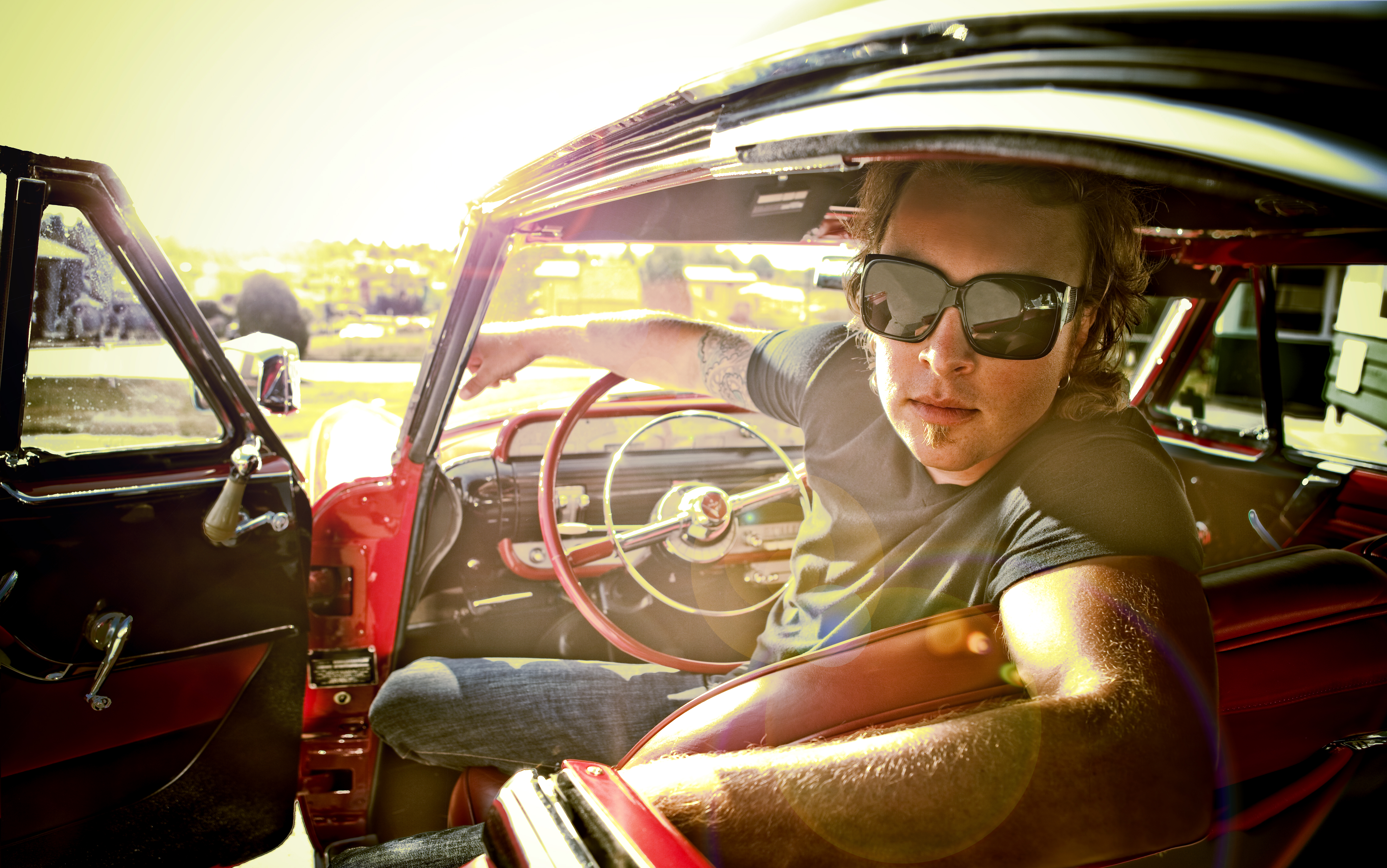
- Daniel Wesley 2009 album cover

Background information
- Born: December 30, 1981 (age 43); White Rock, British Columbia, Canada
- Genres: Alternative rock; Folk rock; Acoustic rock
- Occupation: Musician
- Instruments: guitar; vocals
- Years active: 2006–present
- Website: danielwesley.com

Daniel Wesley (born December 30, 1981) is a Canadian alternative rock musician from White Rock, British Columbia.

== Biography ==
Singer and guitarist Wesley was born in 1981 in White Rock and raised in Brookswood, British Columbia, singing in choirs since elementary school and being part of ukulele and concert bands in high school. At age 15, he formed his first band, the Dropouts, and later was front man of the bands General Mayhem, Audiophile, and Replica.

Wesley, who sometimes performs with a band aptly titled the Daniel Wesley Band, recorded his first two albums, Outlaw (2006) and Driftin' (2007), independently. His third album, Sing and Dance, proved to be a commercial success and garnered him much praise nationwide. The album also generated his most successful single to date, "Ooo Ohh". The Province rock music critic Tom Harrison wrote: "Sing and Dance has a prominent reggae element but there is also an unvarnished rock sound that sometimes recalls Neil Young."

As of 2019, Wesley has released eight studio albums, one EP, and one live recording. His latest release, titled Beach Music, came out on September 26, 2019.

== Discography ==
- Outlaw (2006)
- Driftin (2007)
- Sing and Dance (2007)
- Daniel Wesley (2009)
- Easy Livin' (2011)
- Ocean Wide (2013)
- I Am Your Man (2015)
- Beach Music EP (2019)
- Beach Music (2019)
