= School District 35 Langley =

School district in British Columbia, Canada

- School District 35 Langley logo

Location
- Langley (Murrayville) Aldergrove, Brookswood, Fort Langley, Langley City, Murrayville, Walnut Grove, Willoughby in Metro/Coast Canada

District information
- Established: April 30, 1871; 154 years ago
- Superintendent: Gordon Stewart
- Schools: 44
- Budget: CA$184.9 million

Other information
- Website: www.sd35.bc.ca

School District 35 Langley is a school district in British Columbia. This includes the municipalities of Langley Township and Langley City.

== History ==
The Langley School District is one of the earliest school districts in British Columbia. It was established on April 30, 1871, prior to British Columbia becoming part of Canada. The first teacher appointed to the Langley School board by the province of British Columbia was Mr. William W. Gibbs on June 21, 1872. There were 30 students in the district that year.

In 1906–1907, the school district formed a single board of trustees to cover all schools, rather than boards of trustees for each individual school. That year, schools in the district included Belmont, Aldergrove, Glen Valley, South Aldergrove (Patricia), Langley Prairie, Port Kells, Lochiel, Beaver, Langley, Otter, Springbrook, Glencoe, Douglas, East Langley, and Glenwood.

Grades 9 and 10 were taught in the district for the first time when a room was rented at the Billy Murray Hotel for 23 students. In 1909, the high school students were moved to the old cheese factory, and then to Belmont Superior School in 1911.

The District's first permanent secondary school, Langley High School, was opened September, 1924. After 1948, the school was converted into Langley Central Elementary School, which continued to operate until it burned down in 1993.

In December 2011, Royal Canadian Mounted Police Superintendent Derek Cooke announced that charges of sexual interference and sexual assault had been laid against a 57-year-old female teacher in the school district.

=== Langley Schools Music Project ===
The school district gained some fame in 2001 with the re-release of The Langley Schools Music Project, a collection of children's chorus recordings made from 1976 to 1977 by Canadian music teacher Hans Fenger in the Glenwood Elementary School gymnasium. The students from Glenwood, South Carvolth, Lochiel and Wix-Brown performed unique versions of pop hits by the likes of The Beach Boys, David Bowie, and Paul McCartney. The recordings were quickly forgotten until Irwin Chusid, a DJ on the New Jersey radio station WFMU rediscovered them in 2000. He managed to get them released on Bar/None Records, and they immediately created an international buzz, making many end-of-the-year best album lists in 2001. VH-1 orchestrated a reunion of the students and their teacher in 2002, and aired a documentary as well.

== Elementary schools ==
- Aldergrove Elementary School (now closed)
- Alex Hope Elementary School – named after Alexander Campbell Hope, a former member of the British Columbia assembly
- Alice Brown Elementary School
- Belmont Elementary School
- Blacklock Elementary School (Fine Arts)
- Bradshaw Elementary School (now closed) – a former bilingual public elementary school. Named after H. Bradshaw, a respected magistrate of the 1930s, Bradshaw Elementary was built in 1973 on what had been a strawberry field bounded by Anderson Creek. On Thursday, June 28, 2007, Bradshaw dismissed the students for the last time due to successive years of low enrollment.
- Coghlan Elementary School
- County Line Elementary School (now closed)
- Dorothy Peacock Elementary School is a public school in Langley, British Columbia. It was founded in 1998. The school serves students in grades kindergarten–7.
- Douglas Park Community Elementary School
- Fort Langley Elementary School
- Glenwood Elementary School
- Gordon Greenwood Elementary School
- James Hill Elementary School
- James Kennedy Elementary School
- Langley Fundamental Elementary School (K-5)
- Langley Meadows Elementary School
- Murrayville Elementary School (now closed)
- Lochiel (U-Connect) Elementary School – formerly a K–3 French immersion elementary school, closed in June 2001. Now open as a distance learning centre.
- Lynn Fripps Elementary School
- Nicomekl Elementary School
- Noel Booth Elementary School
- North Otter Elementary School
- Parkside Centennial Elementary School
- Peterson Road Elementary School
- RC Garnett Elementary School (Demonstration School K–5)
- Richard Bulpitt Elementary School
- Shortreed Elementary School
- Simonds Elementary School
- South Carvolth Environmental Elementary School (now closed) – located within the boundaries of Campbell Valley Park
- Topham Elementary School
- Uplands Elementary School / Uplands Montessori
- West Langley Elementary School
- Willoughby Elementary School
- Wix-Brown Elementary School

== Middle schools ==
- Langley Fundamental Middle School (Grades 6–8, shares a campus with the Secondary School)
- H.D. Stafford Middle School (Grades 6–8)
- Betty Gilbert Middle School (Grades 6–8)
- Yorkson Creek Middle School (Grades 6–8)
- Peter Ewart Middle School (Grades 6–8)

== Secondary schools ==
- Aldergrove Community Secondary School
- Brookswood Secondary School
- D.W. Poppy Secondary School
- Langley Secondary School
- Langley Fundamental Secondary School (9–12, shares a campus with Langley Fundamental Middle School)
- R.E. Mountain Secondary School
- Walnut Grove Secondary School

== Other ==
- Langley Education Centre
- Langley Fine Arts School (Grades 1–12)

== See also ==
- List of school districts in British Columbia
