= Aldergrove Community Secondary School =

Location
- 26850 29 Ave; Aldergrove, British Columbia, V4W 3C1; Canada; 49.055604°N 122.480925°W

Information
- School type: Public, high school
- Founded: 1958
- School board: School District 35 Langley
- School number: 3535020
- Principal: Virinder Braich
- Staff: 75
- Grades: 9-12
- Enrollment: 800 (2024)
- Language: English, French
- Colours: Blue, White, and Black
- Team name: Totems
- Website: www.acsstotems.ca
- Last updated: February 12, 2018

Aldergrove Community Secondary School is a public high school in Aldergrove, British Columbia, Canada, and is part of School District 35 Langley. It is the second oldest high school in the Langley School District, first opening its doors as Aldergrove High School in 1958.

The school currently has three Youth Train in Trades programs specializing in Automotive Service Technician, Carpentry, and Hairstylist (Cosmetology) run through the Industry Training Authority. Students enrolled in the Youth Train in Trades programs earn dual credits for attending both high school and first-year university level courses.

== Notable alumni ==
- Erin Cebula
- Frank Giustra
- Joel Waterman
