= Walnut Grove Secondary School =

- The main entrance of Walnut Grove Secondary School

Location
- 8919 Walnut Grove Dr; Langley, British Columbia, V1M 2N7; Canada; 49.16553°N 122.64117°W

Information
- School type: Secondary school
- Motto: Communiter Discimus - Together We Learn
- Founded: 1991
- School board: School District 35 Langley
- Superintendent: Suzanne Hoffman
- Principal: Mike Pue
- Grades: 8-12
- Enrollment: 2000 approx.
- Language: English, French Immersion, Spanish
- Area: Walnut Grove
- Colours: Dark green, White and Black
- Fight song: "The Gator Chomp"
- Mascot: Wally the Gator
- Team name: Walnut Grove Gators
- Website: www.wgss.ca

Walnut Grove Secondary School (WGSS) is located in the community of Walnut Grove in Langley, British Columbia. It has an enrollment of over 2,000 students, making it the largest school in Langley and one of the largest schools in the Vancouver region. As of 2009, it was the seventh largest school in the province of British Columbia. The athletic programs, led by their mascot Wally, are among the highest ranking in the province.

The school has undergone two significant capital projects since its inception, including the latest in 2001 with a new multipurpose room, classrooms, and student common spaces.

WGSS is also the location for many scenes from the Disney movie 16 Wishes.

== Principals ==
- September 1991 - December 2006 : Mary Wright
- January 2007 - February 2010 : Barry Bunyan
- February 2010 - December 2012: Jim Darby
- December 2012 – 2017: George Kozlovic
- September 2017 - June 2020: Balan Moorthy
- September 2020 – June 2025: Jeremy Lyndon
- September 2025 – Present: Mike Pue

== Athletics ==
Walnut Grove's athletics department competes at the "AAA" level. Walnut Grove also competes in boys and girls volleyball, boys and girls' rugby, ice hockey and a track and field program.

=== BC Boys Provincial Basketball Championships ===
From March 15–19, 2011, the Walnut Grove Gators Senior basketball team participated in the 66th annual BC Boys AAA Championship, after advancing through the 2011 Fraser Valley AAA Zone Tournament.

In 2012, the Gators Senior Boys Basketball Team lost the BC Boys AAA Provincial Championships to Terry Fox Secondary School. The final score was 73–72.

In 2013, the Gators Senior Boys Basketball Team won the AAA Provincial Championships over White Rock Christian Academy.

In 2017, the Gators Senior Boys Basketball Team won the AAAA Provincial Championships 78–65 over the defending champion Kelowna Secondary School. This concluded a season which included 7 major tournament wins including the Western Canada Invitational and Fraser Valley Championship. The Gators finished with a 40–1 record. This cemented the 2017 team as one of the greatest to touch the court in the provinces history.

== WGSS Cairn ==
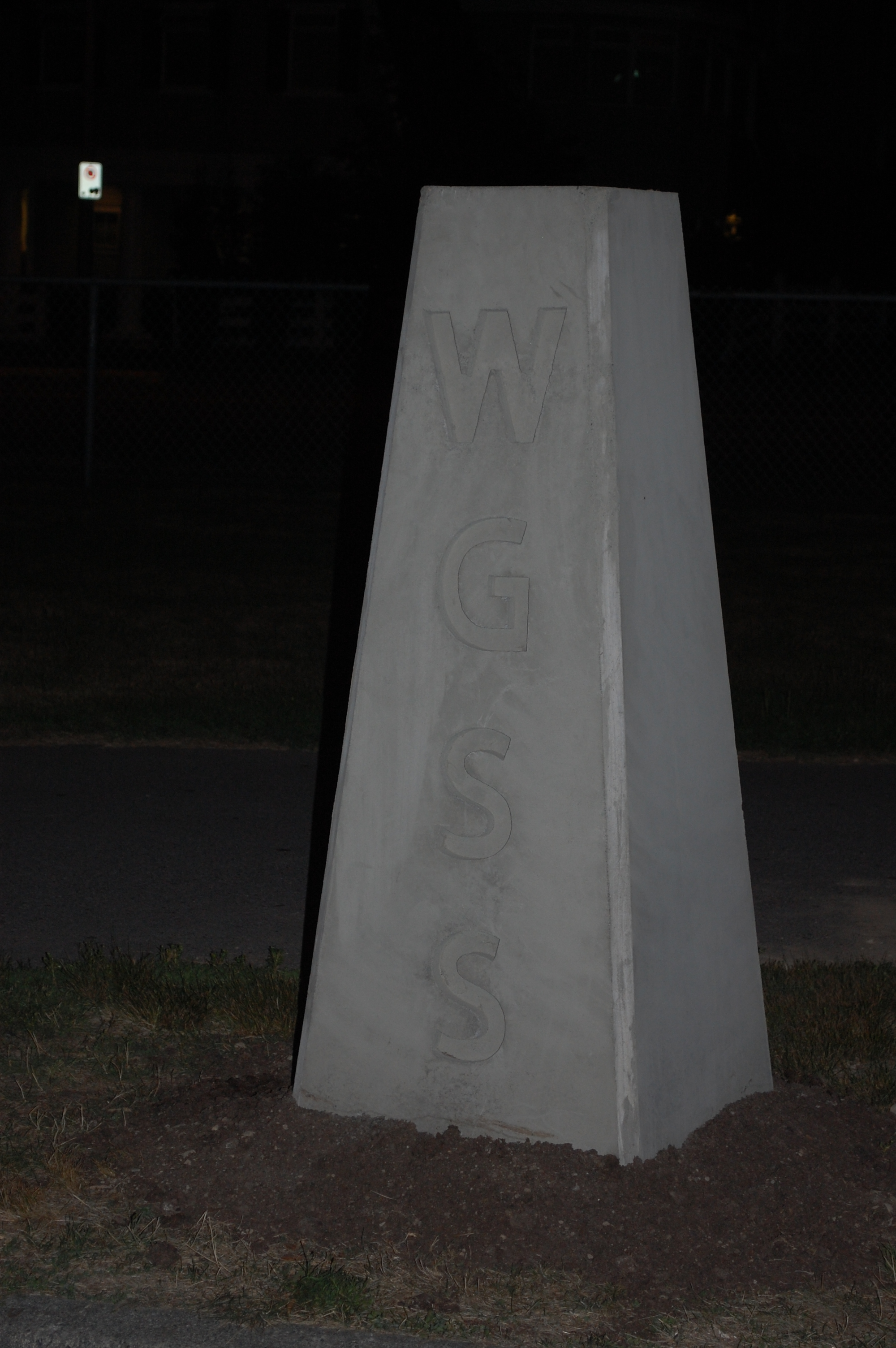
The WGSS Cairn

The WGSS Cairn was installed in late summer 2014, preceding the start of the school year.

== Fine Arts and Performing Arts ==
=== Walnut Grove music department ===
The Walnut Grove band program is split into three sections: Junior Concert Band (grade 8), Intermediate Concert Band (grade 9), and Senior Concert Band (grades 10–12). Along with the Concert Band, the music department also features a Junior-Intermediate Jazz Band (Grades 8 and 9), a Senior Jazz Band (Grades 10–12), and one of the district's only Drumline. Walnut Grove also has vocal groups, including the Concert Choir, Chamber Choir, and Vocal Jazz. The department also allows the students to take a Music Composition course, including AP.

== Notable alumni ==
- Dallas Smith - lead singer for Default, alternative and country artist
- Tara Teng - Miss B.C. World 2010, Miss Canada 2011, Miss World Canada 2012
- Lauren Southern - political activist and YouTuber
- Nick Jain - CEO of IdeaScale
- Jacob Tremblay - actor, best known for films Room and Luca
- Alexa Barajas - actress, best known for Showtime drama series Yellowjackets
