= H. D. Stafford Middle School =

H D Stafford Middle School
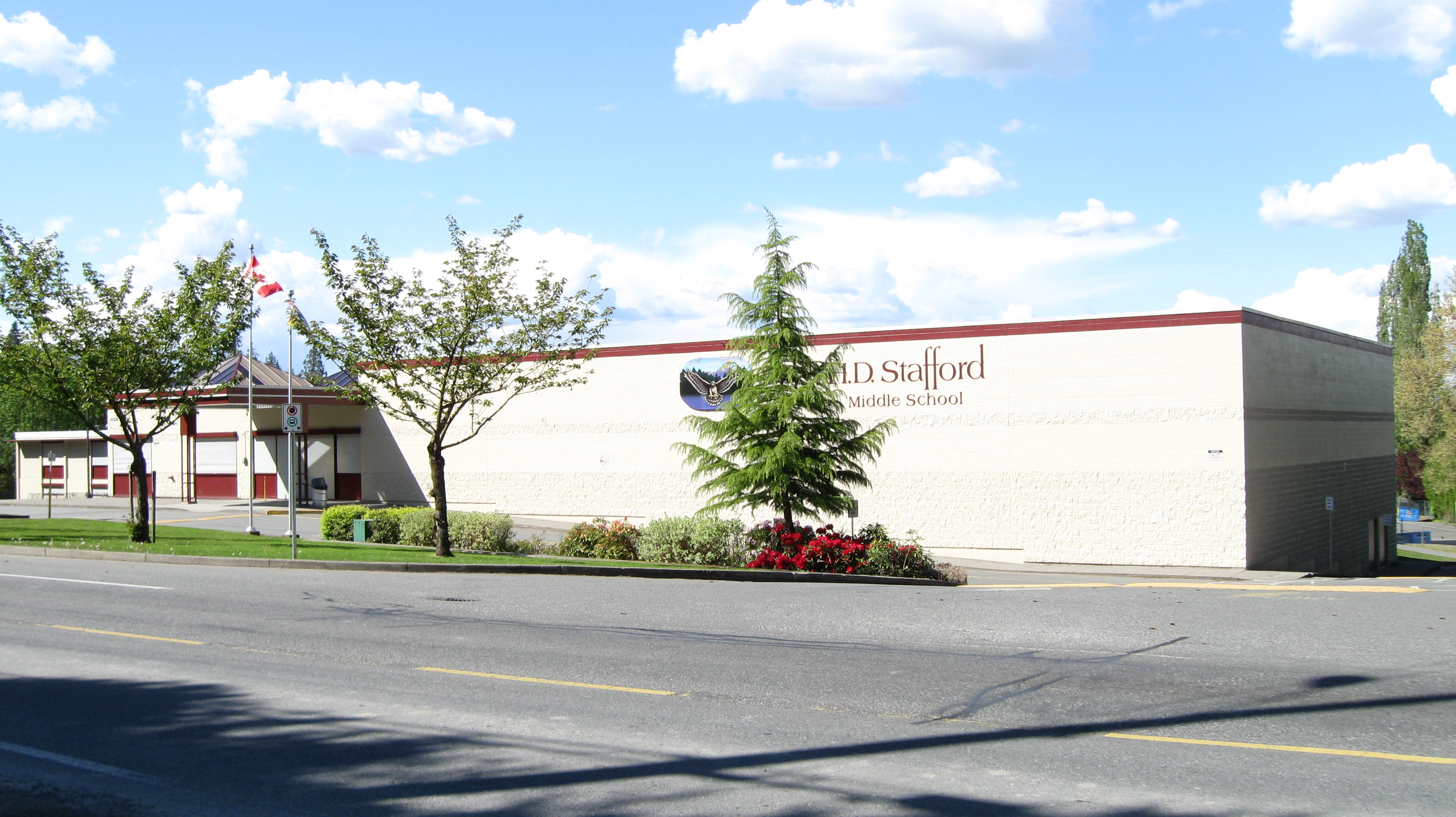

Location
- 20441 Grade Crescent; Langley, British Columbia, V3A 4J8; Canada; 49.0897°N 122.6564°W

Information
- School type: Public, middle school
- School board: School District 35 Langley
- School number: 3535031
- Principal: John Hantke
- Staff: 90
- Grades: 6-8
- Enrollment: 620 (30 September 2019)
- Language: English, French
- Colours: (Burgundy, Black and White)
- Mascot: Skyhawk
- Team name: Skyhawk
- Website: hdsms.sd35.bc.ca
- Last updated: 05 October 2019

H.D. Stafford Middle School (formerly H.D. Stafford Secondary) is a public middle school (a.k.a. junior high) in Langley, British Columbia, part of School District 35 Langley. It opened in 1970, and in the 1980s was transitioned to H.D. Stafford Secondary School – the only secondary school (a.k.a. senior high) in Langley City, as opposed to the Township of Langley – before reverting to a middle school in September 2008.

== History ==
H.D. Stafford School was originally opened as a junior high school (grades 8-10) in 1970. It was named after Harold D. Stafford, former Inspector of Schools, Administrative Officer, and later as Chief Executive Officer, all with Langley School District. Additional wings were added to the building in 1971 (west end 2-storey wing), 1974 (N.W. Room shop wing) and 1975 (N. W. Art room shop wing). In the early 1980s, an expanding population led to its transformation into a full-fledged secondary school (grades 8-12). The building was further expanded in 1994.

In 2006, H.D. Stafford's athletics expanded to include a rugby team. Teams were running at the grade 8, junior varsity and varsity levels.

=== Conversion to a middle school ===
At a school board meeting on May 22, 2007, it was revealed that the Langley School District Trustees would vote in the fall on a recommendation to transform HD Stafford from a secondary school into a middle school, serving students from Grades 6 to 8. From Grade 9 to 12, Stafford students then would attend one of the remaining secondary schools in the Langley area.

Some members of the Stafford community rallied against the changes. A march to Langley Secondary School from H.D.S.S. was held to illustrate concerns regarding the safety of students walking to and from school along busy roads. Additionally students held a walk-out en masse which took them to the school board office. Upon their arrival, Stafford students sat in silence to protest their silenced voices.

In October 2007, in a four to three vote, school board trustees voted to reconfigure HD Stafford Secondary into a Middle School.

== Notable alumni ==
- Amanda Crew, actress
- Ryan Steele, comedian
- Alisen Down, actress

== Programs ==
H.D. Stafford was one of only a handful of schools in the province to be part of a pilot project for the AVID program. AVID, Advancement Via Individual Determination, is an in-school program which prepares students for university eligibility and success. At the time of its closure as a secondary school, approximately 40% of Stafford's teachers were trained in AVID strategies.

== Fine arts ==
The school is known for its Fine Arts program, offering classes in visual arts, dance, drama and music. In particular, known for its musical productions, the school's productions have included Chicago (2004–05), and Disney's Beauty and the Beast amongst others.

In mid-2017, the decision was made to integrate the fine arts program into the regular school stream, thus enrolment in the IFA program will cease as of the 2017-18 school year.

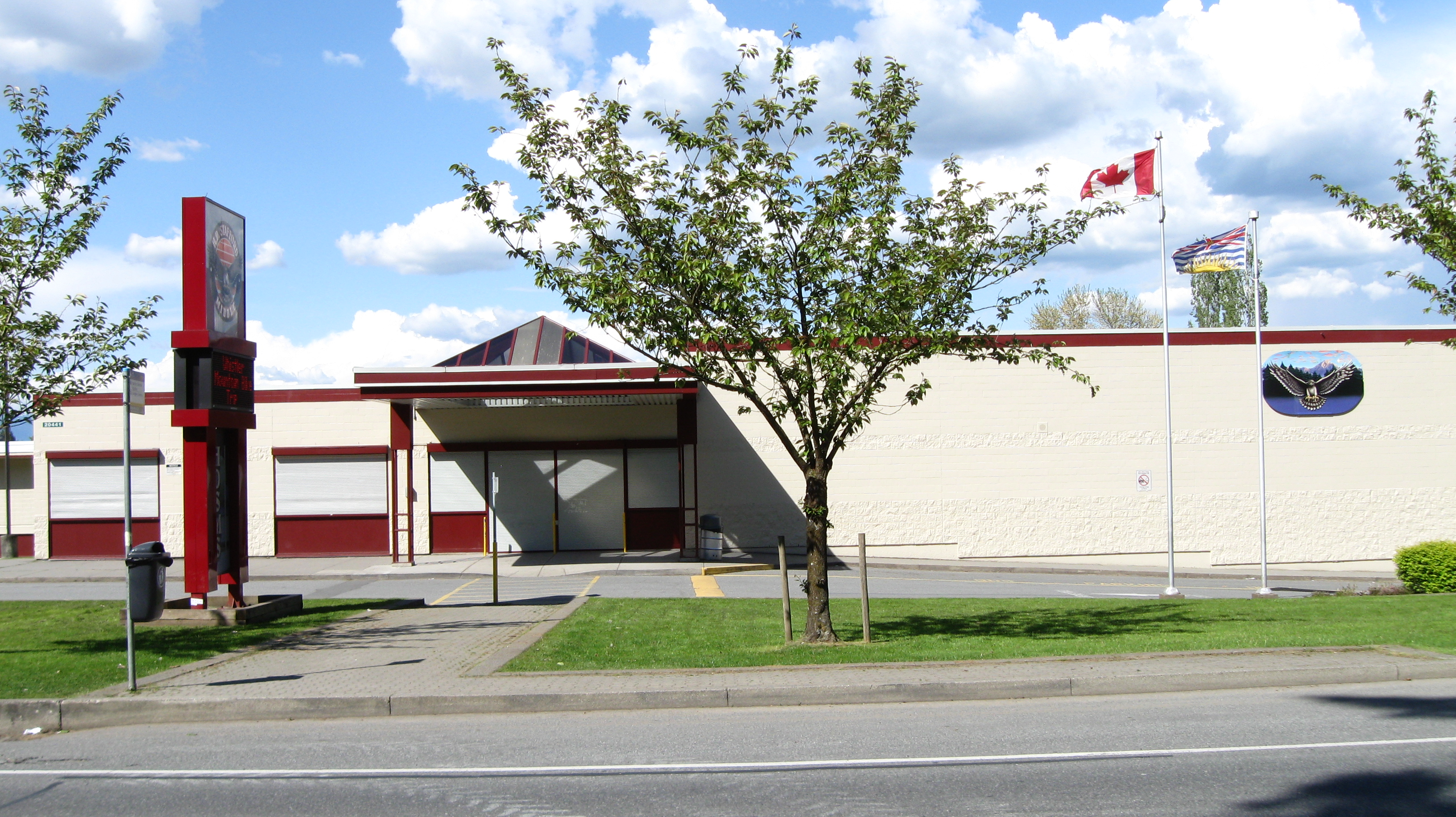
The main entrance to H.D. Stafford

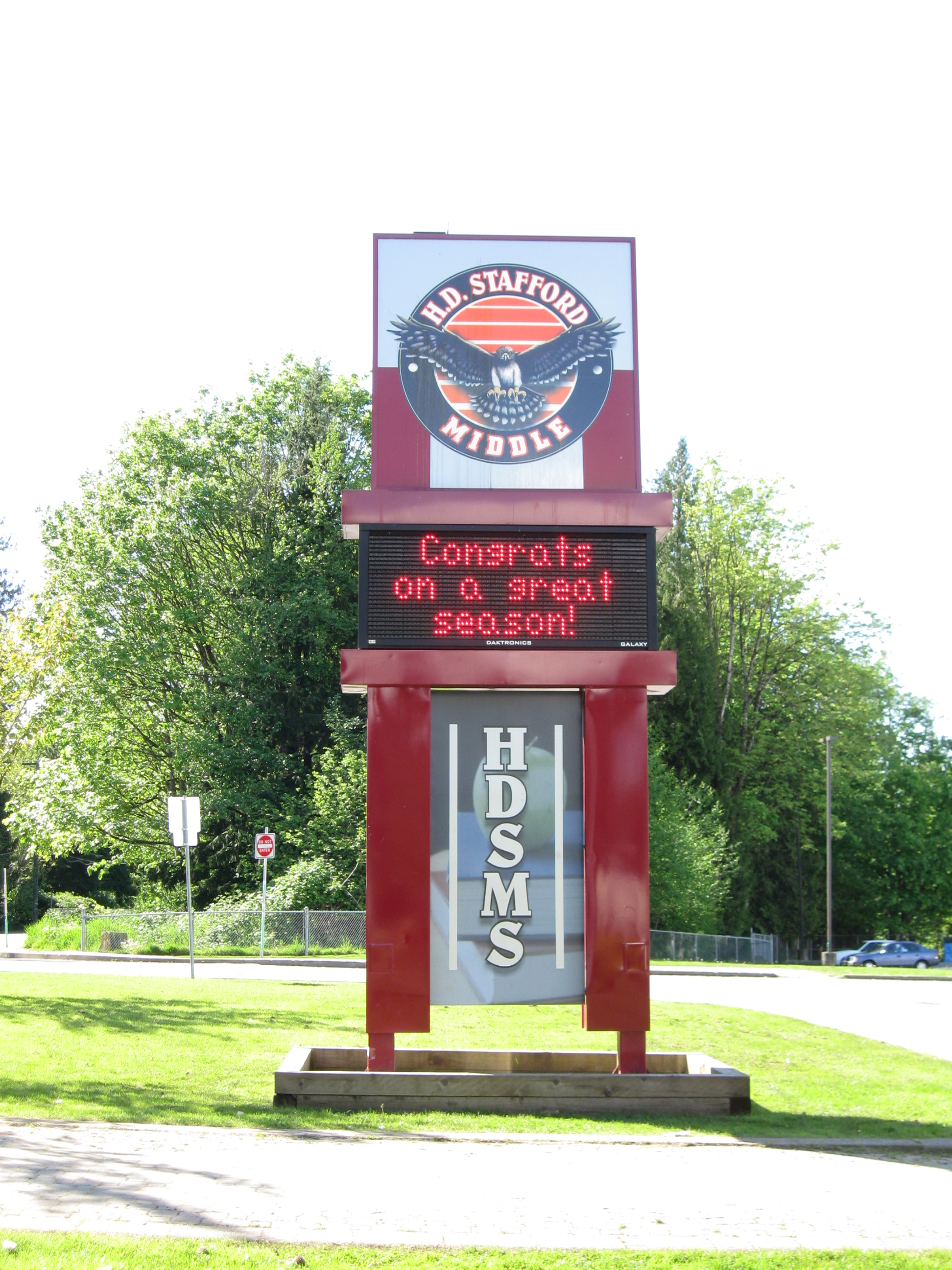
The school sign for H.D. Stafford
