= Brookswood, Langley =

Coordinates: 49°04′00″N 122°40′00″W

Brookswood
- Neighbourhood
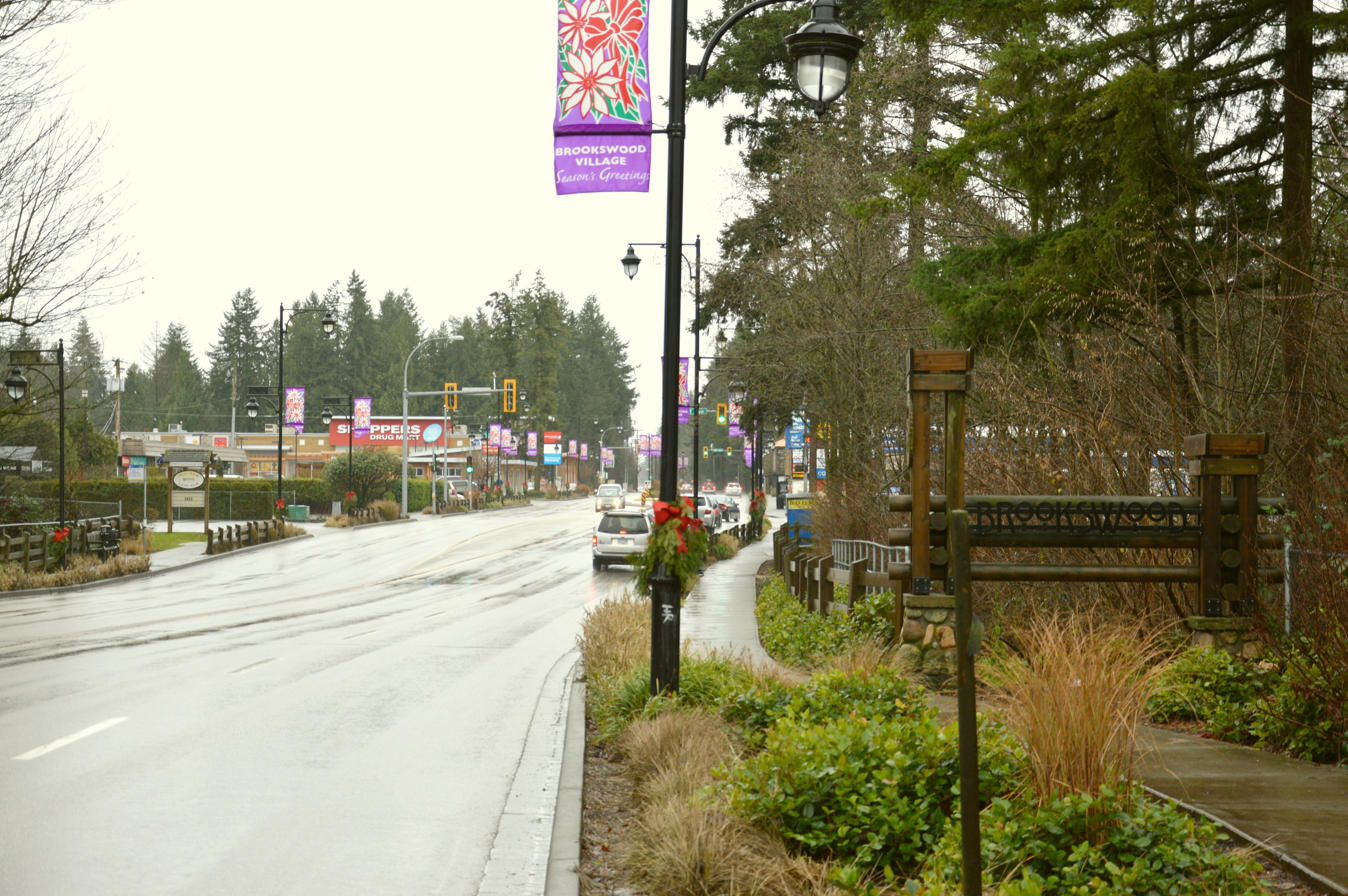
- Brookswood Village
- Interactive map of Brookswood
- Country: Canada
- Province: British Columbia
- Region: Lower Mainland
- Regional district: Metro Vancouver
- District Municipality: Langley, British Columbia (district municipality)

Population
  - Total: 13,336
- Time zone: UTC-8 (Pacific (PST))
  - Summer (DST): UTC-7 (PDT)

Brookswood is a community (pop. approx. 13,200) in the Township of Langley, British Columbia, Canada, located on the west side of that municipality to the south of the Nicomekl River. It is largely a residential area with several commercial areas, a Recreation Centre with a hockey area and curling rink.

Next to the Recreation Centre is a BMX track originally built in 1977 and a skate park in 2001. The Brookswood disc golf course at Langley Passive Park is popular with disc golf enthusiasts.

== Education in Brookswood ==
- Brookswood Secondary School
- Belmont Elementary School
- Bradshaw Elementary School
- Noel Booth Elementary School
- Langley Fundamental Middle Secondary School
- Alice Brown Elementary School

== History ==
- Built at a cost of $1,750,000, the Langley Civic Center was officially opened on November 8, 1973.
- In May 2005, the Langley Civic Center was renamed George Preston Recreation Center in honour of the man (former mayor and a local car salesman) who helped build it.
- In early June 1977 a BMX race track named Kiwanis BMX was built adjacent to the Langley Civic Center (now named George Preston Recreation Center). The land at the time was leased to the Langley Riders Horse Association who were good friend's to Doreen Spinks who secured the land as a rental agreement and the first BMX track in Langley was built. On July 8' 1981, Town Council approved funding for the rebuilding of the track. It was then moved in the 1990s to its new location (some 30 yard's from the original track) and named Langley BMX where it still remains today.
- In 2001 the Brookswood skateboard park was officially opened almost right beside it.
- The Rec Centre is the current home of the Langley Rivermen BCHL hockey club, until the Chiefs' new arena in Willoughby is completed. Ground was broken recently on the new complex, which has an estimated completion date to coincide with the start of the 2008-09 BCHL season.
