= Aldergrove, Langley =

Human settlement in British Columbia, Canada

Coordinates: 49.055°N 122.475°W

Aldergrove
- Neighbourhood
- Aldergrove
- Interactive map of Aldergrove
- Country: Canada
- Province: British Columbia
- District municipality: Langley, British Columbia
- Founder: Philip Jackman
- Named for: Alder tree (Alnus rubra)

Government
  - Body: Township of Langley
  - Mayor of the Township of Langley: Eric Woodward

Area
  - Total: 5 km^{2} (1.9 sq mi)

Population
  - Total: 13,105
  - Density: 2,621/km^{2} (6,790/sq mi)
- Time zone: UTC−08:00 (PST)
  - Summer (DST): UTC−07:00 (PDT)
- Area code: 604/778/236

Aldergrove is a community in the Township of Langley within British Columbia, Canada, approximately 59 km (37 mi) east of Vancouver. The community is urban in nature and, although not incorporated as a town, is often referred to as one. Aldergrove is located at the southeastern edge of both the Township of Langley and the Greater Vancouver metropolitan area, near the western edge of the Abbotsford metropolitan area. It is home to the Lynden–Aldergrove Border Crossing, one of the Lower Mainland's five land border crossings, connecting it with Lynden, Washington.

This is a predominantly agricultural area, with crops including medical cannabis, grown by Canopy Growth Corporation, in the British Columbia Agricultural Land Reserve area. This grow operation is the largest federally licensed cannabis facility in the world, with 3.7 hectares (400,000 sq ft) of growing space and may eventually reach 12 hectares (1,300,000 sq ft).

== Demographics ==
Aldergrove was split up into two population centres in the Canada 2016 Census, the main part in the Township of Langley and the other part in the City of Abbotsford as "Aldergrove East." Aldergrove had a population of 15,498 living in 5,280 of its 5,557 total private dwellings, a 7.1% increase from its 2011 population of 14,466. This population was divided into 12,007 residents of Aldergrove proper, in Langley; and 3,491 residents of Aldergrove East, in Abbotsford. With a land area of 9.45 km^{2} (3.65 sq mi), it had a population density of 1,640.0/km^{2} (4,247.6/sq mi) in 2016. 49.3% of the residents were male and 50.7% of the residents were female.

Canada 2016 Census		Population	% of Total Population
Visible minority group Source:	South Asian	1,820	11.7%
Visible minority group Source:	Chinese	175	1.1%
Visible minority group Source:	Black	305	2%
Visible minority group Source:	Filipino	160	1%
Visible minority group Source:	Latin American	160	1%
Visible minority group Source:	Arab	10	0.1%
Visible minority group Source:	Southeast Asian	655	4.2%
Visible minority group Source:	West Asian	30	0.2%
Visible minority group Source:	Korean	75	0.5%
Visible minority group Source:	Japanese	75	0.5%
Visible minority group Source:	Other visible minority	30	0.2%
Visible minority group Source:	Multiple visible minorities ("mixed")	105	0.7%
Total visible minority population		3,610	23.3%
Aboriginal group Source:	First Nations	680	4.4%
Aboriginal group Source:	Métis	515	3.3%
Aboriginal group Source:	Inuit	10	0.1%
Total Aboriginal population		1,135	7.3%
European Canadian		10,515	67.8%
Total population		15,498	100%

== Arts and culture ==
Aldergrove has served as a filming location for a number of films and television shows, including the A&E television series Bates Motel, which was set in the fictional town of White Pine Bay, Oregon. The set for the original home is located at Universal Studios Hollywood in Los Angeles; however, a replica was built in Aldergrove for the filming. The set was located on 272nd Street.

In 2017, location filming for the Hallmark Channel original movie Coming Home for Christmas starring Danica Mckellar took place at a large mansion in Aldergrove.

== Attractions ==
The Greater Vancouver Zoo is located in Aldergrove.

The Aldergrove Credit Union Community Centre opened in 2018, with an accompanying Otter Co-op Outdoor Experience water park, featuring water slides, a wave pool, lazy river and an aquaplay structure.

== Sports ==
Club	League	Sport	Established	Championships
Aldergrove Ironmen	PJHL	Ice hockey	2008	3

== Government ==
=== Military ===
The Royal Canadian Navy's primary communication station for the Pacific fleet is located at Naval Radio Site Aldergrove.

The Canadian military owns over one thousand acres of land just outside the main Aldergrove population area.

=== Politics ===
Langley—Aldergrove in the House of Commons of Canada.

== Infrastructure ==
=== Transportation ===
Aldergrove is served by the #503 Aldergrove/Surrey Central Station bus route. The No. 503 operates trips every half-hour between Langley Centre and Fraser Hwy and 272nd Street. It is also served by the No. 21 Central Fraser Valley Transit System bus service that connects Aldergrove to Abbotsford.

An independently run trolley service briefly serviced Aldergrove before ceasing operations.

Aldergrove is located at the junction of Highway 13 and the Fraser Highway.

== Education ==
As part of School District 35 Langley, Aldergrove has one high school, Aldergrove Community Secondary School, four elementary schools, and a middle school:

- Betty Gilbert Middle School
- Coghlan Elementary School
- North Otter Elementary School
- Parkside Centennial Elementary School
- Shortreed Elementary School

Aldergrove Elementary School had been an active school until 2007, when protests since 2005 failed to prevent closure due to running under capacity with 189 pupils in 2006. The school has since been torn down, with a new community centre built in its place.

Aldergrove also has four private schools: Khalsa School Fraser valley (26345 62), Aldergrove Christian Academy and Fraser Valley Adventist Academy, both of which are K-12 schools; and Combined Christian School.

== See also ==
- Otter Co-op
- Aldergrove Credit Union
- Grande West Transportation Group
- Canopy Growth Corporation
