= Langley Secondary School =

Langley Secondary
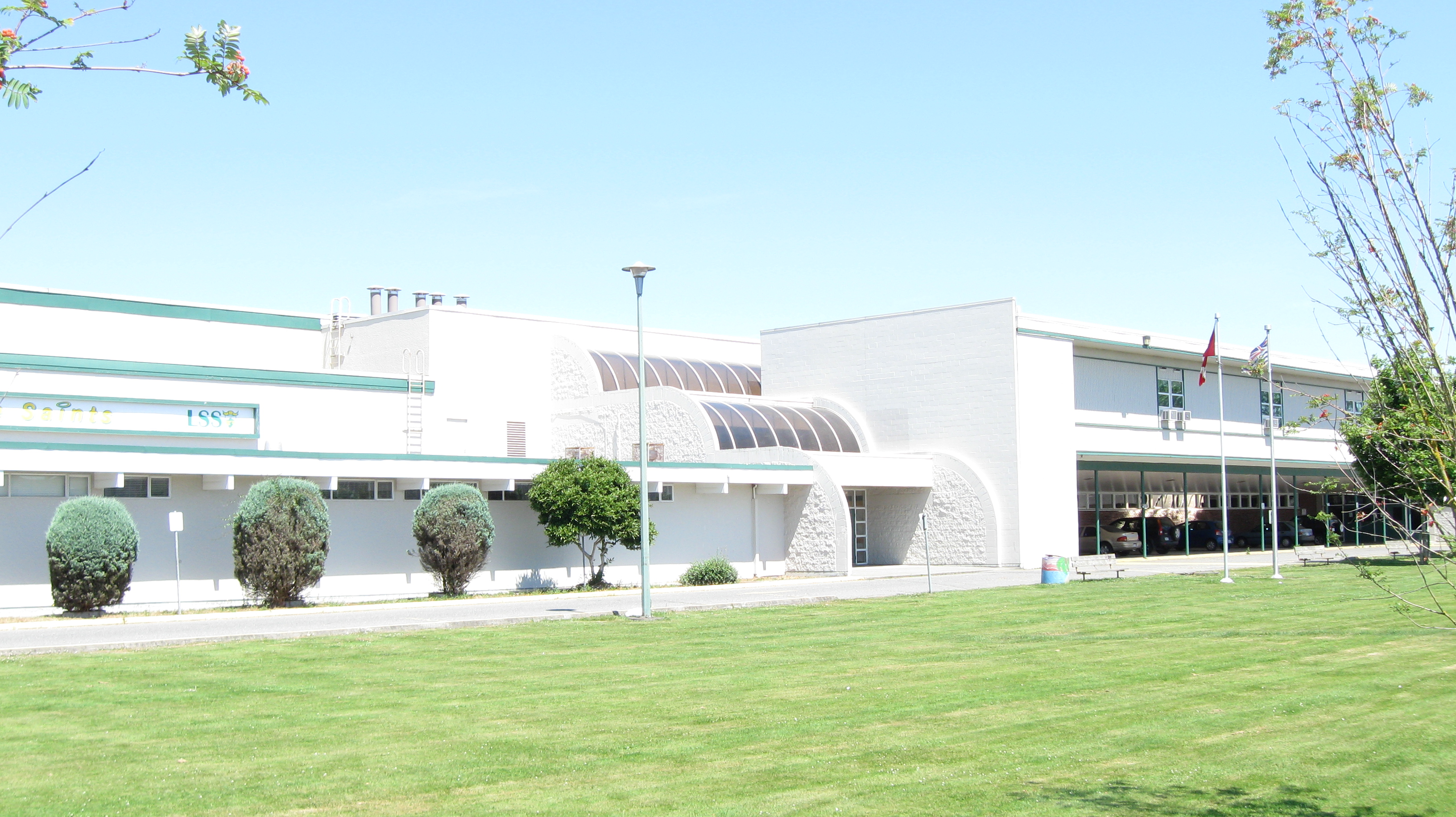

Location
- 21405 56 Avenue; Langley, British Columbia, V2Y 2N1; Canada; 49.10529°N 122.63027°W

Information
- School type: Public, high school
- Motto: Nihil Sine Opere ("Nothing Without Effort")
- Founded: 1949
- School board: School District 35 Langley
- School number: 3535019
- Staff: 100
- Grades: 9-12
- Enrollment: 1,156 (1 September 2008)
- Language: English, French, Italian and Japanese
- Colours: Green & Gold
- Team name: Thunderbirds
- Last updated: April 5, 2009

Langley Secondary is a public high school in Langley, British Columbia part of School District 35 Langley. It is the oldest secondary school in the Langley School District, having been opened in 1949.

Langley Secondary offers programs for students in Grade 9 to 12 and has strong traditions in academics, fine arts and athletics. Langley Secondary has one partner school, the HD Stafford Middle School (grades 6, 7 and 8). Langley Secondary has over 1000 students and 80 staff members. In addition to regular provincially prescribed curriculum leading to graduation, the school has academic programs including AVID and Advanced Placement. The school offers a Fine Arts Intensive Program, sports academies, an alternate academic program (Focus), and BCIT's Piping and Plumbing Program which provides post secondary credit to high school students. In addition to two gymnasiums, a combatant's room and a equipped weight room, the athletics program has access to adjacent fields, a stadium, a track and a lacrosse box.

== In popular culture ==
It has been used as one of the sets for the 2009 horror film, Jennifer's Body, starring Megan Fox and has been used in LifeTime TV's "The Pregnancy Project" along with many other films.

== Notable alumni ==
- A. Michael Baldwin, screenwriter
- Keenan Beavis, businessman and writer
- Jesse Giddings, television host for E! News and MuchMusic
- Ryan Knighton, writer
- Billeh Nickerson, writer
- Georgia Ellenwood, heptathlon athlete
