= District municipality =

Class of municipalities found in several locations

A district municipality is a designation for a class of municipalities found in several locations, including Canada, Lithuania, and South Africa.

== Canada ==
=== British Columbia ===
Under provincial law, municipalities in British Columbia are to be designated "district municipalities" on incorporation if the area to be incorporated is greater than 800 hectares (8.0 km^{2}; 2,000 acres) and has an average population density of less than 5 inhabitants per hectare (500/km^{2}; 1,300/sq mi). Municipalities may be incorporated under different classifications under the direction of the province's lieutenant governor, as is the case with the District of North Vancouver.

=== Nova Scotia ===
A district municipality, also called a rural municipality, is one of three municipal types, along with towns and regional municipalities. District municipalities and county municipalities are further considered rural municipalities. The province's twelve district municipalities are referred to as municipal districts by Statistics Canada.

=== Ontario ===
Currently, only one district municipality exists in Ontario – District Municipality of Muskoka. It was formerly a district but has undergone heavy urbanization and development, particularly from tourism, as it is the heart of Ontario's cottage country. As a result, it was "upgraded" from a district (such as neighbouring Parry Sound District) to having powers similar to a regional municipality, such as York Regional Municipality.

== South Africa ==
In South Africa, district municipalities are administrative divisions of a province. South Africa recognizes three types of municipality; metropolitan, district and local. District municipalities are made up of a number of local municipalities. The vast majority of land consists of district municipalities, with metropolitan municipalities being reserved for large cities and the areas around them. There are eight metropolitan municipalities, and 44 district municipalities subdivided into 226 local municipalities.
