= R. E. Mountain Secondary School =

R.E. Mountain Secondary School
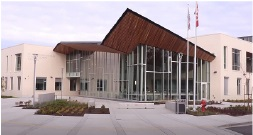
- New facility completed in 2019

Location
- 7633 202a St; Langley, British Columbia, V2Y 1W4; Canada; 49.1439°N 122.6621°W

Information
- School type: Public, high school
- Motto: "Our classroom is the world; our students are world-class."
- Founded: 1976
- School board: School District 35 Langley
- School number: 3535041
- Principal: Paul Trattle (2023)
- Staff: 178 (2023)
- Grades: 9-12
- Enrollment: 2,360 (2023)
- Language: French, Mandarin, Spanish
- Area: North Langley
- Colours: Blue, Black, and White
- Mascot: Eddie the Eagle
- Team name: Eagles
- Website: remss.sd35.bc.ca
- Last updated: September 2023

R.E. Mountain Secondary is a public high school in northern Langley, British Columbia and is a part of School District 35 Langley. It originally opened in 1977 and was relocated to a new facility in 2019. As of 2014, the school no longer offers Grade 8 as Yorkson Creek Middle School took the position. During the 2020-2021 schoolyear, the administration changed the schedule layout to a quarterly system as a response to the COVID-19 pandemic in British Columbia. In September 2023, R.E. Mountain replaced Killarney Secondary School as the largest high school in British Columbia by enrollment.

== International Baccalaureate Program ==
R.E. Mountain Secondary offers the International Baccalaureate program for Grade 11 and 12 students. It is currently the only school in Langley to offer the program. The program is preceded by the Pre-IB Honours program for grades 9 to 10. Students completing the honours program are not required to enter the IB program.

== Fine arts ==
R.E. Mountain Secondary delivers extensive IB and non-IB programs in the Arts, Music, and Drama. The school currently offers varied levels of competitive and non-competitive choirs and bands. The music program has two directors, a choir director, and a band director. The ensembles at the school include Senior Concert Choir, Senior and Intermediate Vocal Jazz, Senior Chamber Choir, Senior and Intermediate Jazz Band, and Senior and Intermediate Concert Band.

The school has a theatre company entitled "A Class Act" as well as a seasonal Improv Drama team.

There is also a visual arts program including sculpting, painting, drawing, photography, and film. The latter two are taught in separate classes, and the school has a dark room and a small film program.

== Athletics ==
Mountain has an athletics program that focuses primarily on soccer, basketball, and volleyball. The Langley Events Centre is adjacent to the school, providing facilities for extension of the school athletics. A 'Strength and Conditioning' program broadens the athletic focus to include year-round attention to non-sport specific training. The current athletics department includes rugby, badminton, ice-hockey, dragon boating, cross country running and track & field.

== Deaf and Hard Of Hearing Program ==
R.E. Mountain used to house the Langley school district's Deaf and Hard of Hearing program, but that program is no longer operating as a separate program.

== Notable alumni ==
- Lights, musician
- Dennis Cholowski, hockey player
- Kellin Deglan, baseball player
- Brad Turner, jazz musician
