= Carle Hessay =

German-Canadian painter (1911–1978)

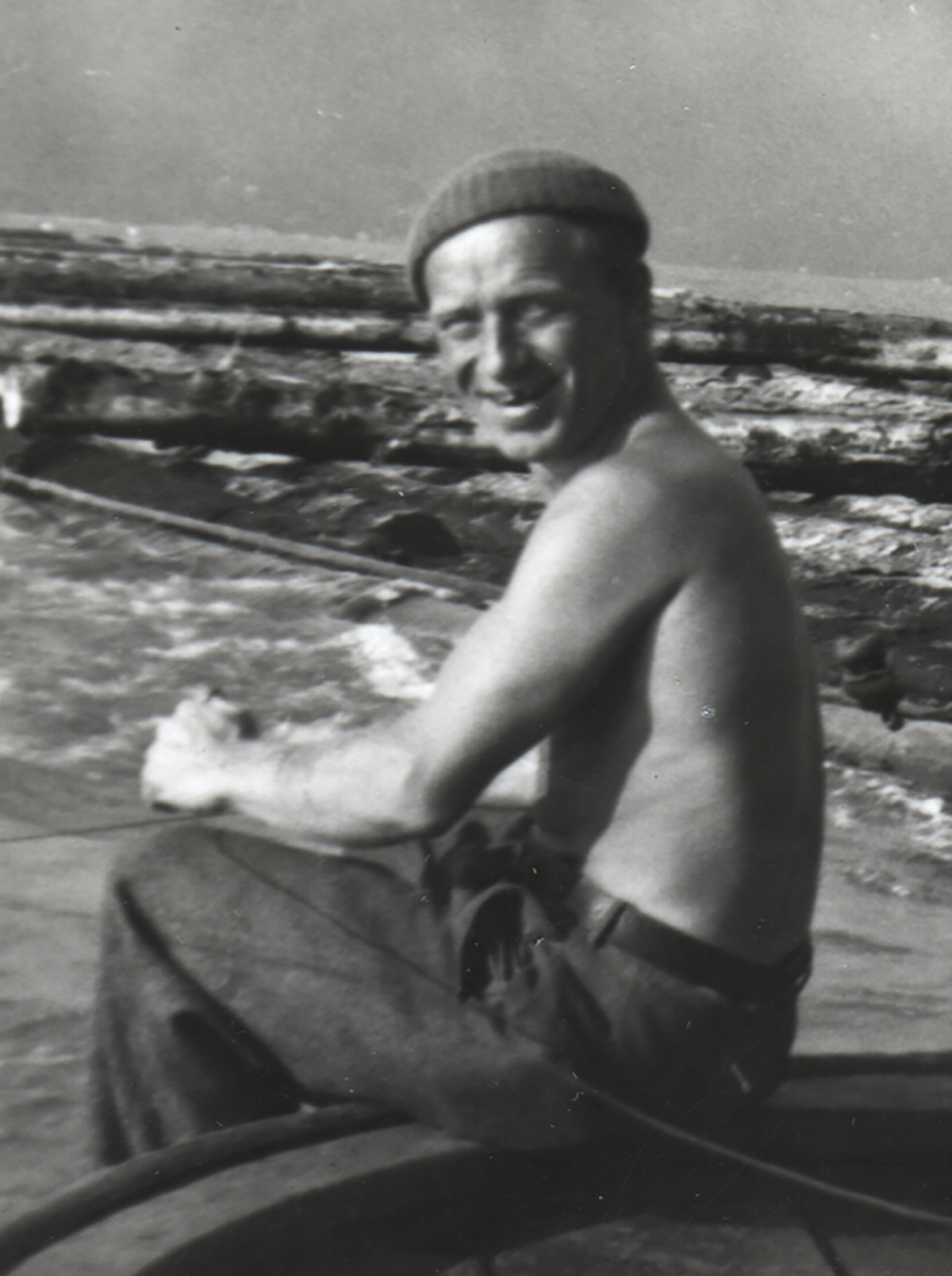
- Carle Hessay on his boat, 1940s
- Born: Hans Karl Hesse; 30 November 1911; Dresden, Germany
- Died: 1 January 1978 (aged 66); Spuzzum, British Columbia, Canada
- Education: École des Beaux-Arts, Paris, Kunstakademie Dresden
- Known for: Painter
- Movement: Expressionism

Hans Karl Hesse, known in later life as Carle Hessay (30 November 1911 – 1 January 1978), was a German-born Canadian painter. Although much remains uncertain of his early years, he immigrated to Canada in 1927, and later studied at art academies in Paris and Dresden. Hessay served as a Canadian soldier in World War II. After the establishment of peace, he moved to British Columbia, eventually settling in the town of Langley, where he took up art again in the 1950s. Some of his early paintings were done in the manner of Romantic realism. The influence of Expressionism soon became significant, with Hessay drawing on both the European and American movements, together with aspects of Emily Carr and the Group of Seven.

Hessay painted landscapes throughout his artistic life, as well as cityscapes, the Spanish Civil War, Biblical prophecy, and conceptions of the far future. A sizable fraction of his output consisted of abstract pieces. Over time, Hessay's depictions grew more symbolic, one commentator describing his late work as "brazenly metaphysical and apocalyptic". He often made his own pigments, and his style is distinguished by his use of colour, especially black. In 2014, a group of Canadian writers published poems based on his small abstracts. Hessay was the subject of a 2017 documentary film and art exhibition at the University of Victoria.

== Early life ==
Hessay was born as Hans Karl Hesse in Dresden, Germany, on 30 November 1911. (Note: While his certificate of Canadian citizenship states Dresden to be his birthplace, some newspaper articles from the 1970s report he was born in Shanghai.) Accounts of the first few decades of his life are fragmentary and sometimes contradictory. His father worked as a shipping agent for Norddeutscher Lloyd until World War II. Hessay attended a boarding school run by monks in Vienna, but he ran away to Bulgaria and eventually to Constantinople. He was caught by police and deported back, where he was severely punished. Six months later, Hessay ran away again, this time to the Dutch coast. He worked on a herring boat and recalled scaling fish in Arctic seas. Despite these travails, Hessay received a well-rounded education that included art, history, languages, and gymnastics. In 1927, just before turning sixteen, he immigrated to Canada with his mother on the CPR steamship Montrose.

Having begun painting at the age of fourteen, Hessay soon returned to Europe where a sympathetic boat captain allowed him to attend art school during the off season. He studied at the École des Beaux-Arts in Paris and the Kunstakademie in Dresden. He learned how to isolate pigments and create glazes, skills he later used in making his own colours from minerals and plants.

Hessay left Germany when the Nazi party came to power. He then led a vagabond life, travelling the world periodically as a commercial mariner, rising to the position of second mate. For some time he did drawings and watercolours from medical slides in French Chad. His first glimpse of British Columbia occurred at Port Alberni, when his ship arrived to load lumber. Impressed by the climate, he wanted to record the geography, sea, and rocks of the area. Hessay fought in the Spanish Civil War for a short period. While his boat was docked in Spain, he was captured and imprisoned by Moorish guards. Since he spoke several languages, he was given greater freedom while being put to work translating letters. Hessay organized an escape party that stole a small boat and crossed the Mediterranean Sea to Africa. In 1938, he arrived back in Canada, and went on to serve in the Second World War as a corporal in the Royal Canadian Engineers. He was the sole surviving member of a platoon that cleared minefields.

== British Columbia ==
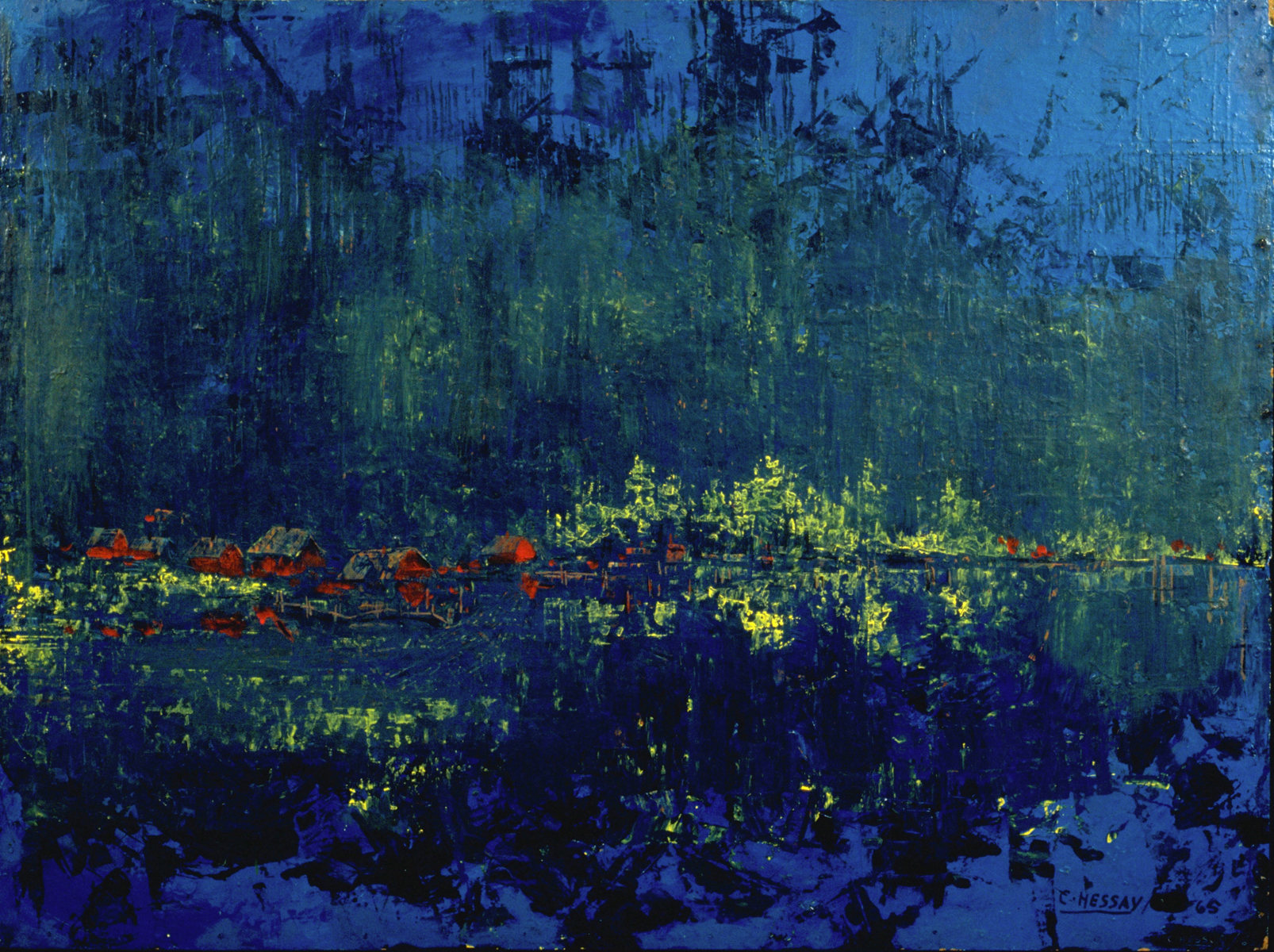
Forgotten Logging Camp. 1965.

Hessay's first home in British Columbia after WWII was a shanty on Passage Island. In spite of being impaired by posttraumatic stress disorder, he took up the life of a fisherman. He then worked briefly in a commercial arts studio in Vancouver where he made posters for the Lyric Theatre.

In 1950, Hessay moved to Langley, a town in the Fraser Valley. He soon met Langley resident Leonard Woods, a former student of LeMoine FitzGerald, and a multi-talented sculptor, musician, poet, and art historian. At the time of their first meeting, Woods was reopening the sculpture department at the Vancouver School of Art. In a later recollection, Woods described Hessay as being "in a very critical condition, mentally and physically". The pair became life-long friends, and Hessay valued Woods' encouragement within a loosely knit artistic circle that included the painter Peter Ewart, along with John McTaggart, an art teacher at Langley High School.

In Langley, he opened up a sign shop, in the days when signs were still made by hand. Hessay lived in a rear curtained-off area, his furnishings consisting of a cot, hot plate, and table and chairs. (Note: An advertisement in the 1953 Fraser Valley directory, for "Hessay Signs & Posters", located in the Ayres Block, Langley Prairie, lists his services for "Attractive Sho'Cards, Posters, Banners, Signs, Murals, and Truck Lettering". Hessay's second sign shop was above a Chevron gas station owned by William Barron Jr., across the street from the Langley Hotel. In 1972, he exhibited his signs and posters at the Surrey Art Gallery.) When he returned to creating art in the early 1950s, these spartan accommodations doubly functioned as a studio. According to Woods, "paintings were everywhere". On weekends, he often closed his shop to travel to the Fraser Canyon and the British Columbia interior, where he panned for gold. Hessay once had a prospector's shack near the Old Alexandra Bridge, in the vicinity of Spuzzum. He enjoyed visiting First Nations reserves, where he found social acceptance. His artistic output was initially reflective of his European training. Aware of experiments taking place in New York and California, he began to produce many works of pure or semi-abstraction, alongside his landscapes inspired by the British Columbia wilderness. A member of the Federation of Canadian Artists, he participated in group exhibits, displayed at local art galleries, and had one-man shows in British Columbia and elsewhere. Hessay died of a heart attack on 1 January 1978 while attending a New Year's dance at the Sasquatch Inn in Spuzzum. He is buried at Langley Lawn Cemetery.

== Artistry ==
=== Painting materials and technique ===
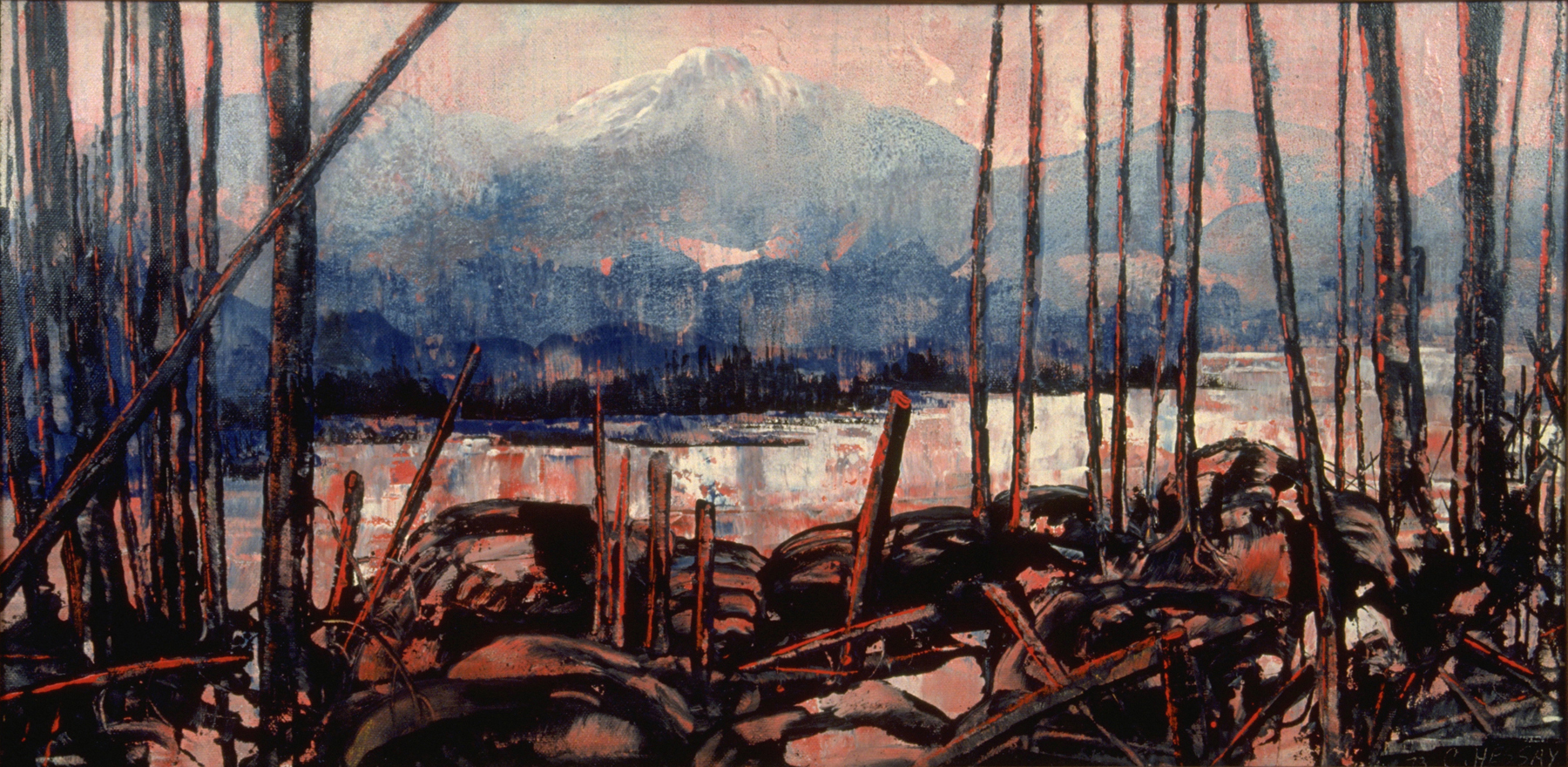
From Here to Eternity. 1973.

Hessay commonly experimented with mixed media. Having an interest in the chemistry of painting, he often made his own pigments from minerals and resins gathered on his prospecting trips. Black was derived from grinding manganese. He also employed cooked fruits and vegetables, such as onion-skin dyes, potato water, and carrots. Further materials included egg white and house paint. His canvases were prepared with fifteen coats of gesso ground made according to his own formula.

In the manner of action painting, Hessay frequently painted in a free and vigorous manner, spilling and dragging pigments over one another. One of his paintings was done with a toothbrush.

=== Style ===
His early paintings from the late 1950s were in the style of Romantic realism, one critic describing them as "pretty but not sentimental". From his Dresden background, he retained the aesthetic qualities of the German Expressionist painters Emil Nolde, Max Beckmann, and Franz Marc. This enduring early influence, overlaid by the Canadian landscape tradition, gives a unique quality to much of his work. Hessay appreciated First Nations art, admiring the Kwakwaka'wakw artist Mungo Martin, and he knew Bill Reid. His aim in painting was to create a "new, original experience", and his paintings typically emote drama and intensity of feeling, rather than lyricism. Many contain a predominance of strongly contrasting shapes and angles. His painting Immigrant Mother and Child employs instability and distorted perspectives, a psychological reflection on his first arrival to Canada.

Hessay characteristically used colour to register a dominant emotional tone, reinforcing the thematic content. He considered black to be his trademark as a painter. The monochrome ochre and setting of Abandoned Village, a painting from his Cabins to Cities series, recalls the mood of Emily Carr's Blunden Harbour. At times his landscapes have parallels to those of the Group of Seven. Some of his works lack any reference points, and fit comfortably within the history of Abstract expressionism. Other semi-abstract pieces are infused with hints of nature, commonly oriented by a feature which directs the viewer's perception. Several abstracts relate to his prospecting in their evocation of rock formations.

=== Themes ===
Hessay's paintings reference a wide spectrum of contemporary and historical material, ranging from the modern city, to scenes inspired by mythology and the Bible, the horrors of war, futuristic visions, and the place of humanity within nature. He liked his pictures to tell a story, but preferred to leave their interpretation up to the viewer. When asked once if his paintings were symbolic, he replied, "of course they are".

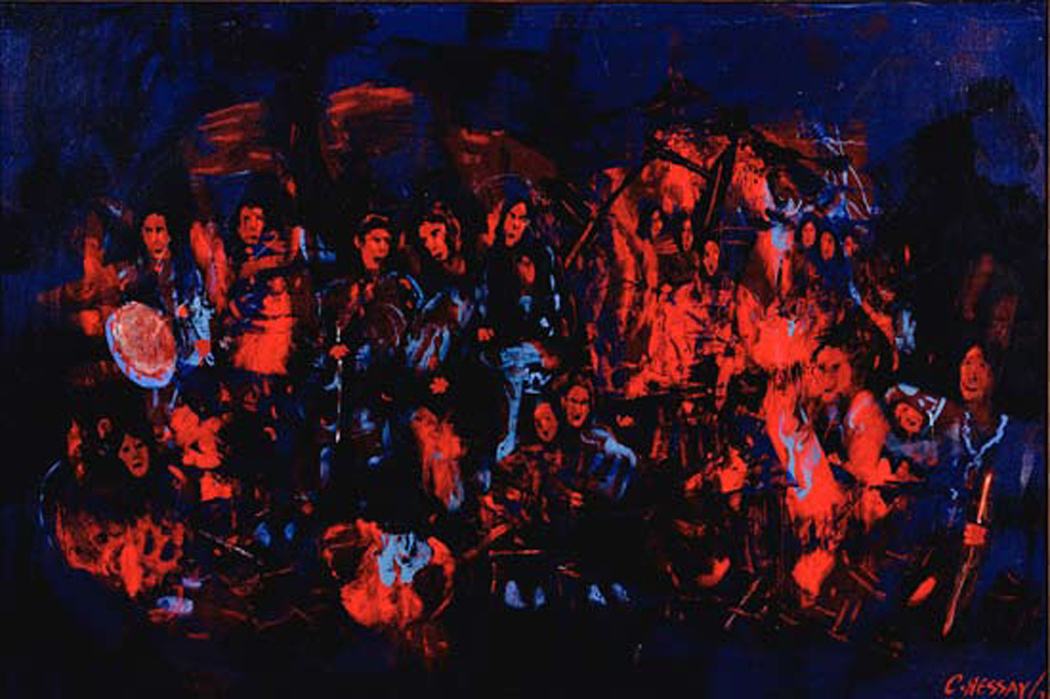
Wake for a Shuswap. 1971.

The artist's landscapes frequently place the observer squarely within the midst of an untamed wilderness, in the deadfall of roots and tree trunks, the chaos of fallen rocks, a great depth of snow, or the center of a great swamp. Some indirectly represent the destructive forces of history, as seen in a fairly literal view of Mount Baker in From Here to Eternity, with its overall pink ground colour; or the enameled hues of the large Magenta Fire. As a consequence of witnessing injustice and cruelty, he had a penchant for painting flames. Hessay was an advocate of social justice and protecting the environment. His landscapes often contain signs or remains of human dwellings: forgotten logging camps, a prospector's shack, derelict habitations. Many paintings demonstrate his love of nature, illustrated by Above the Yalakom, with its fluid design of trees and slopes. In 1967, he created a six by nine foot mural, a depiction of a waterfall cascading from a mountain lake, for the Langley Evangelical Free Church. In Woods' view, Hessay drew on his childhood learning steeped in the Bible, and the mural reinterprets Mount Lebanon, the Sea of Galilee, and the River Jordan in a Canadian context. His last painting, the peaceful landscape Break of Day, completed in 1977, is atypical among those of his final decade, with its use of soft harmonies and rounded contours.

Hessay sometimes used religious allusions as metaphors illustrating the conditions that threaten modern society. The Number of Man refers to the Book of Revelation, and its complex montage of sinister apparitions and skulls is deliberately obscure. Various late works are shamanistic and metaphysical, such as the sacral Wake for a Shuswap. This 1971 painting depicts a Secwepemc First Nations memorial taking place around a fire, the participants saturated in bright reds and blues, enveloped by the blackness of night. In Waiting at Wounded Knee, Hessay depicts the reenactment of the Ghost Dance by the Oglala Lakota during the 1973 Wounded Knee Occupation. Injustice to Indigenous peoples is also reflected in other works. A few of his canvases record his experiences in the Spanish Civil War, seen in the ethereal La Pasionaria (Dolores Ibárruri) at the Jarama River. Other war scenes are based on Biblical prophecy or classical history.

His ambivalence towards urban centres is captured in a small number of cityscapes, shown by The Great City, in which his crystalline treatment contrasts with the rubble-strewn setting at the base of an arched viaduct. As part of a Canada Council Explorations project, he created a series of futuristic paintings entitled The Hollow World, destined for the Vancouver Planetarium, but never exhibited in his lifetime. Imaginatively beginning in the year 3000 A.D., they reveal how civilization might unfold, when engineering feats could make possible the creation of new worlds.

== Personal life ==
Hessay taught himself gymnastics by training on poles attached to two trees, and a 1943 letter of reference from the Canadian Armed Forces described him as an "all-around apparatus man", and being a capable instructor. Even in his sixties, he liked to entertain by doing handstands, and perform diving feats. Hessay believed that music, which he studied in his youth, was the highest art form, and he played the piano well. At the Lion's Club and the Canadian Legion, his music often paid for his supper, and he liked to listen to operas while painting. Self-educated in many ways, Hessay had an excellent knowledge of science, mythology, and ancient philosophy, and he could quote classical literature by heart.

== Legacy ==
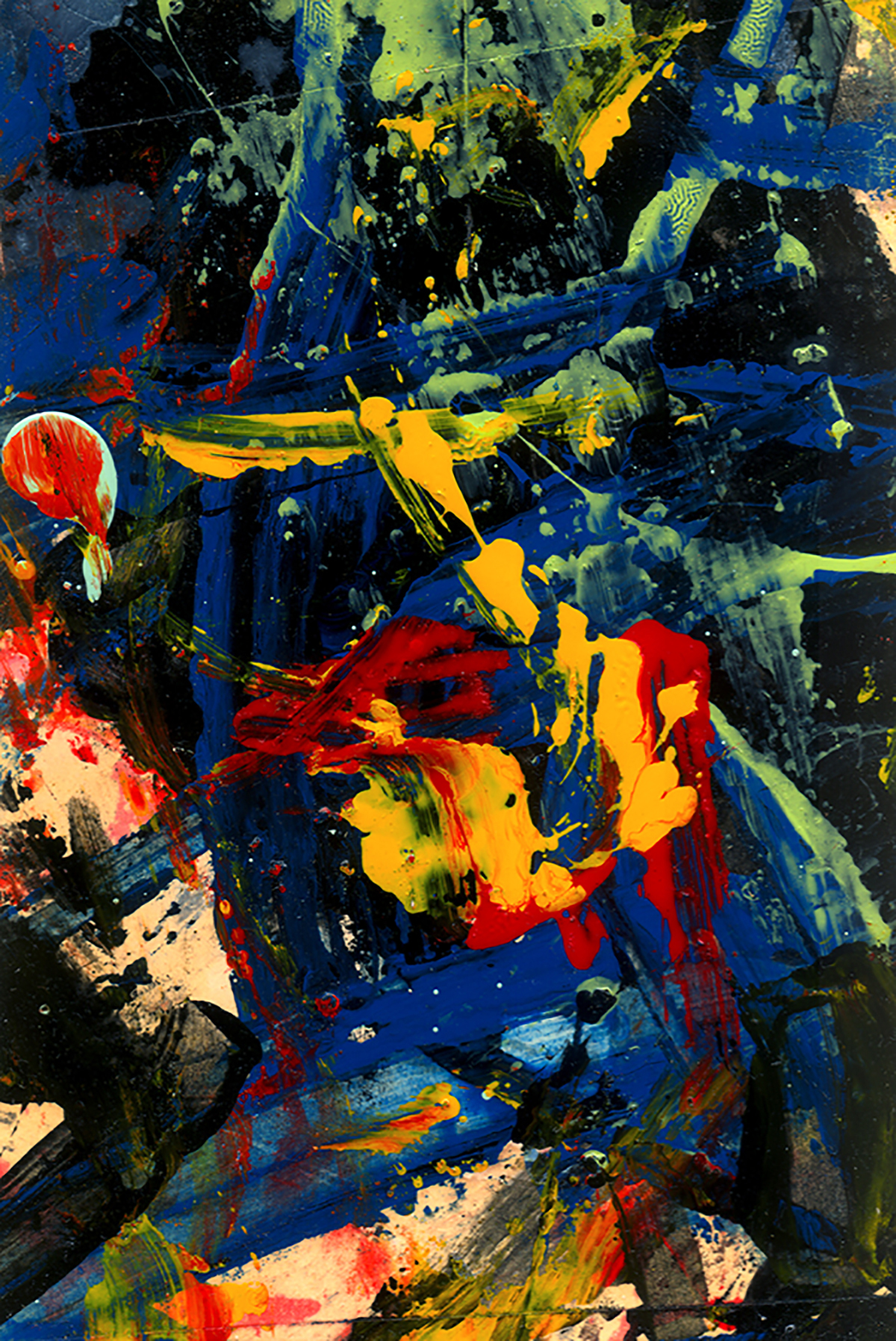
Abstract No. 25, or letting th brush danse (after a poem by bill bissett).

picking up
th brush bodee
breething pick up
kolour finding th
surface

–bill bissett
opening lines of:
letting th brush
danse
(For Abstract #25)

Hessay received minimal recognition for his paintings during his lifetime. When newspapers wrote articles on his exhibitions, they dwelt more on his person than the paintings on display.

In 1980, a retrospective of Hessay's life and art was held at the Langley Centennial Museum in Fort Langley, curated by Warren Sommer. It included photographs, watercolours, and oil paintings. Writing for the Vancouver Sun, Brenda White declared that "inside the exhibition space is the still ringing voice of a man who reached into his soul to understand the world he reached out to embrace", and for all their diversity, "the themes originate from the same deep well of emotion and restlessness".

His artworks were next exhibited in the Grain Elevator Gallery in Dawson Creek in 1984, a month-long exhibition. The Toronto art critic Jennifer Oille, while regarding skeptically the events of Hessay's life, described the works as ranging from objective landscape to mindscapes and expressionist symbols.

In 2005, Leonard Woods authored a slim coffee-table book, Meditations on the Paintings of Carle Hessay (Trabarni, 2005), an exploration of the thematic content of the artist's paintings.

Four paintings of Hessay's The Hollow World series appeared in public for the first time, in 2009 at the juried exhibition, Universe Inspired Art by Canadian Artists, sponsored by the NRC Herzberg Institute of Astrophysics. The scenes were accompanied by poems from bill bissett, Leonard A. Woods, and Terence Young.

The 2014 book, For Kelly, with Love: Poems on the Abstracts of Carle Hessay (Treeline Press), arranged and edited by Maidie Hilmo, commemorated an unusual project in homage of Kelly Parsons, a Victoria poet and medievalist, who died of breast cancer in 2008. Sixteen Canadian poets were invited to finish a project contemplated by Parsons, but never begun due to her declining health, by each writing one or more poems inspired by Hessay's small abstracts. The collaborative effort included poets such as bill bissett, Patrick Friesen, Linda Rogers, and Patricia Young, among others. In her contribution, Dorothy Field links how Hessay applied "black ink like tar", to Parsons' use of her hands in making arts and crafts, both "undamming the heart". Several poets felt a kinship between writing poems and painting. The abstracts spun a variety of responses: divination of personal relationships, glimpsed mythical forces, expressions of mirth, even Oscar Wilde. The book launch, at the Templed Mind Gallery in Victoria, featured the authors reading their poems, and concluded with a talk on Kelly Parsons by Kathryn Kerby-Fulton, a medieval scholar who knew Parsons well.

Arleen Paré wrote two poems, She Asked For Birds, and City Slants, after a pair of untitled paintings by Hessay. They appeared in her 2015 book, He Leaves His Face in the Funeral Car (Caitlin Press).

A documentary film about Hessay, directed by Guochen Wang, screened at the University of Victoria in 2017, in conjunction with an exhibit displaying some of Hessay's futurist views, renditions of the Spanish Civil War, and wilderness landscapes. The film, narrated by Linda Rogers, consists of interviews with twelve people who either knew the artist personally, or were familiar with his work. It closes with bisset's performance of his poem letting th brush dance, which reimagines Hessay's process of creating an action painting.

Hessay's works are represented in the collections of the Langley Centennial Museum and the Penticton Art Gallery. His 1968 painting Port City was depicted on the cover of the book Late Modernism and Expatriation, edited by Lauren Arrington, and published in 2022 by Clemson University Press in association with Liverpool University Press. Paintings by Hessay have appeared in literary and political journals, including the Boston Review, the Paris Review, and the revived Quarterly Review.

== Exhibitions of paintings ==
- Village Art Centre – West Vancouver, 25 February to 13 March 1965
- Buchanan Gallery – Vancouver, Oct–Nov 1966.
- Richmond Arts Centre – Richmond, Sep–Oct 1969. Sixty piece exhibition.
- Stanley Park – Vancouver, annual exhibitions, until at least 1971
- Mind and Matter Gallery (Arnold Mikelson, owner) – White Rock, 1971, 1979
- C Hessay: Signs and Posters, Surrey Centennial Arts Centre – Surrey, 19 June to 8 July 1972
- New Westminster Art Gallery – New Westminster, 11 to 16 September 1972
- Heritage House Gallery – Langley, 12–20 October 1973
- Langley Arts Centre – Langley, 7–8 May 1977
- Station Art Centre – White Rock, 30 July to 2 August 1977
- Langley Centennial Museum – Fort Langley, June 1980
- Dawson Creek Grain Elevator Gallery – Dawson Creek, May 1984
- Templed Mind Gallery – Victoria, March 2014
- Audain Gallery, University of Victoria – Victoria, 14 to 17 May 2017
- Langley Community Music School – Langley, 25 November 2023

== Gallery ==
=== Landscapes ===
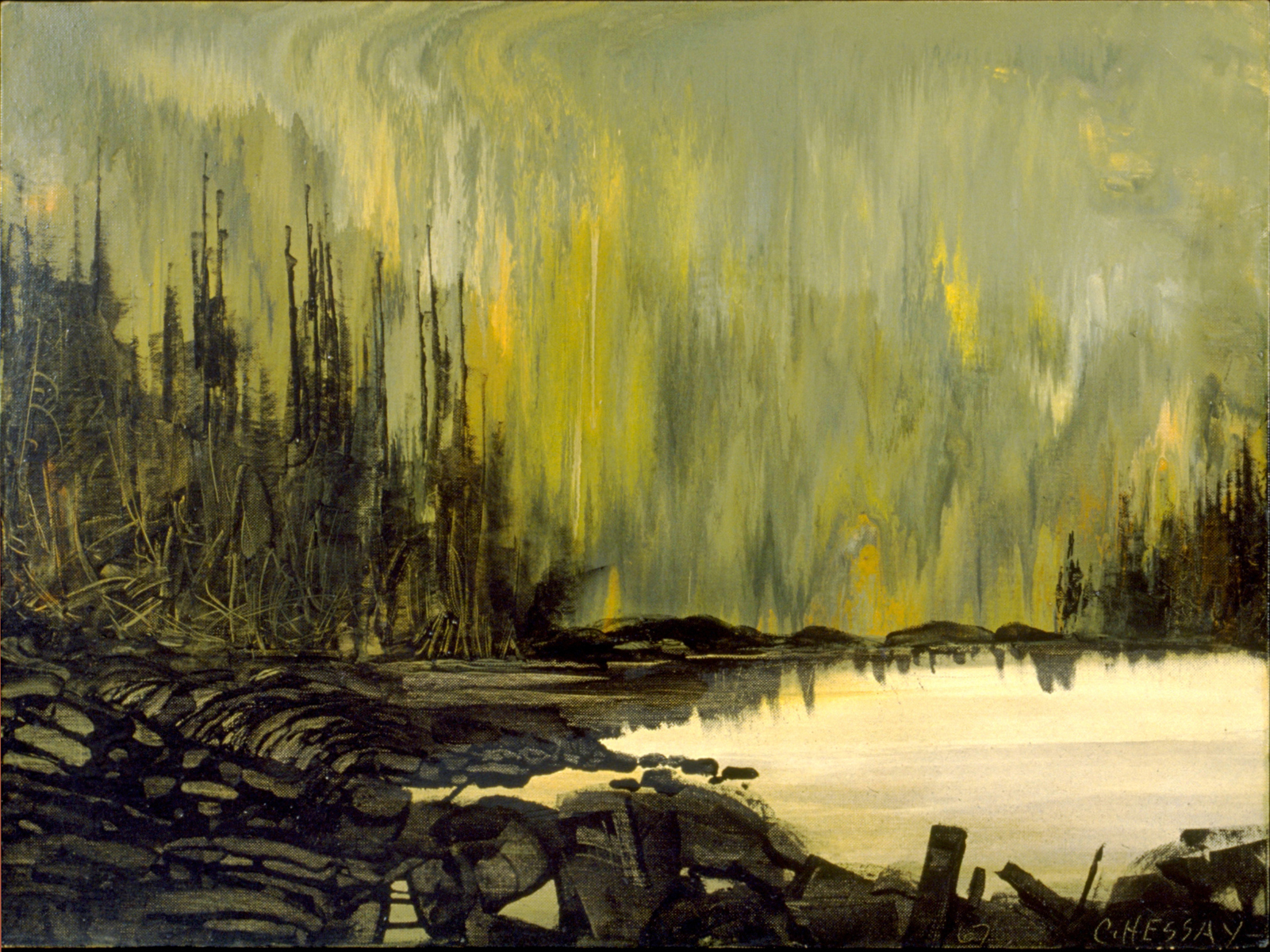
(West Coast) Rain Forest. 1967.

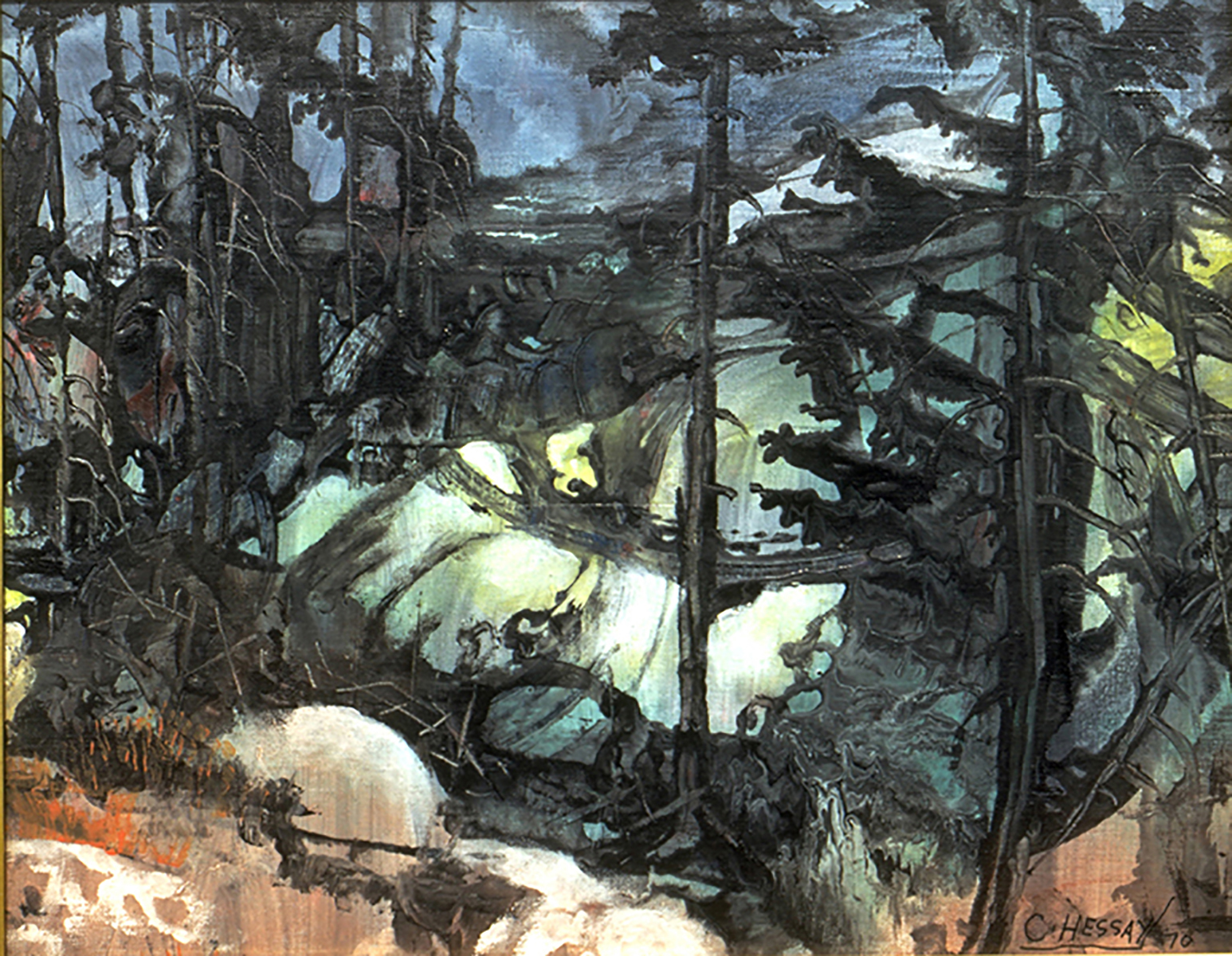
Above the Yalakom. 1970.

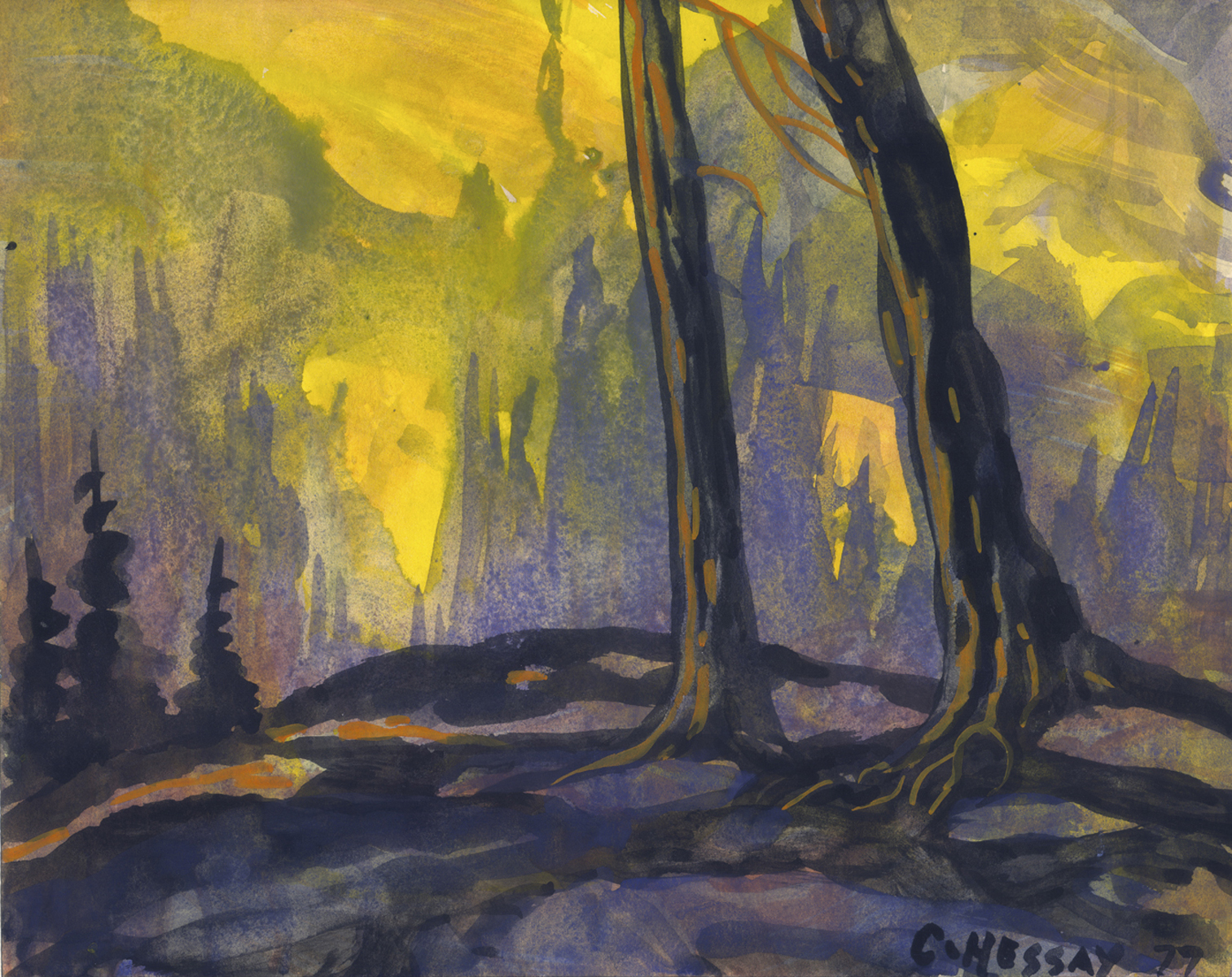
Lords of the Golden Forest.
1977. Watercolour.

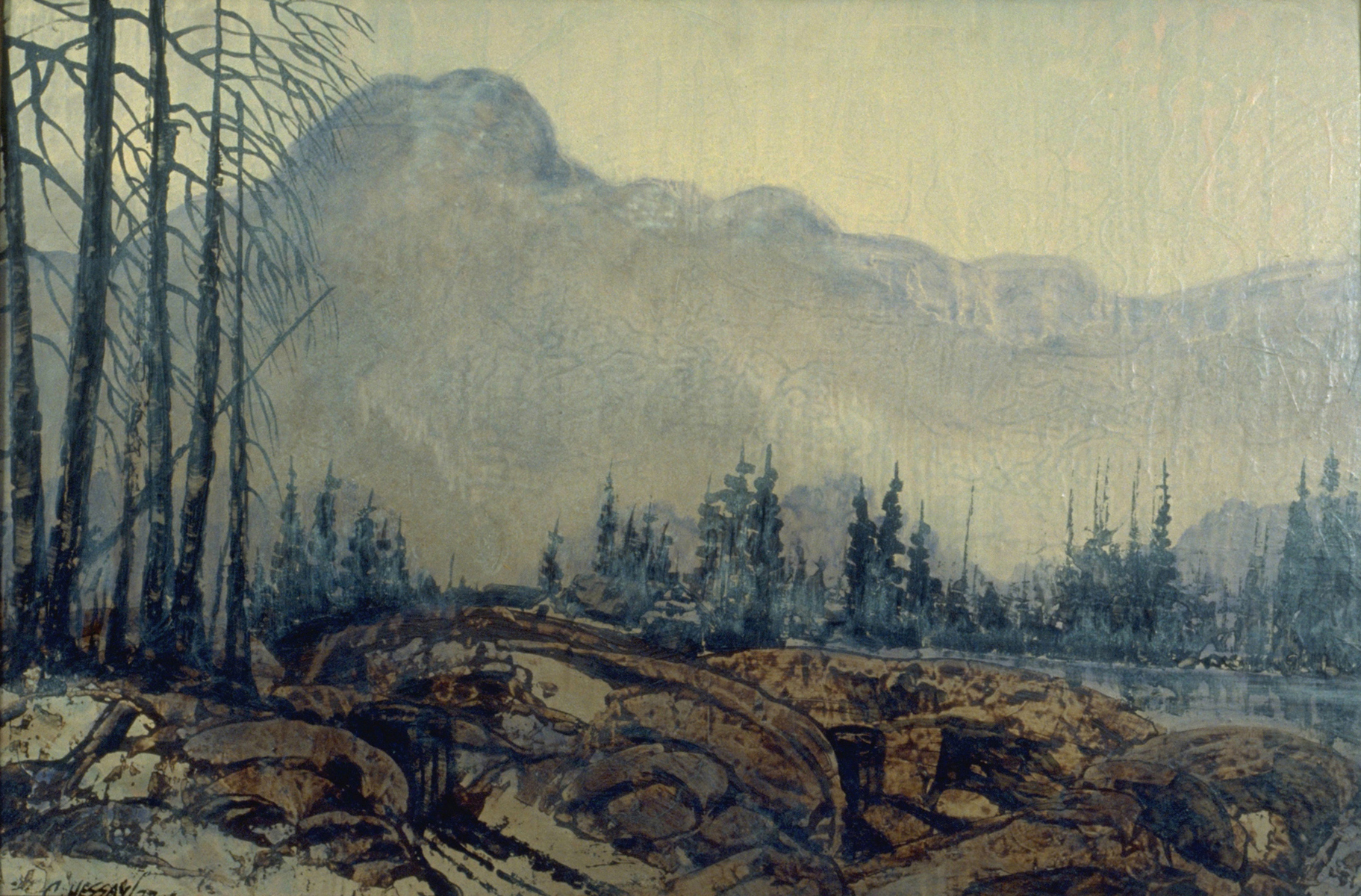
Break of Day. 1977.

=== Abstracts ===
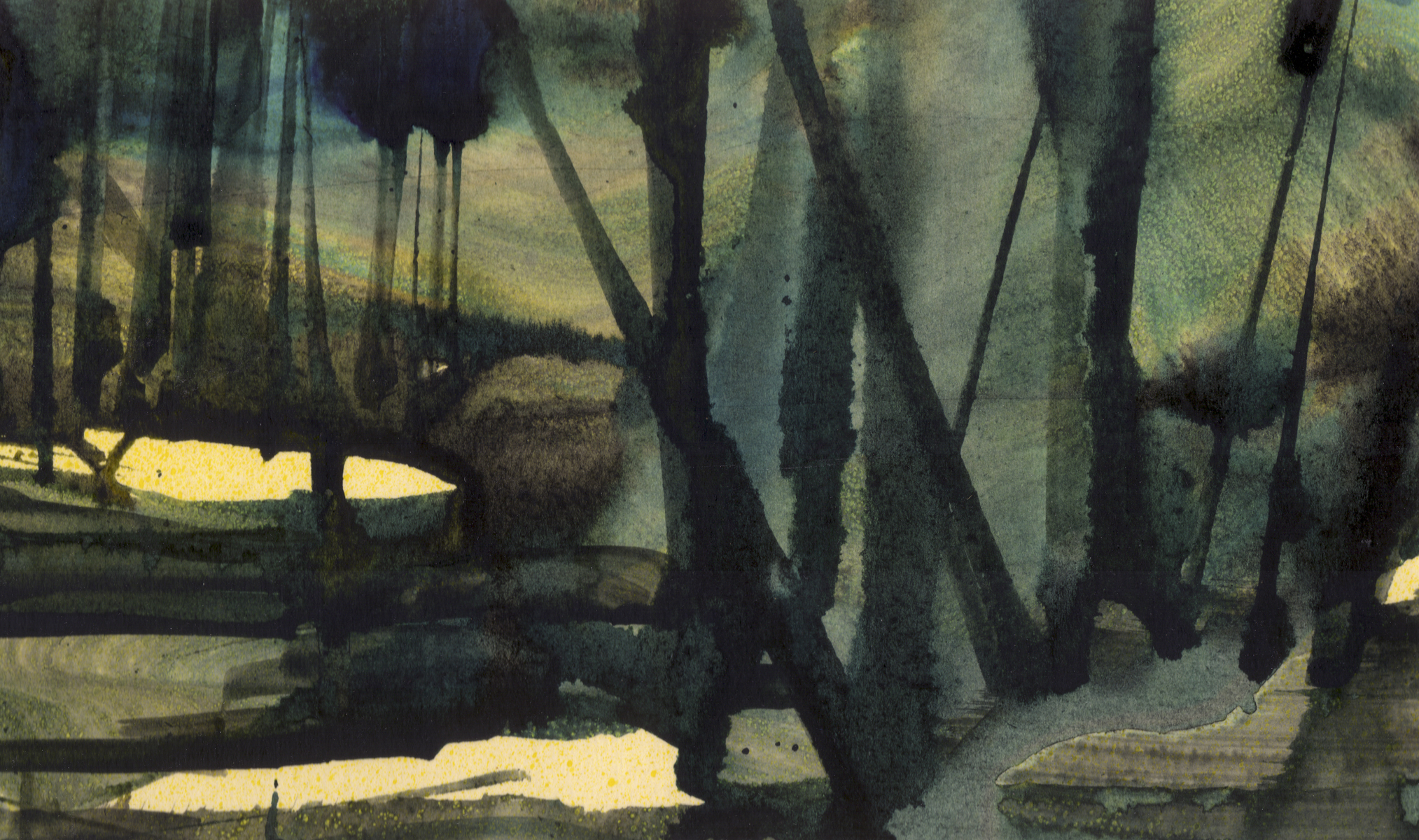
Abstract No. 231, or Cathedral Grove (after a poem by Barbara Colebrook Peace). Watercolour.

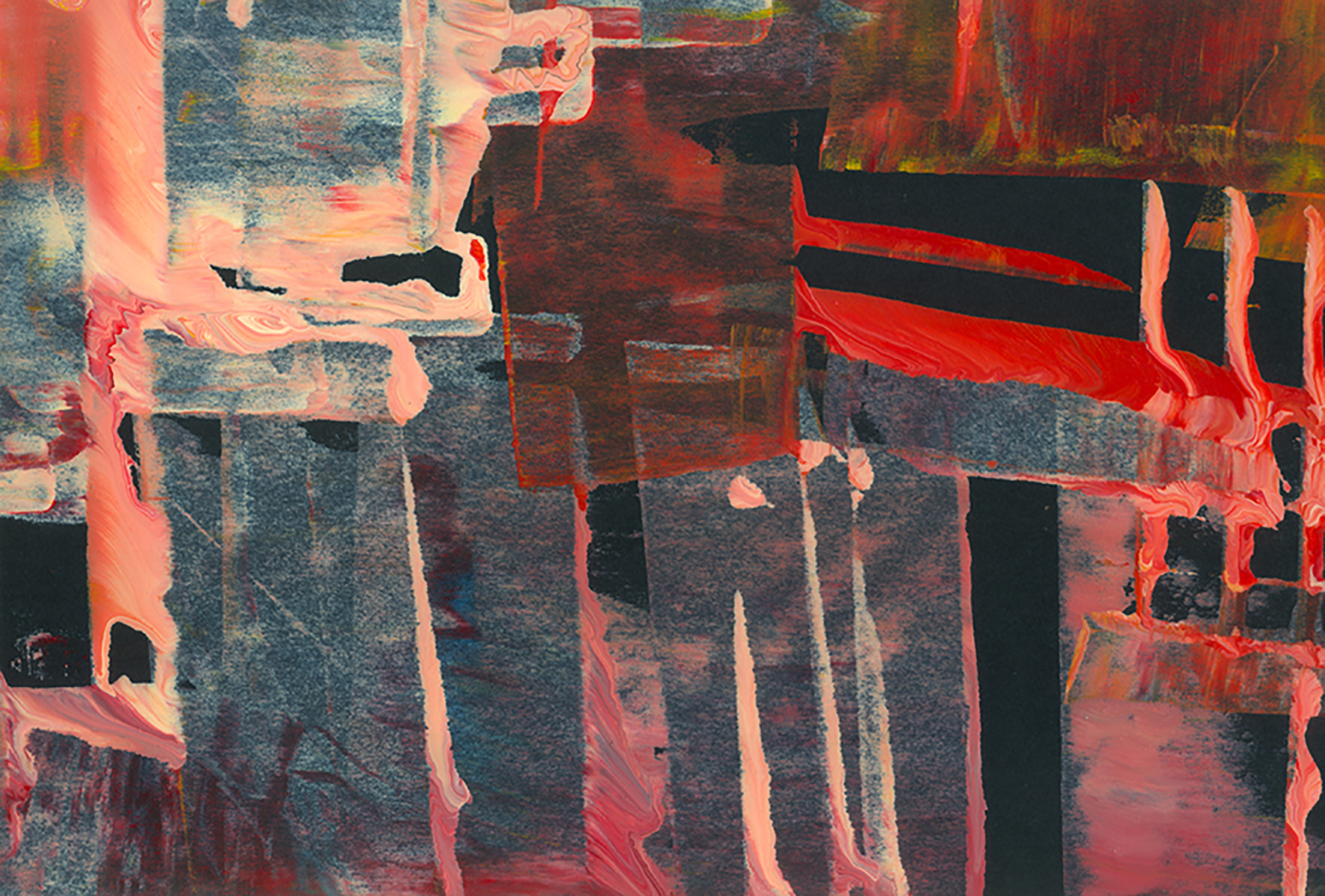
Abstract No. 60, or Life Drawing (after a poem by Eve Joseph).

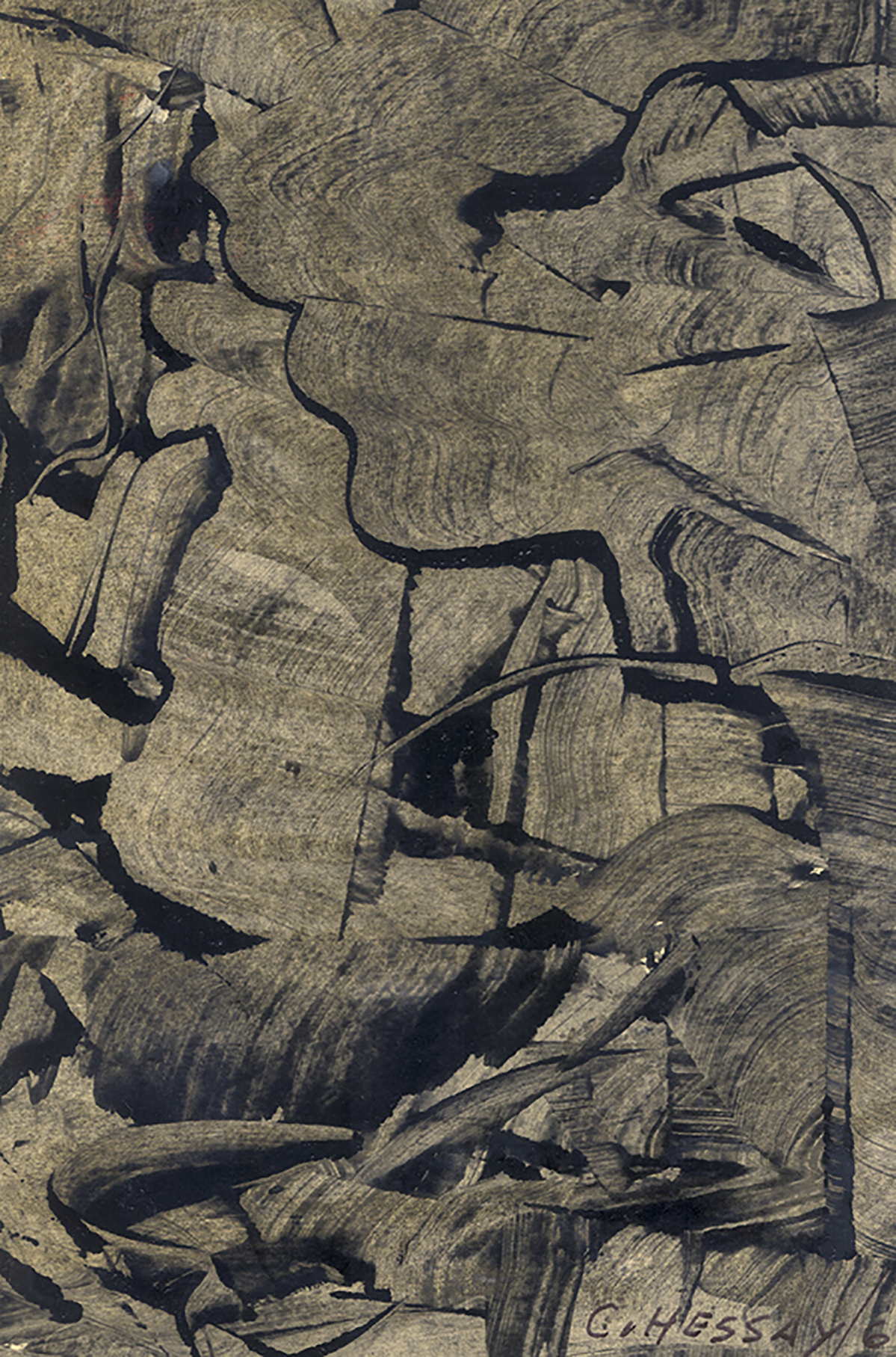
Abstract No. 229, or Igneus (after a poem by Patricia Young).

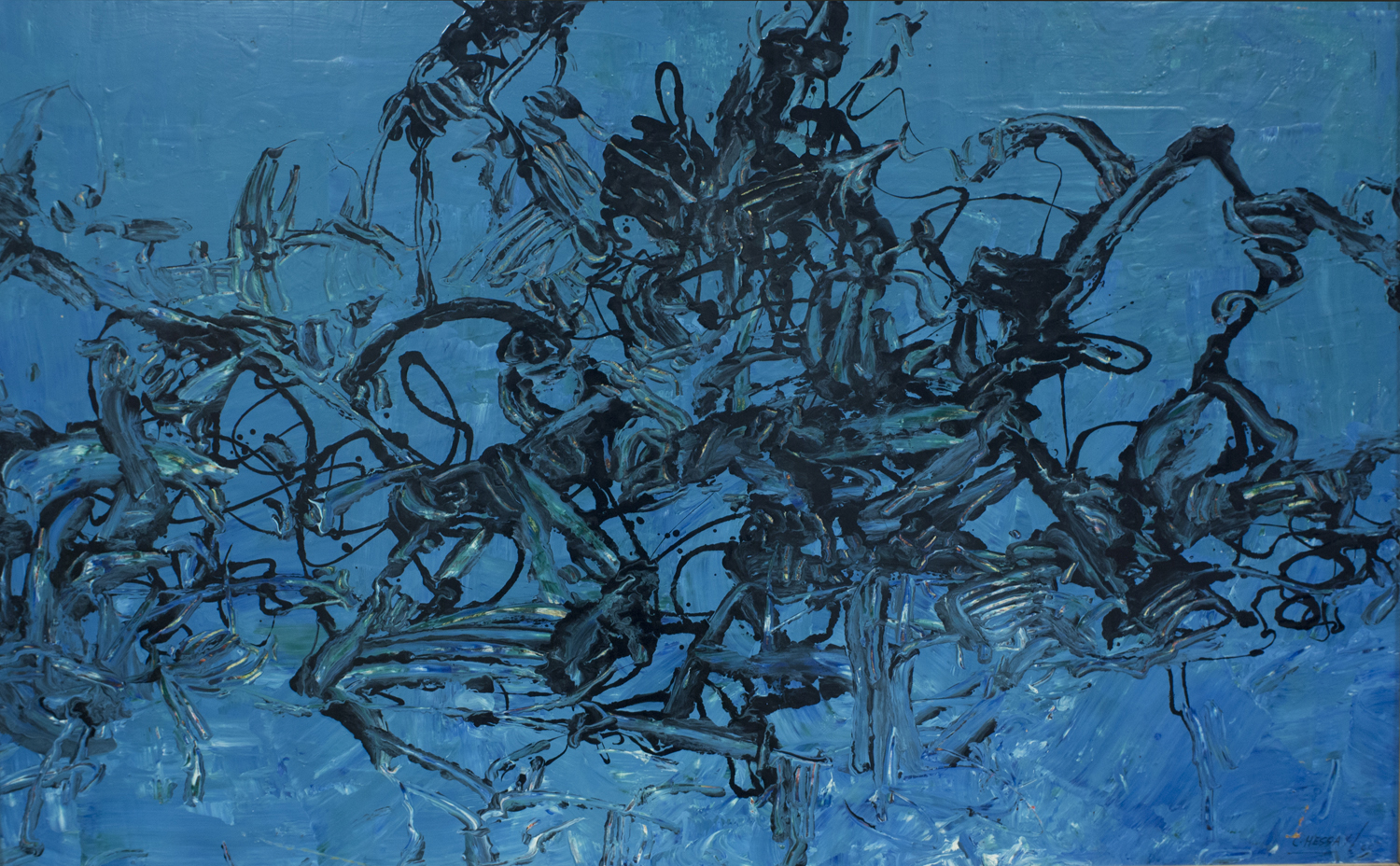
Contrivance Naturelle, or Image for Skindivers. 1966.

=== Cabins to Cities series ===
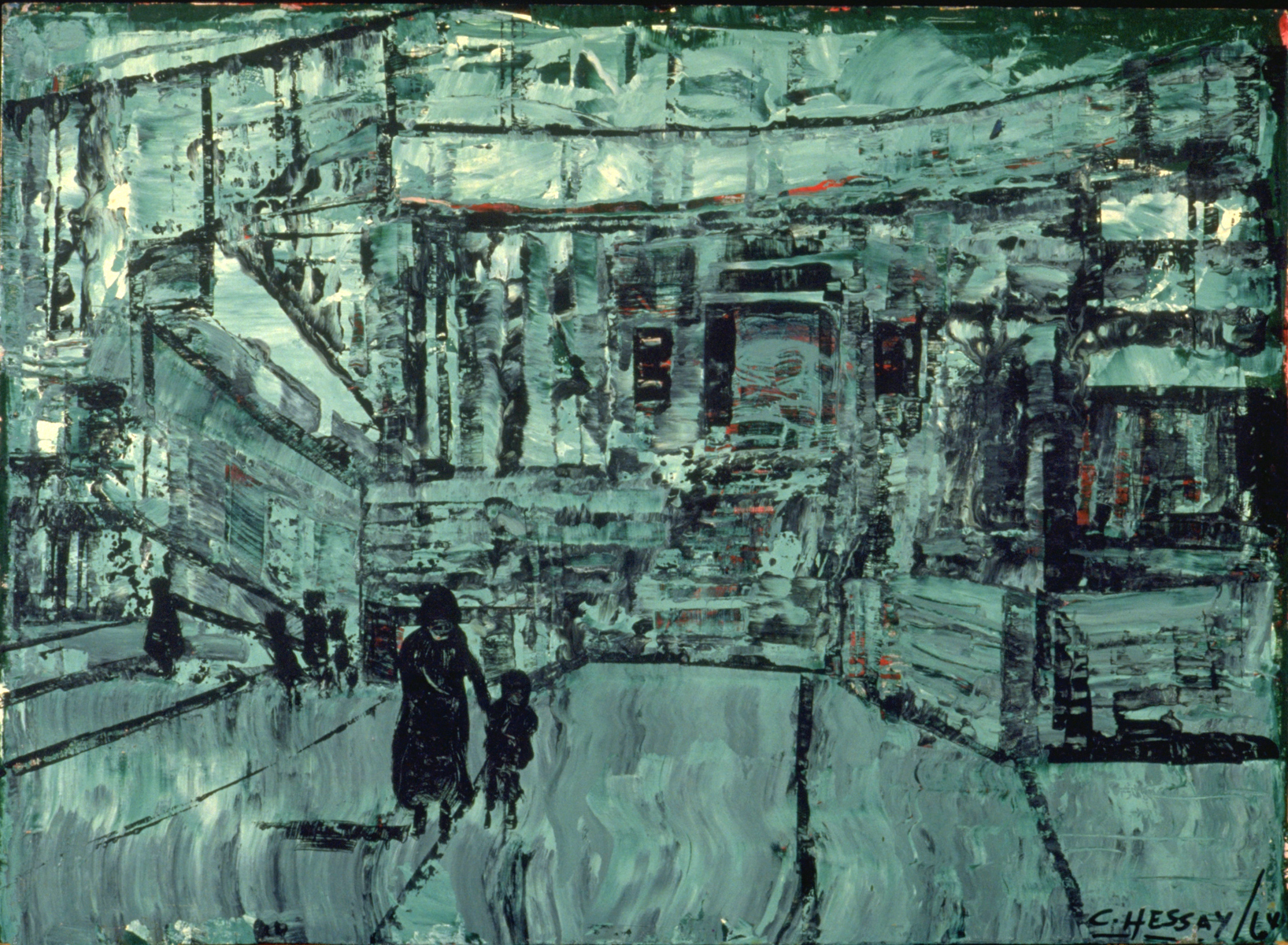
Immigrant Mother and Child. 1964.

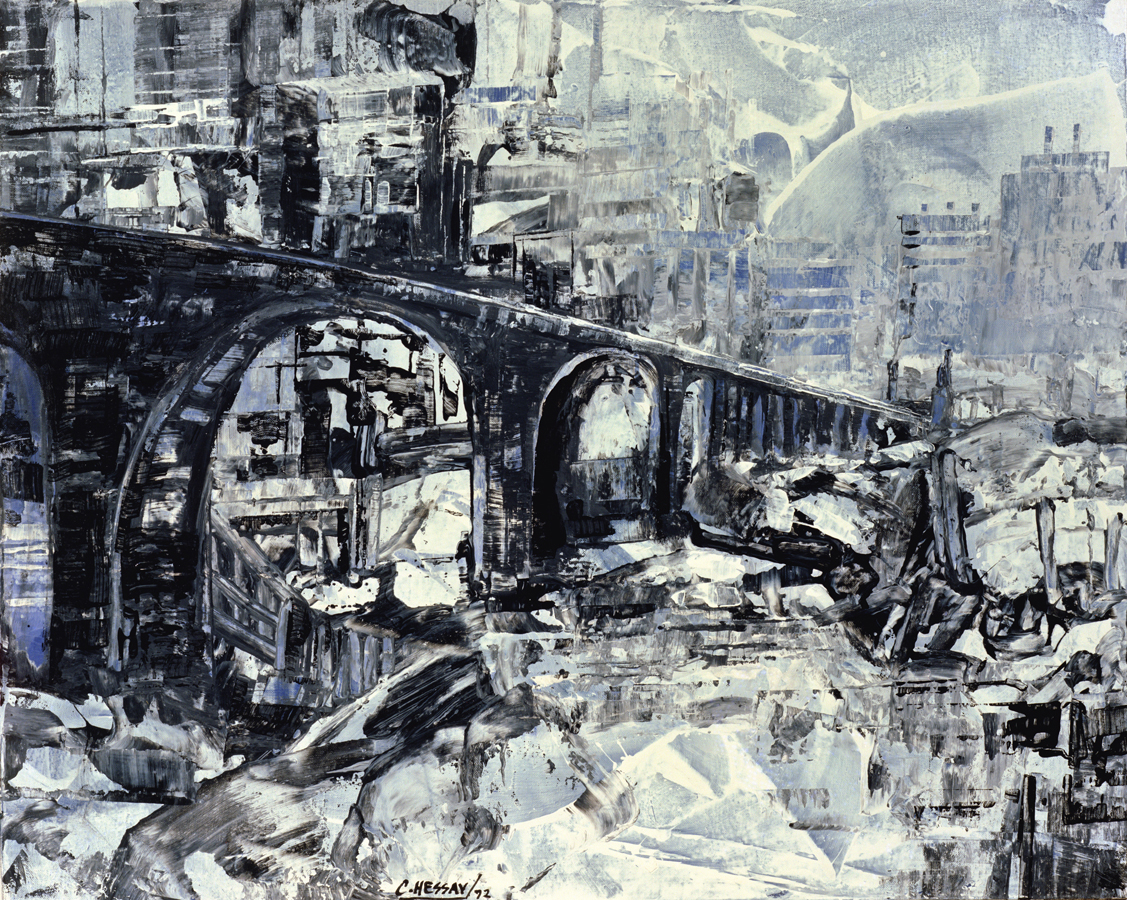
The Great City. 1972.

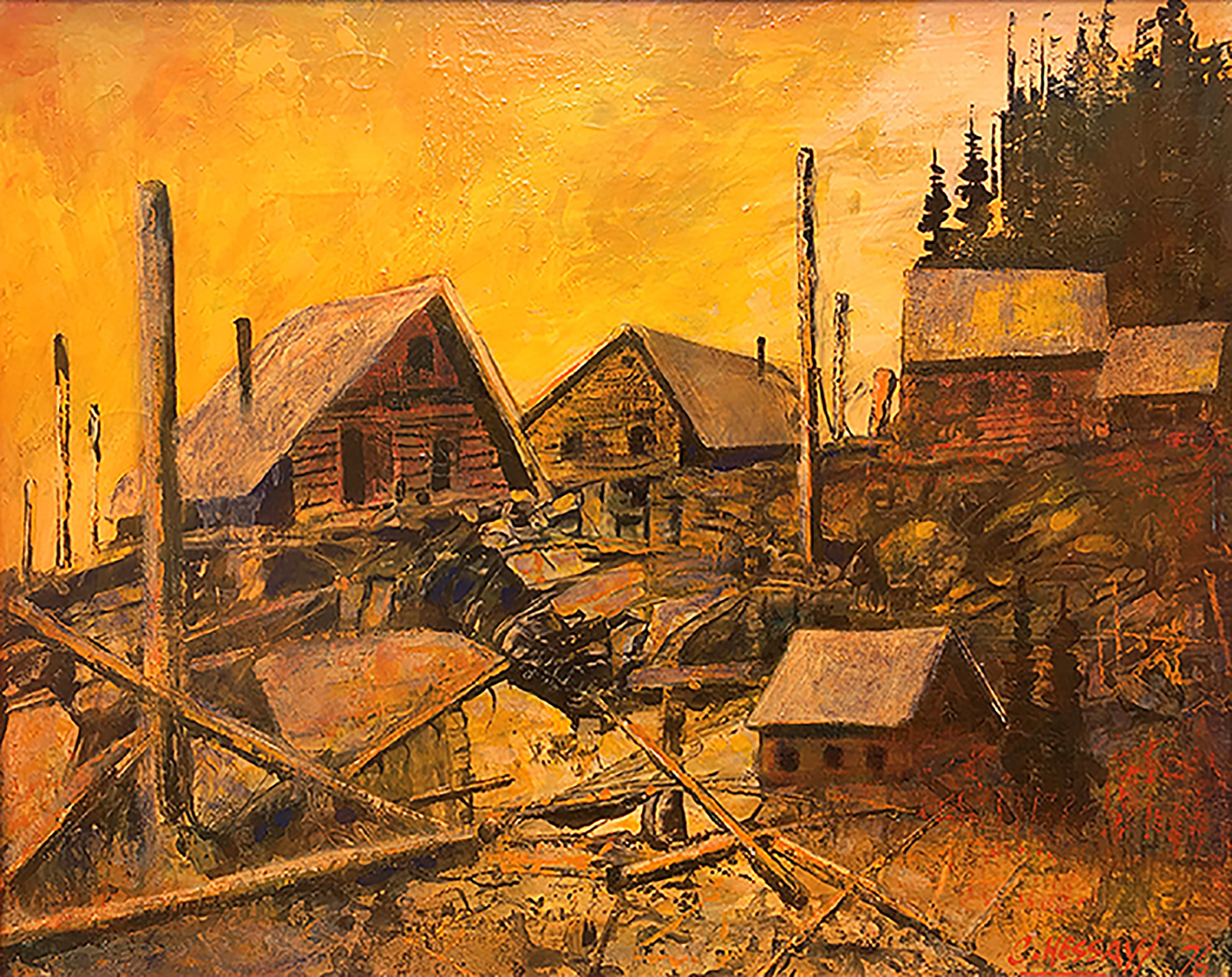
Abandoned Village. 1976.

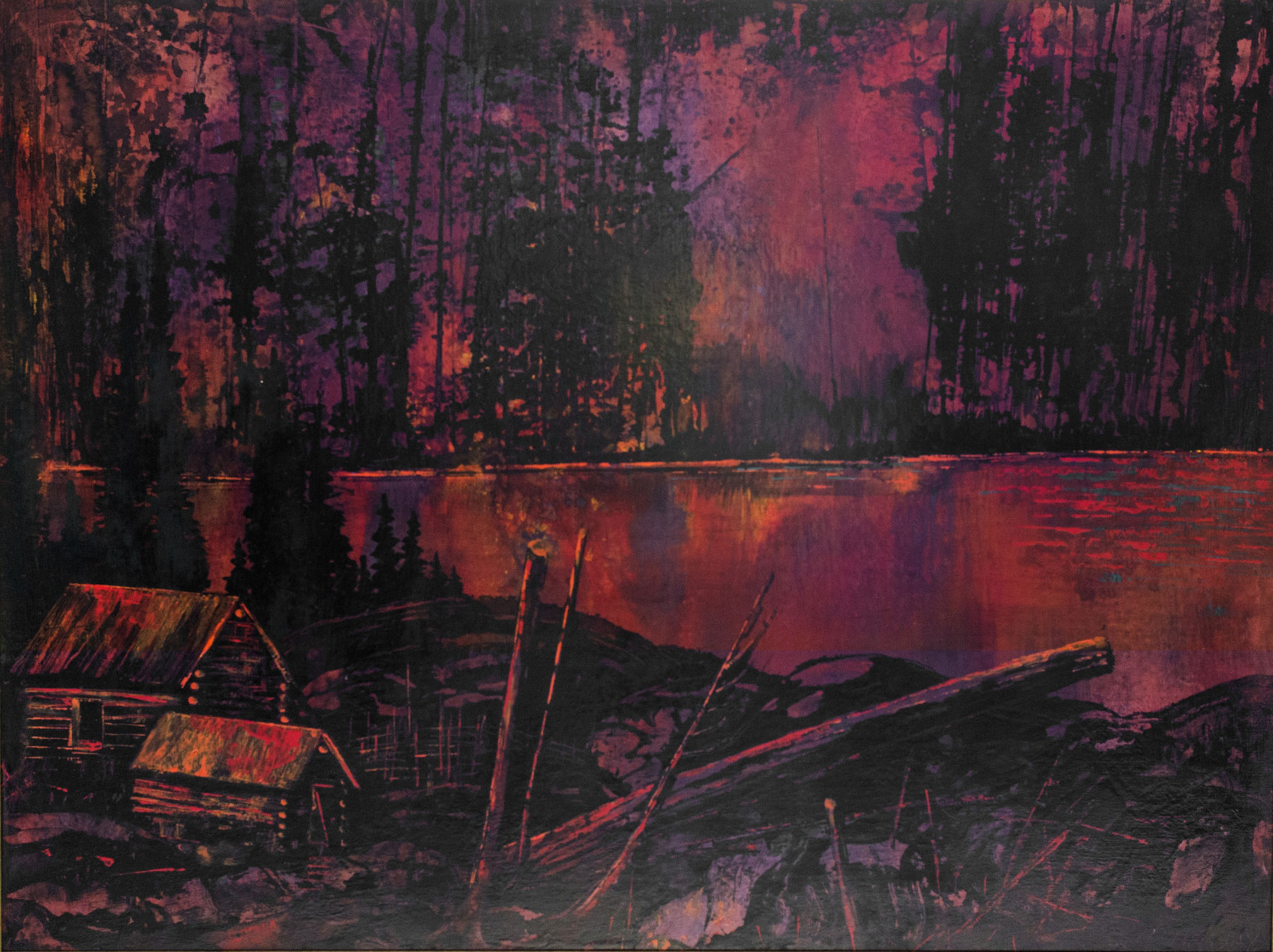
Magenta Fire. 1977.

=== The Hollow World series ===
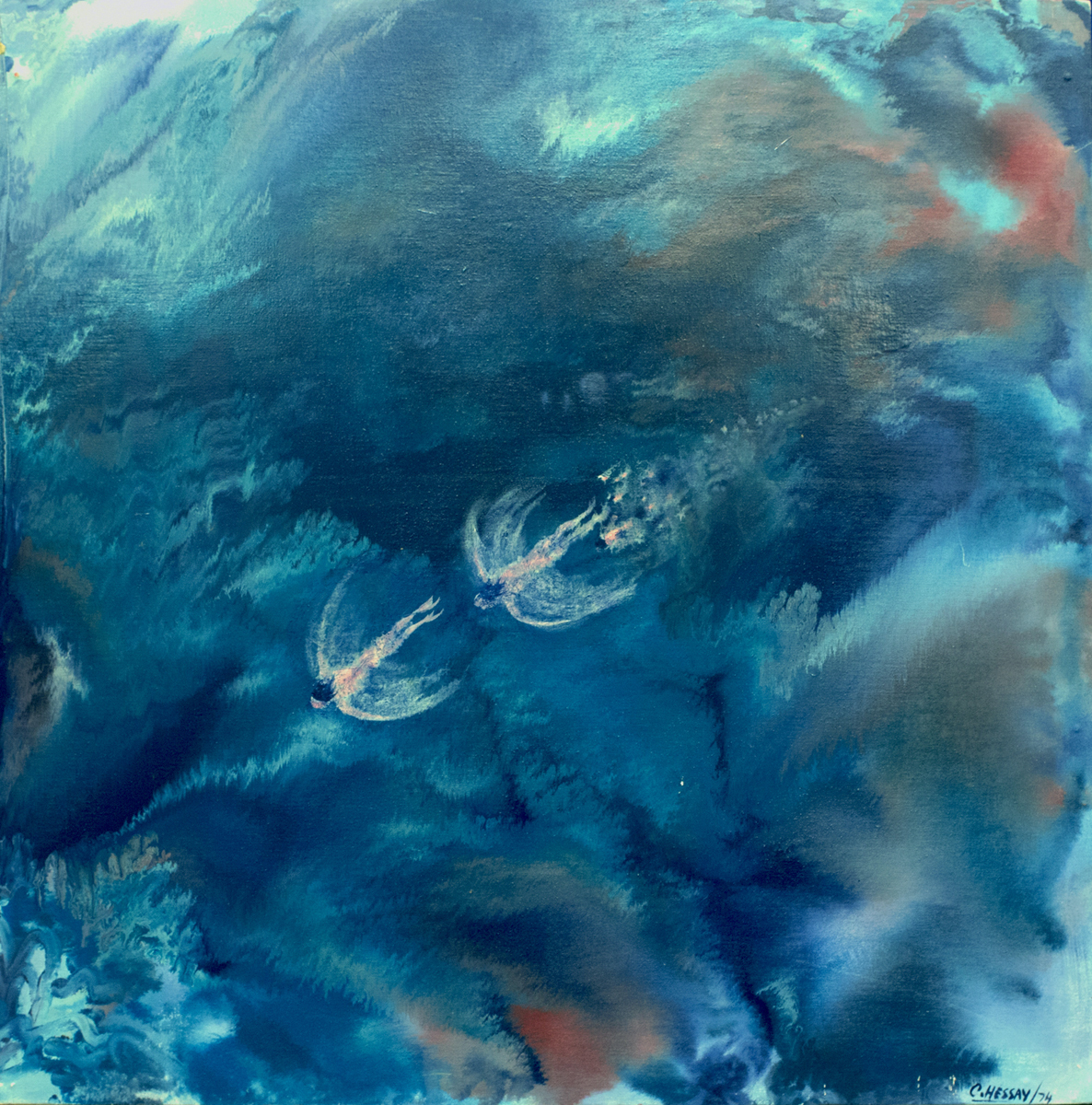
Image of the Hollow World. 1974.

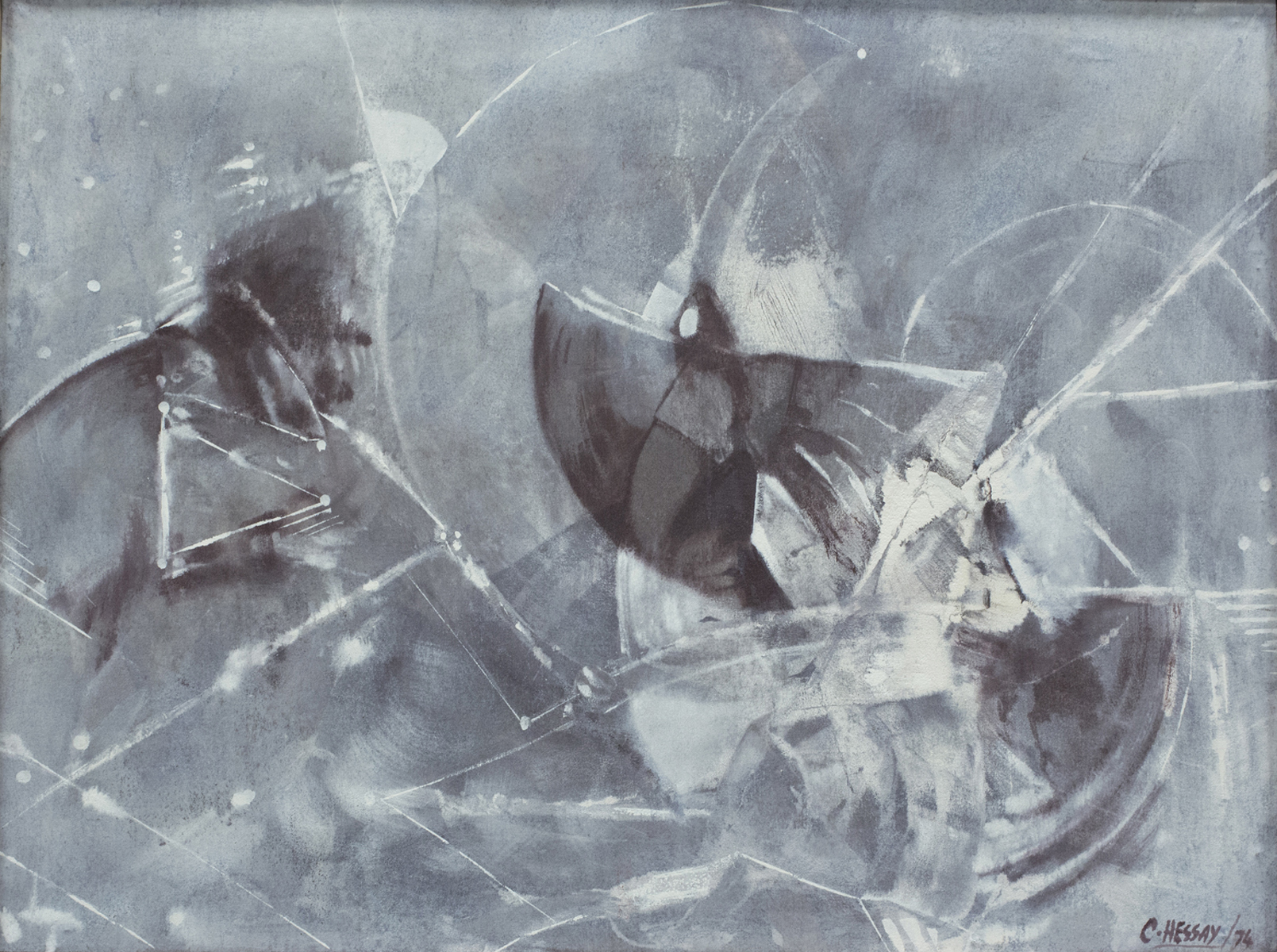
Ancient Mariner of the Space Age. 1974.

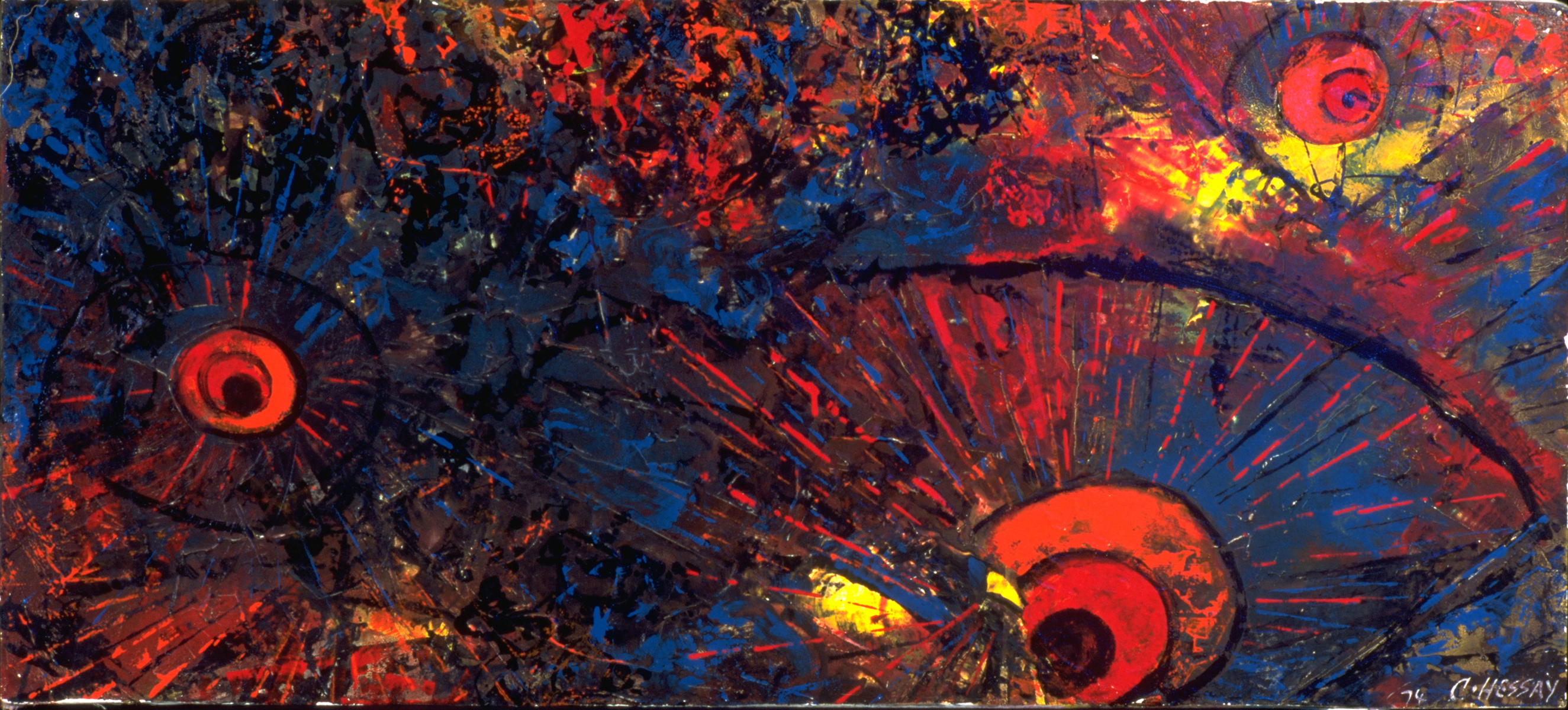
There Shall Be Sound. 1974.

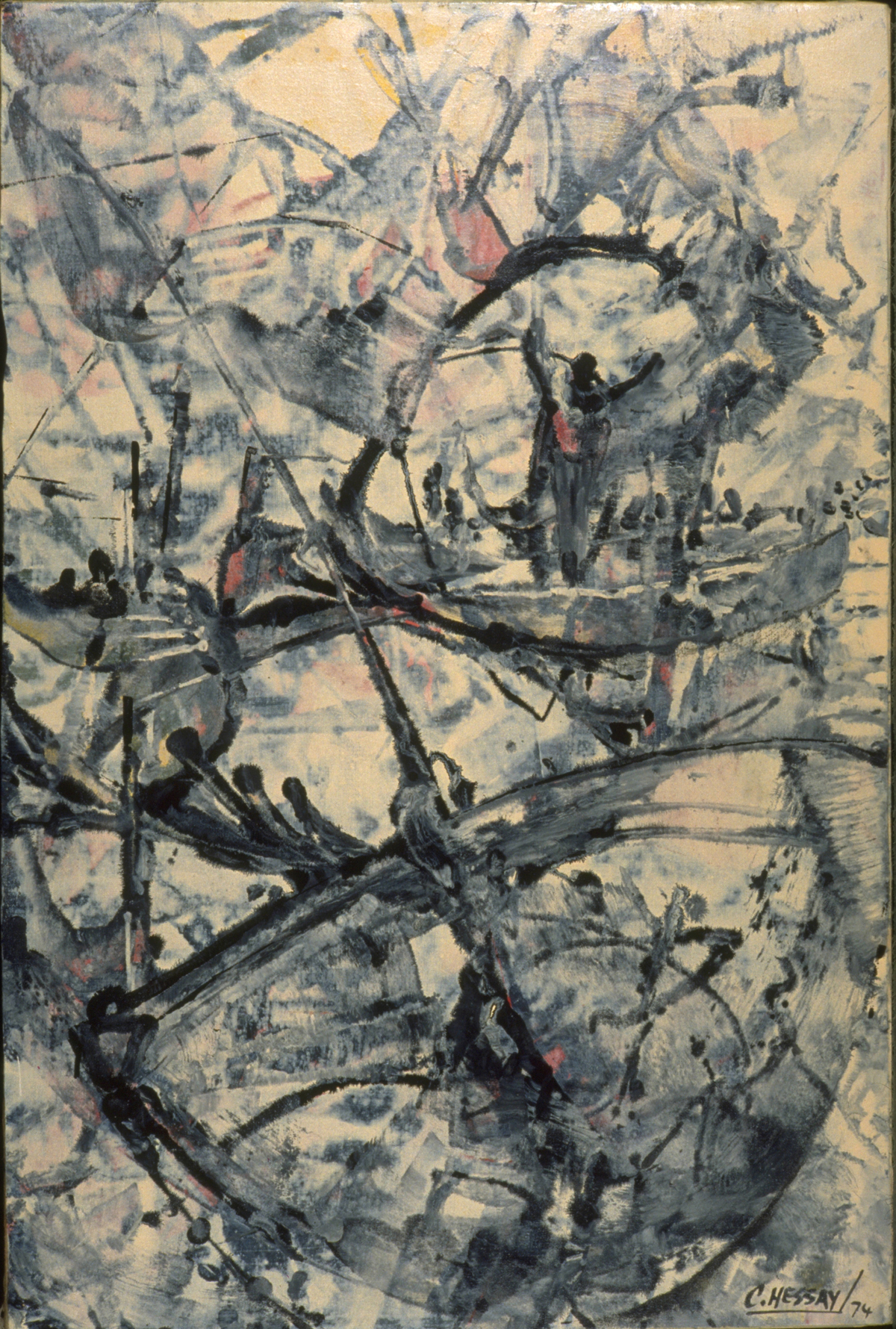
The Builders. 1974.

=== The Spanish Civil War and Biblical prophecy ===
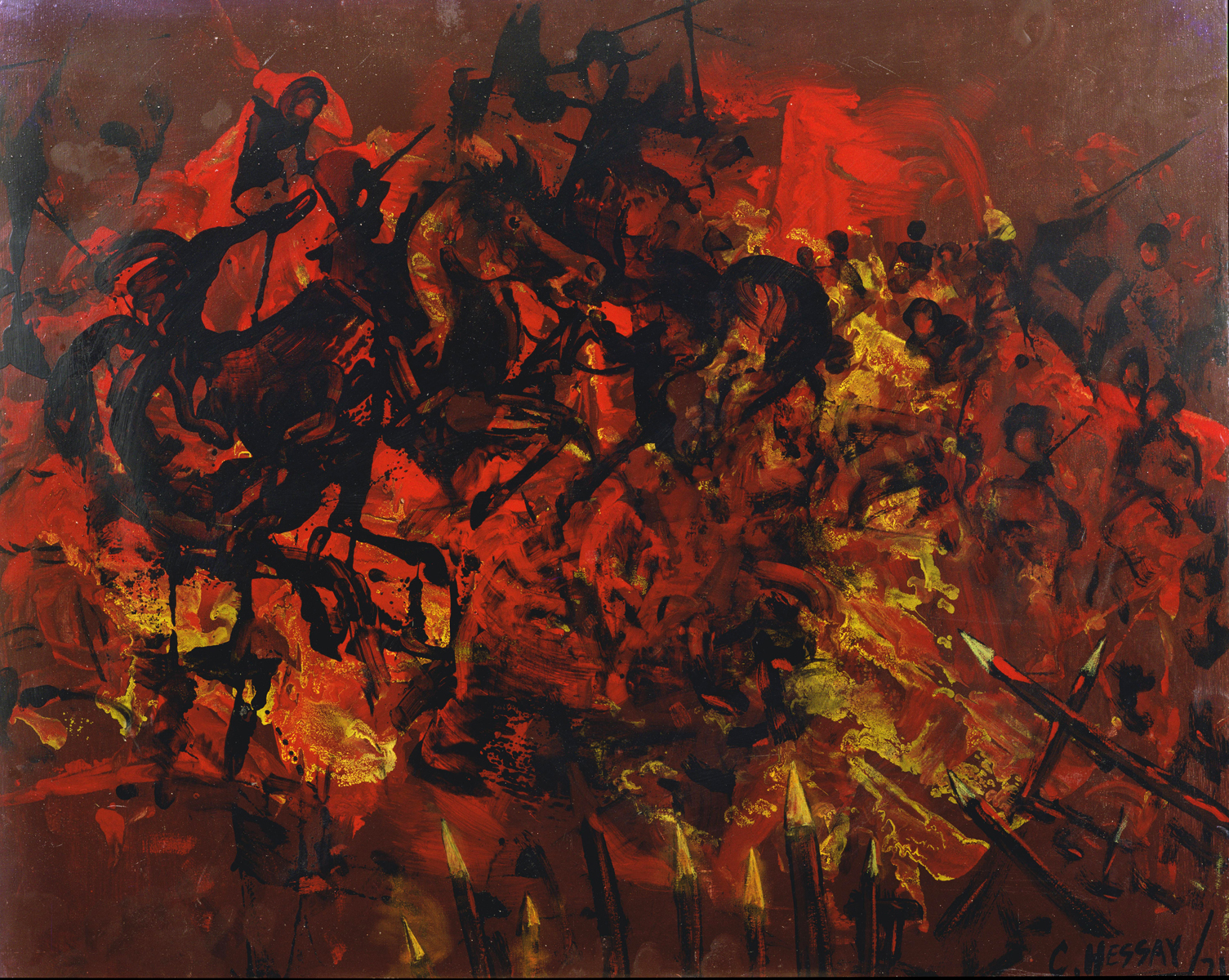
The Dark Riders. 1971.

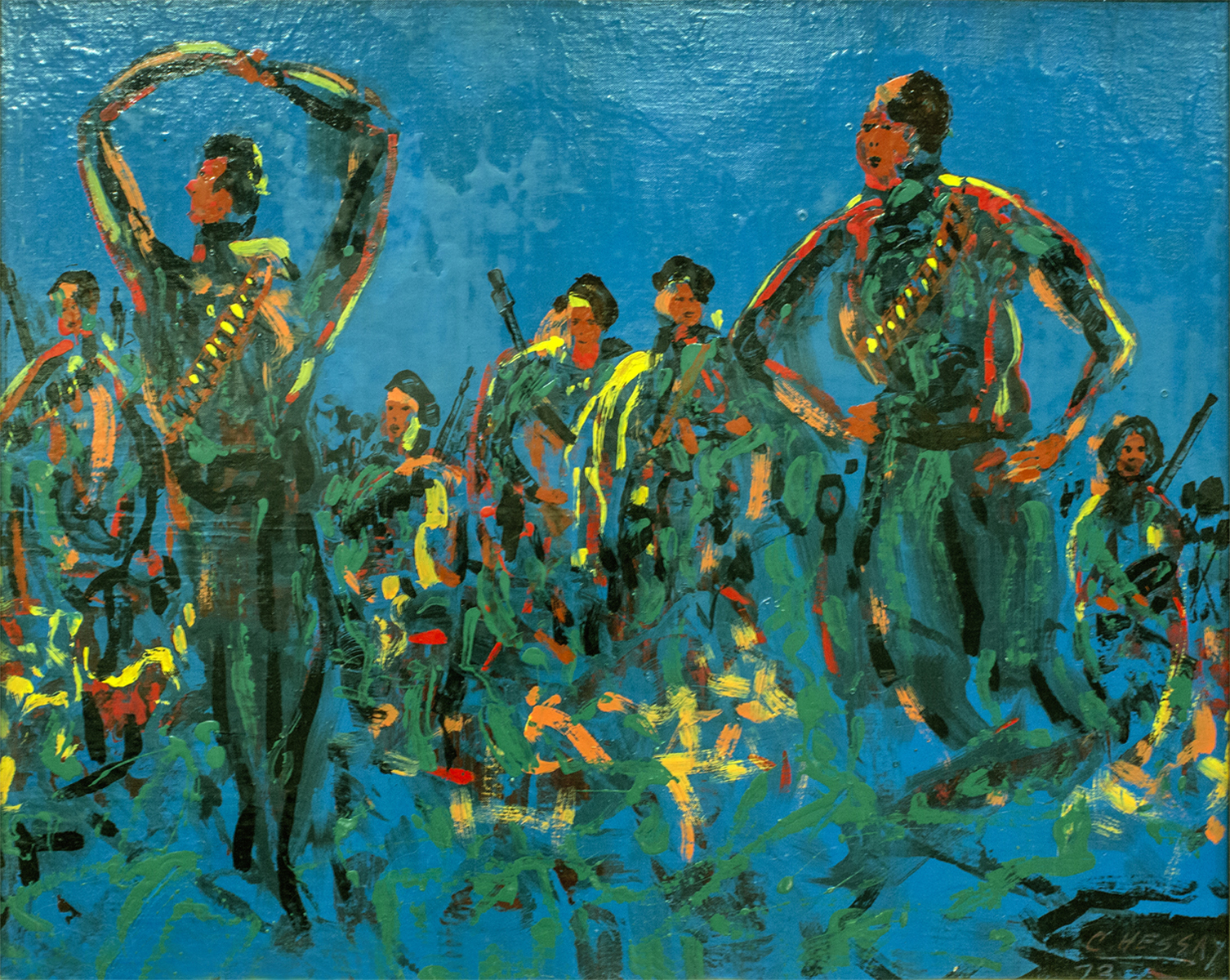
The Showoff (Pedro Ajala).
1973.

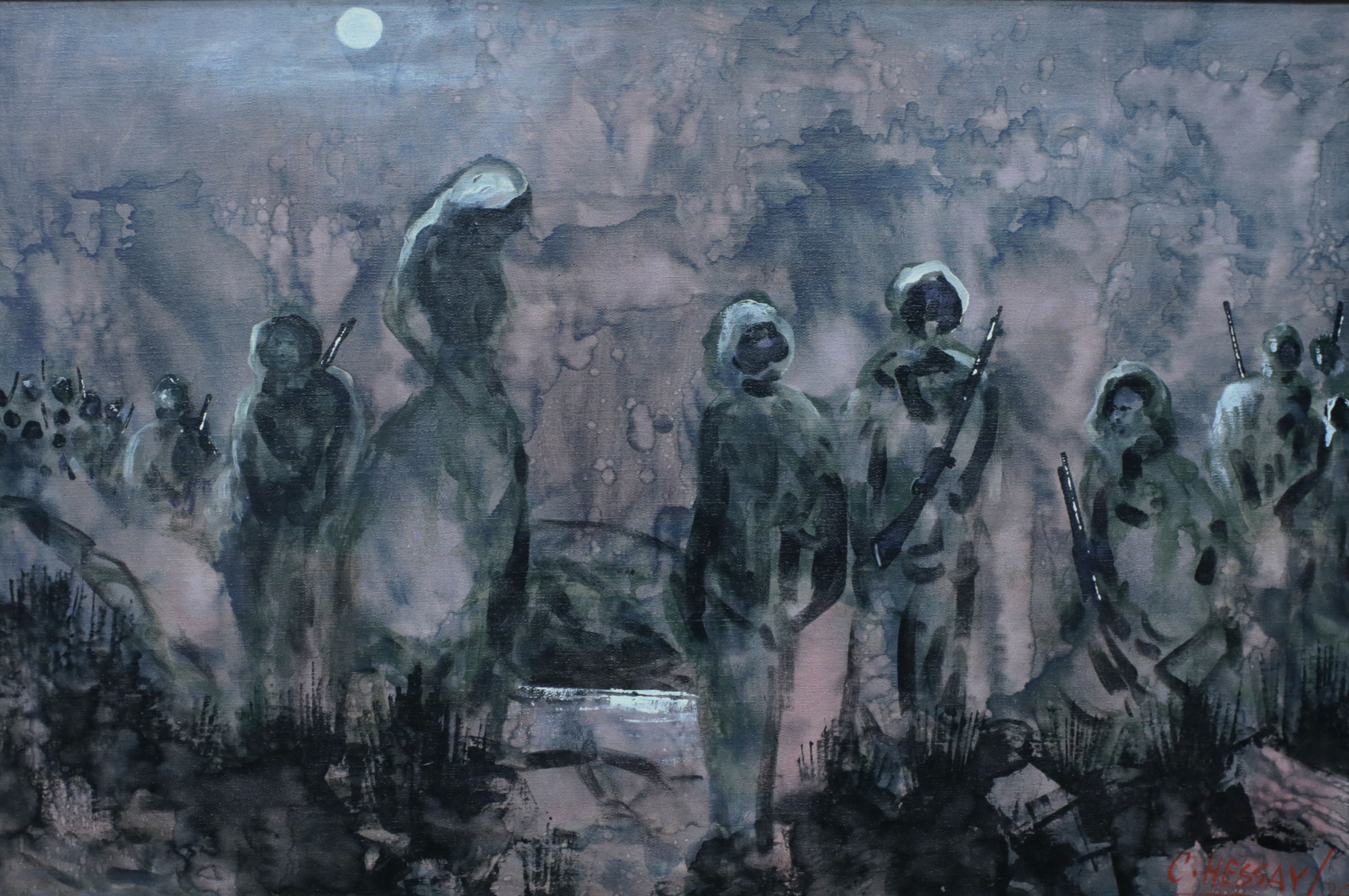
La Pasionaria (Dolores Ibárruri)
at the Jarama River. 1976.

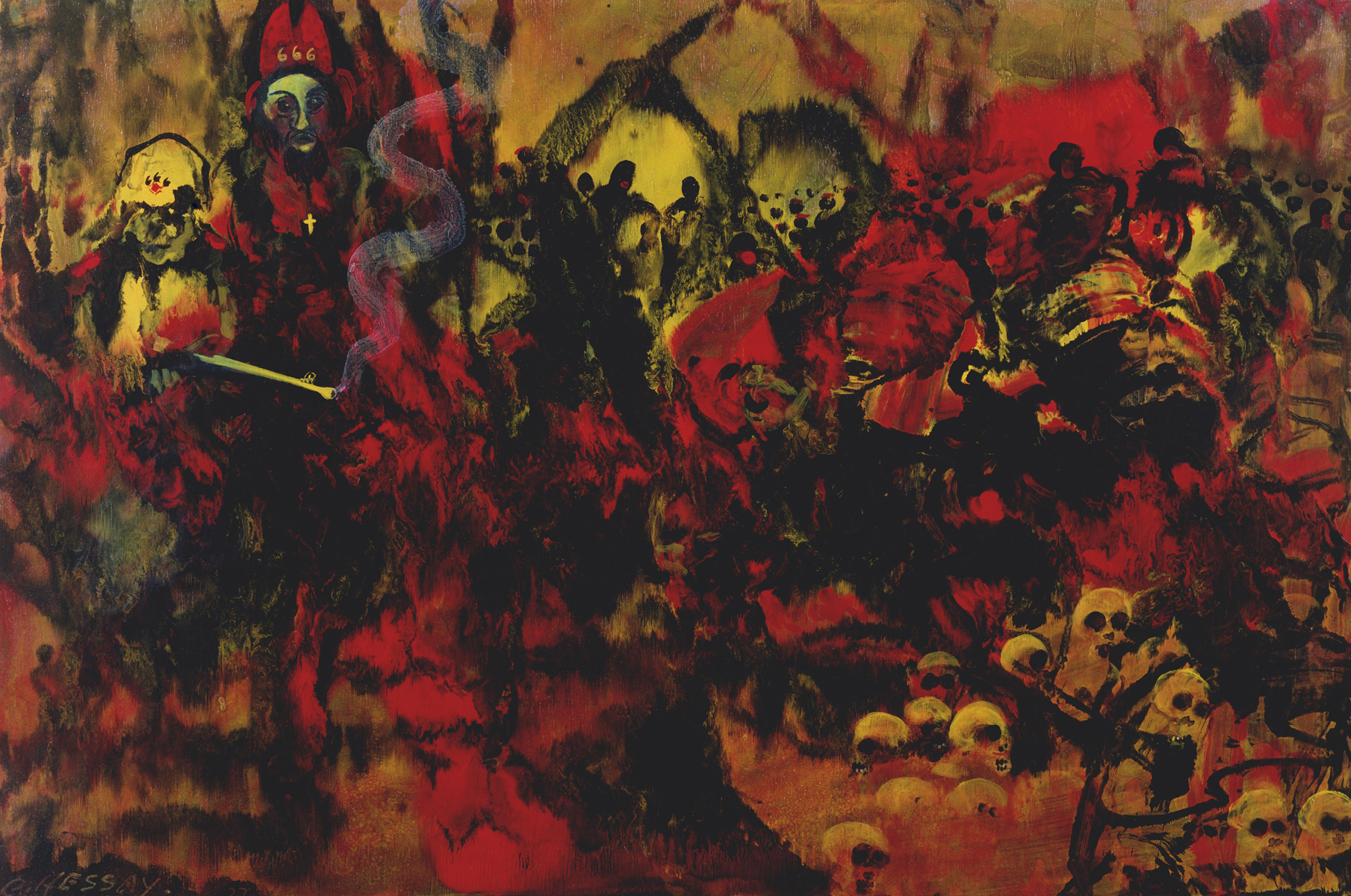
The Number of Man. 1977.

== Sources ==
- Anderson, Brenda (22 December 2006). "Inspired by nature". Langley Times. Langley, British Columbia. ProQuest 372996044.
- "Artist died on trip at Spuzzum". Langley Advance. Langley, British Columbia. 4 January 1978. Archived from the original on 29 November 2019 – via Newspapers.com.
- "Artist to Show". The Surrey Leader. Surrey, British Columbia. 30 September 1971. p. 16. Archived from the original on 6 December 2019 – via Newspapers.com.
- "Art of Carle Hessay to Be Exhibited at Langley". Hope Standard. 4 June 1980. p. 3. Archived from the original on 27 July 2019 – via Newspapers.com.
- "Buchanan Gallery Exhibits Hessay". Jewish Western Bulletin. 4 November 1966. p. 11 – via SFU Digitized Newspapers.
- "Carle Hessay Exhibition". Langley Advance. 12 November 1980. p. 14. Archived from the original on 10 August 2019 – via Newspapers.com.
- "Carle Hessay has painted for 51 years". Langley Advance. Langley, British Columbia. 27 April 1977. Archived from the original on 27 July 2019 – via Newspapers.com.
- "Carle Hessay held show of art work". Langley Advance. Langley, British Columbia. 18 October 1973. Archived from the original on 27 July 2019 – via Newspapers.com.
- "Carle Hessay show at arts centre". Aldergrove Star. Langley, British Columbia. 27 April 1977. p. 15 – via UBC Library Open Collections: BC Historical Newspapers.
- "Carl Hessay has city art display". Langley Advance. 25 February 1965. p. 6. Archived from the original on 30 November 2019 – via Newspapers.com.
- Chamberlain, Adrian (28 February 2014). "An homage to a friend and poet". Victoria Times Colonist. Archived from the original on 25 June 2018.
- "Escape Artist. Carle Hessay: Opera lover, gymnast & fighter against Fascism". Vancouver: ABC Bookworld. Autumn 2006. Archived from the original on 2 January 2020.
- "Fort pupils react to art display". Langley Advance. 11 June 1964. p. 11. Archived from the original on 19 August 2021 – via Newspapers.com.
- Gleeson, John (25 November 1976). "Artist displays work in school". White Rock & Surrey Sun Herald. Surrey, British Columbia.
- "Hessay art in show at White Rock". Langley Advance. 27 July 1977. p. 7. Archived from the original on 24 November 2023 – via Newspapers.com.
- "Hessay exhibit in White Rock". Langley Advance. 23 May 1979. p. 9. Archived from the original on 29 November 2019 – via Newspapers.com.
- Hilmo, Maidie, ed. (2014). For Kelly, with Love: Poems on the Abstracts of Carle Hessay (PDF). Victoria, British Columbia: Treeline Press. ISBN 978-0-920117-16-3. Archived (PDF) from the original on 27 July 2019.
- Hilmo, Maidie (16–31 January 2023). "The Legacy of Immigrant Artist Carle Hessay: A Man of Mystery". Philippine Asian News Today. Surrey, British Columbia. Archived from the original on 11 May 2024 – via Academia.edu.
- Hilmo, Maidie (April 2025). "Searching for Carle Hessay: The Immigrant Artist Who Shaped My Life" (PDF). International Journal of Arts, Humanities and Social Sciences. 6 (4). New York: Institute for Promoting Research and Policy Development: 78–86. doi:10.56734/ijahss.v6n5a7. ISSN 2693-2547. Archived (PDF) from the original on 18 May 2025.
- Hilmo, Maidie (2026). "Unravelling the Historical Roots to the Present in Hessay's Waiting at Wounded Knee". Borders in Globalization Review. 7 (1). University of Victoria. doi:10.18357/big_r71202522305. ISSN 2562-9913.
- Hooper, Roxanne (6 October 2016). "Langley's music school has historic ties to the visual arts". Langley Advance. Langley, British Columbia. Archived from the original on 23 July 2019.
- Hooper, Roxanne (11 May 2017). "A late Langley artist becomes the subject of a new documentary". Langley Advance. Langley, British Columbia. Archived from the original on 23 July 2019.
- "Local artist has special showing". Langley Advance. 7 September 1972. p. 14. Archived from the original on 29 November 2019 – via Newspapers.com.
- MacDonald, Colin S. (1979). A Dictionary of Canadian Artists. Vol. 2 (3rd ed.). Ottawa: Canadian Paperbacks Publishing Ltd – via Internet Archive.
- McMann, Evelyn de R. (2003). Biographical Index of Artists in Canada. University of Toronto Press. ISBN 0-8020-2790-3.
- "Museum To Display Ukrainian Folk Art". Richmond Review. Richmond, British Columbia. 3 October 1969. p. 7. Archived from the original on 29 November 2019 – via Newspapers.com.
- Oille, Jennifer (August–September 1984). "Dawson Creek". Canadian Forum. Toronto: 35–36.
- "One Man Show at Arts Centre". Surrey Leader. 22 June 1972. p. 4. Archived from the original on 27 July 2019 – via Newspapers.com.
- Paré, Arleen (2015). He Leaves His Face in the Funeral Car. Victoria, British Columbia: Caitlin Press. ISBN 978-1-927575-92-5.
- Thorpe, Winnifred (11 December 1971). "Langley artist paints for future generations". The New Westminster Columbian.
- Wang, Guochen (director) (2017). The Art and Soul of Carle Hessay, As We Knew Him (documentary film). University of Victoria.
- White, Brenda (16 June 1980). "Art Seen". The Vancouver Sun. Vancouver. p. B17. Archived from the original on 29 November 2019 – via Newspapers.com.
- Woods, Leonard A. (2005). Hilmo, Maidie (ed.). Meditations on the Paintings of Carle Hessay (PDF). Trail and Victoria, British Columbia: Trabarni Productions & Treeline Press. ISBN 1-895666-27-9. Archived (PDF) from the original on 27 July 2019.
- Youssef, Marten (24 December 2005). "Leonard Woods documents the work of his longtime friend". Langley Times. Langley, British Columbia. ProQuest 373011189.
