= Leonard Woods (sculptor) =

Canadian sculptor (1919–2014)

- Born: Leonard Archibald Woods; 13 November 1919; Stonewall, Manitoba, Canada
- Died: 6 September 2014 (aged 94); Langley, British Columbia, Canada
- Known for: Sculptor
- Notable work: The Angelic Symphony

Leonard Archibald Woods (1919–2014) was a Canadian sculptor, art historian, musician, composer, and author. He is best known for his sculptures The Angelic Symphony, as well as for being a co-founder of Langley Community Music School.

== Biography ==
Woods was born on 13 November 1919 in Stonewall, Manitoba. His father worked at the nearby Stony Mountain Penitentiary. He studied under LeMoine Fitzgerald at the Winnipeg School of Art, where he also learned sculpture, graduating in 1940. During World War II he served in the Royal Canadian Air Force before being discharged in 1943. After his service, he further trained in sculpture with Emmanuel Hahn at the Ontario College of Art. Woods moved west to British Columbia where he re-opened the sculpture department at the Vancouver School of Art.

In 1946, Woods exhibited three works with the British Columbia Artists Exhibition held at the Vancouver Art Gallery. Two years later, he created four bas-relief sculptures for the chancel of St. Andrew's-Wesley United Church in Vancouver. They were entitled The Angelic Symphony. Inspired by Psalm 150, the angels are represented playing modern musical instruments: a flute, a cello, a trumpet, and a pair of cymbals. The three hundred pound plaster sculptures were modelled at Langley Prairie and finished with five coats of shellac of varying colours.

Woods stayed with the sculpture department of the Vancouver School of Art until 1954, and remained its school historian until 1969. During the latter year, he co-founded the Langley Community Music School. Woods was a musician and composer. Some of his compositions included the folk opera Belbriggan Bay and the ballad The Dancing Girls of Cariboo. In 2005, he authored a book on Langley artist Carle Hessay, Meditations on the Paintings of Carle Hessay.

Woods died on 6 September 2014, at the age of 94 in Langley, British Columbia. The following year, Kwantlen Polytechnic University conferred a posthumous honorary degree on him for his role as a co-founder of Langley Community Music School. Three works by Woods are in the collection of the Winnipeg Art Gallery.
