= The Angelic Symphony =

Sculptures at St. Andrew's-Wesley United Church

- Artist: Leonard Woods
- Year: 1948
- Type: Plaster sculptures
- Subject: Angels
- Location: Vancouver, British Columbia, Canada; 49.281250°N 123.126756°W
- Owner: St. Andrew's-Wesley United Church

The Angelic Symphony is a set of four sculptures by Leonard Woods in the chancel of St. Andrew's-Wesley United Church in Vancouver.

The sculptures were commissioned in 1947 by Elisabeth Rogers, a founder of the Vancouver Art Gallery and Vancouver Symphony Orchestra. Woods worked closely with the minister of St. Andrew's-Wesley United Church, the Reverend Oswald W. S. McCall. Installation took place in July 1948. The sculptures depict four angels of the Bible, each representing a different type of musician: a cymbalist, a trumpeter, a flautist, and a cellist. Woods' inspiration was drawn from Psalm 150, where God is praised with musical instruments, and the intention was to visually echo the church organ. The angels are realistic, semi-clad, and androgynous. They were modelled from the sculptor's friends. The modernity of the angels' instruments, in place of conventional harps, was reported by newspapers across the country. The 300 pound sculptures were made at Langley Prairie of plaster reinforced with iron, based on reverse molds derived from clay imported from California. They were carved in bas-relief.

The original finish of the sculptures over the ivory plaster was semi-transparent shellac with a hint of amber, against a blue background. It was thought by some of the congregation that the colours were too prominent, so they were painted grey in 1954. The Anglican Diocese of New Westminster reported in 2004 that the sculptures would be restored to their original colours. The project was overseen by Barry Gilson and the restoration work undertaken by Rose Quintana, who worked with Haida artist Bill Reid on the monumental sculpture the Jade Canoe. After the restoration, Woods felt that the colours now harmonized with the more recent stained glass windows.
