= St. Andrew's-Wesley United Church =

Church building in Vancouver, British Columbia, Canada

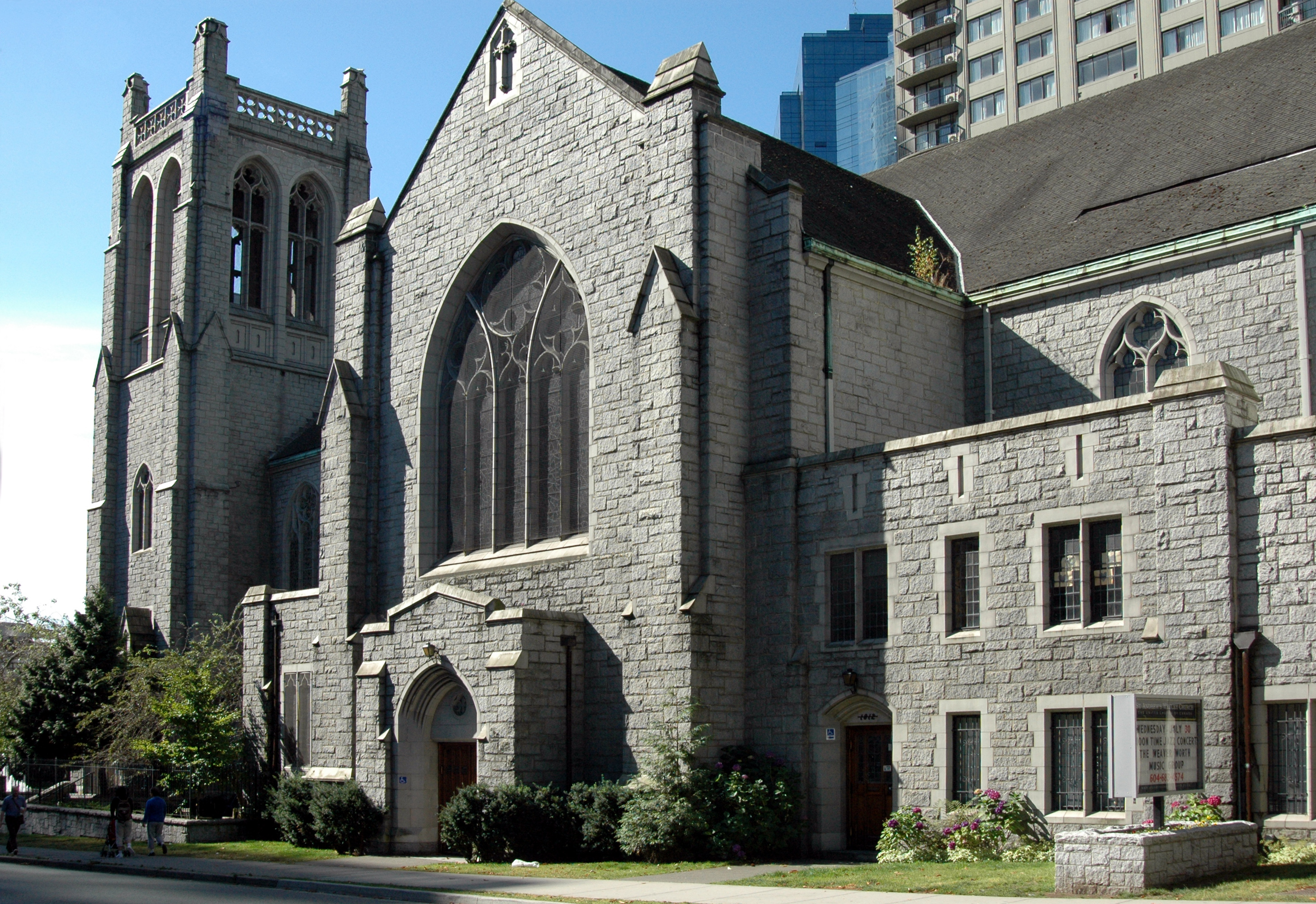
- St. Andrew's-Wesley United Church in 2008
- St. Andrew's-Wesley United Church
- 49.281250°N 123.126756°W
- Location: 1022 Nelson Street; Vancouver, British Columbia; V6E 4S7
- Language: English
- Denomination: United Church of Canada
- Website: standrewswesley.com

Architecture
- Completed: 1933

St. Andrew's-Wesley United Church is an affirming church located in the downtown core of the city of Vancouver. Part of the United Church of Canada, it welcomed its first congregation in 1933. Renowned for its architecture and art, the church underwent a major restoration beginning in 2019. It holds three services every week, including the long-standing jazz vespers.

== Early history ==
The origins of St. Andrew's-Wesley United Church begins with the establishment of the Methodist and Presbyterian churches in the Greater Vancouver area.

In the present-day city of Vancouver, on 30 July 1863, the Reverend Ebeneezer Robson, a Methodist minister from New Westminster, held the first preaching service of any kind at Stamp's (Hastings) Mill to a group of six men. A Methodist church was built in 1875 on Water Street for the Indigenous workers at the mill. It was destroyed in the Great Vancouver Fire of 1886. The church (called the Methodist Hall) was rebuilt. The congregation then attended the Homer Street Church, built in 1889, located at the corner of Homer and Dunsmuir Streets. It was followed by the Wesley Methodist Church, erected in 1901, and situated at Georgia and Burrard Streets.

Meanwhile, the local Presbyterian Church had its beginnings along the Fraser River south of Vancouver. The Reverend Robert Jamieson travelled upriver as far as Fort Langley, and established a church on Sea Island, in the river's estuary. Subsequently, the Reverend T. G. Thompson began services in Vancouver, and a Presbyterian church was built on Oppenheimer (now Cordova) Street. This building was destroyed in the Great Fire of 1886, and another church was built on the same street. This in turn was replaced by a church located at the corner of Hastings and Gore Streets. A growing need led to the construction of a second and more expansive building to the west, St. Andrew's Presbyterian, opened in 1890 and located at Georgia and Richards Streets.

The amalgamation of the two churches derived from the creation of the United Church of Canada in 1925, whereby a union was formed amongst the Methodist, Presbyterian, Congregational and Local Union churches. Looking ahead to this union, a committee was struck in 1924 to explore a merger of Wesley Methodist Church and St. Andrew's Presbyterian. In 1927, an affirmative vote on the union took place, and the first joint congregational meeting occurred in 1929. Funds were raised from the sale of Wesley Methodist church, and St. Andrew's-Wesley United Church was built on the corner of Burrard and Nelson Streets. It was dedicated on 26 May 1933 to overflowing crowds. The first minister was the Right Reverend Bishop Willard Brewing.

== Architecture and art ==
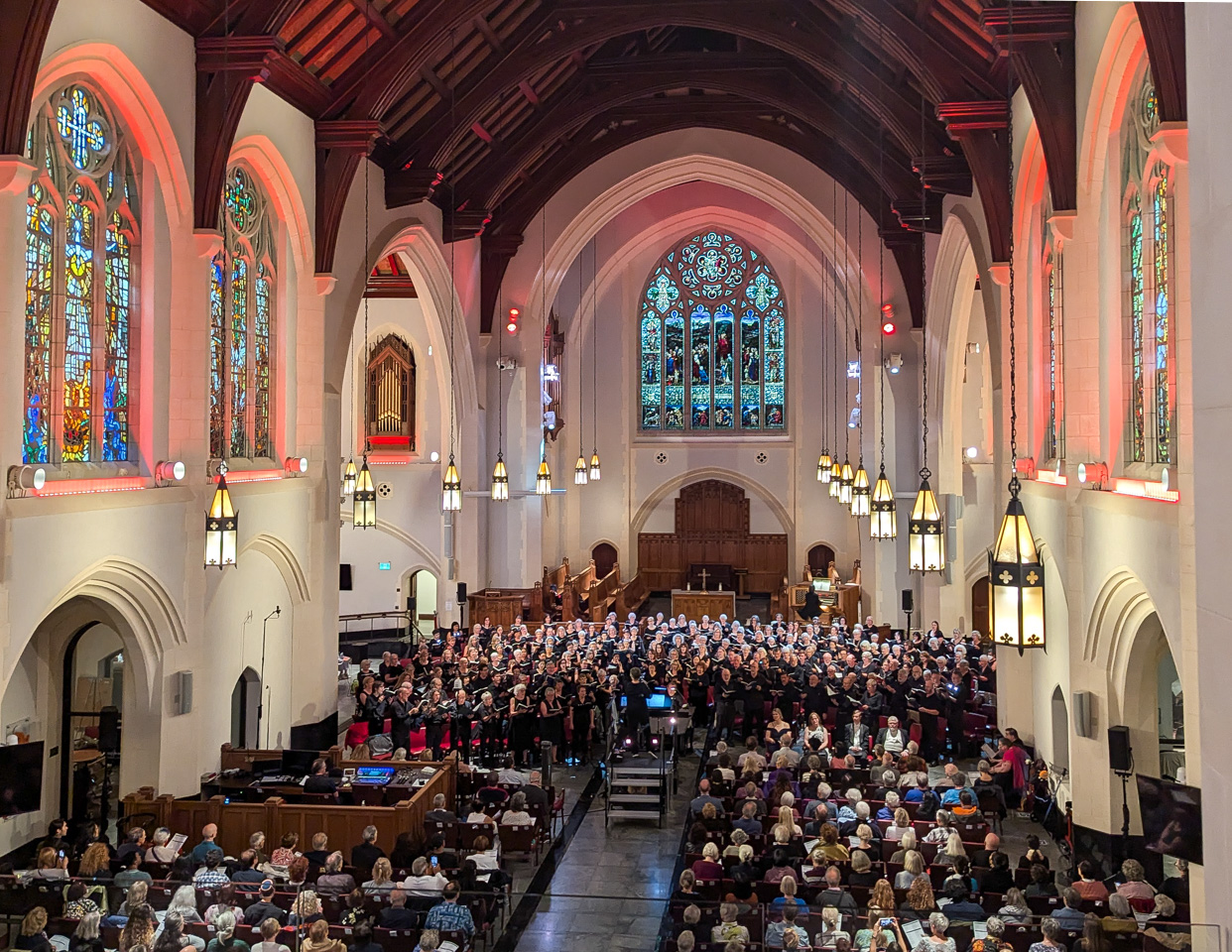
Performance of Mozart's Requiem by Summerchor in Vancouver's St. Andrews-Wesley, August 24, 2024

The church was designed by the firm of Twizel & Twizel. With the exception of the terra cotta, materials were sourced locally from British Columbia. It was constructed using granite from Nelson Island and stone from Haddington Island. The church has a late 14th-century Gothic Revival tower, and is laid out in a cruciform shape. The interior has a vaulted timber roof.

St. Andrew's-Wesley United Church has the most diverse array of stained glass windows of any church in Vancouver. The first window installed was commissioned in 1935 by the Prime Minister of Canada, R. B. Bennett, in memory of his sister, Evelyn Bennett Coates. The artist chosen was Duncan Dearle, of London's William Morris & Company. Dearle designed the window above the altar, The Sermon on the Mount, and went on to produce ten other windows for the church. In 1969, St. Andrew's-Wesley commissioned French stained glass artist Gabriel Loire for the east window, the inspiration drawn from Mark 16:15, "Go Ye into all the World." It is saturated with the colour blue, harkening back to medieval artists. In addition, Loire fashioned six panels illustrating women of the bible. At this time he also supplied cartoons for eight more windows, consisting of a set of four with an Old Testament theme which were to face their more light-filled New Testament counterparts. These windows were installed in 1981. In contrast to the older leaded glass technique, Loire's creations were made using the more robust Dalle de verre method. Other artists who have designed stained glass for the church include Rupert Moore, Louise Duthie, and Lutz Haufschild.

In the chancel there are four bas-relief sculptures of angels playing musical instruments, a flute, a cello, a trumpet and a pair of cymbals. Evoking Psalm 150, they were sculpted in the late 1940s by Leonard Woods and are called The Angelic Symphony.

== Economics and restoration ==
In 2000, the church received approval from the city of Vancouver to build an apartment building at a cost of $35-million. The result was a 22-storey tower with 199 residences, St. Andrew's Residence at Wesley Place. In 2019, the church property was the most expensive religious real estate in Vancouver, valued at $85.7 million.

In 2019, it was reported the church would close for two years to undergo a major restoration. Besides a seismic upgrading and receiving a new copper roof, the original plaster interiors would be restored, and a new stone floor and pews put in place. The work was undertaken by Ryder Architecture and RJC Engineers. The organ was also refurbished and the renovations were complete in 2021. The restoration work won a 2021 B.C. Heritage Award and a 2023 Vancouver Heritage Conservation Award.

== Reconciliation ==
Between 1849 and 1969, the United Church of Canada and its predecessors operated fifteen residential schools in the country. In 1986, the Moderator of the church, the Reverend Robert Smith, apologized to Indigenous people for past wrongs, a declaration that was somewhat controversial at the time. In 1998, the church made a more specific apology for its participation in the residential school system, which it re-affirmed in 2018. The United Church of Canada has had two Indigenous Moderators, the Right Reverends Stan McKay and the current Carmen Lansdowne.

In 1940, St. Andrew's-Wesley United Church installed a bronze plaque commemorating Reverend Charles Montgomery Tate (1852–1933), a missionary of the Methodist Church and a founder of Coqualeetza residential school in Chilliwack. He had a mixed legacy, being generally well regarded by the Indigenous community, and writing a Chinook-English dictionary while at the same time opposing the potlatch. In a gesture of reconciliation, in 2021 the church commissioned Xwalacktun (Rick Harry), a Skwxwú7mesh (Squamish) carver, to reconceptualize the plaque in an appropriate way. The figures of Xwalacktun's resulting house post have ascendancy while not suppressing the plaque. As a mark of respect and to denote the occasion, the church invited Sam George, a Skwxwú7mesh elder and residential school survivor, to give a sermon.

== Services ==
The year 2017 marked the 25th anniversary of the church's Sunday evening jazz vesper services. St. Andrew's-Wesley United Church holds two additional Sunday services. The location serves also as a concert venue and is a popular site for television and film productions.

== Media connection ==
According to CTV, along with an unnamed Bowen Island community group, St Andrew's-Wesley United Church sponsored Ibrahim Ali into Canada. Ali was later convicted of raping and murdering a 13-year-old girl in Burnaby, British Columbia.

== See also ==
- List of heritage buildings in Vancouver
- Murder of Marrisa Shen
