= Murder of Marrisa Shen =

2017 child murder in Burnaby, British Columbia

Marrisa Shen
- Born: October 20, 2003
- Died: July 18, 2017 (age 13); Burnaby, British Columbia, Canada

Chinese name
- Chinese: 申小雨
- Hanyu Pinyin: Shēn Xiǎoyǔ
Transcriptions
Standard Mandarin
- Hanyu Pinyin: Shēn Xiǎoyǔ
Yue: Cantonese
- Jyutping: San^{1} Siu^{2}-jyu^{5}

Marrisa Shen (October 20, 2003 – July 18, 2017) was a 13-year-old Canadian girl who was raped and murdered in a wooded area in Central Park, in Burnaby, British Columbia, Canada. Shen was reported missing by her parents on the evening of July 18, 2017, after she failed to return home from what was supposed to be a brief trip to a nearby Tim Hortons. Early the next morning, police located her body in the park by tracking the GPS device inside her mobile phone. The RCMP stated the attack appeared to be random. After Shen's murder, the RCMP told parents to talk to their children about safety and warned the public to be vigilant.

At its peak, nearly three hundred officers were involved in the investigation. Some "2,000 persons of interest" were investigated and were ruled out in the case. There was little progress in the case for more than a year and on the one-year anniversary of Shen's murder, her family issued a letter asking the public's assistance in locating and bringing her attacker to justice.

On September 7, 2018, the RCMP arrested Ibrahim Ali, a Syrian refugee, for Shen's murder. He was found guilty of first-degree murder on December 8, 2023.

== Suspect ==
After a 14-month impasse from the date of the murder, on September 7, 2018, RCMP arrested Ibrahim Ali (born in 1990 in Syria) as the prime suspect for the murder of Marrisa Shen. Police used a DNA dragnet technique to identify the suspect. Ali was charged with first-degree murder.

Ali had arrived in Canada as a refugee from Syria in April 2017, three months before the murder of Shen. He was sponsored by a coalition of families on Bowen Island, as well as Vancouver's St. Andrew's-Wesley United Church. Ali became a permanent resident of Canada sometime before his first court appearance on September 14, with the trial initially set for October 12, 2018, but subsequently pushed back to September 2022, and then again to January 2023. Jury selection began in March 2023, and the trial commenced in April 2023, concluding in December 2023.

== Legal proceedings ==
=== Trial and sentencing ===
Ali was tried by a judge and jury, with the trial beginning on April 5, 2023. At the same time, a publication ban was put in place for all publications, removing any mentions of Shen's name from the media until the end of the trial. Ali pleaded not guilty, stating he did not kill Shen.

Sexual assault expert Dr. Tracy Pickett, who testified for the prosecution, was found dead in Vancouver's Dunbar–Southlands neighbourhood on September 28, 2023. Police stated there was no foul play. Her testimony was consequently thrown out since it could not be cross-examined.

Ali was found guilty of first-degree murder on December 8, 2023. He was given the mandatory sentence of life in prison with no possibility of parole for 25 years, on June 7, 2024.

=== Controversial statements by the defence ===
During the closing arguments of the trial, Ali’s lawyer Kevin McCullough said Shen was not "innocent", and that it was not "outlandish" to suggest Shen found Ali attractive, further suggesting consensual sex may have taken place. Shen's family reacted negatively to the defence's closing arguments in the courtroom, later releasing a statement that they were filing formal complaints against McCullough and his co-counsel, and seeking their disbarment.

Days after the trial ended, on December 12, Shen's father was arrested by the Vancouver Police Department for allegedly bringing a loaded Glock pistol to the courtroom on the last day of the trial with the "intent to kill" the defence counsel. The father was later released, pending further investigation by the police. McCullough had previously read out in court a note that threatened to kill him before Christmas.

The claims were later refuted by the father's lawyer, calling them "unfounded accusations". At the same time, the defence counsel requested to exclude the father from post-trial court proceedings. A Supreme Court judge subsequently rejected this request, allowing the father to remotely listen to the proceedings through an interpreter via telephone.

== Politicization ==
Ali's status as a recent Syrian refugee raised questions about Prime Minister Justin Trudeau's immigration policy. Ali's court appearances were picketed by protesters calling for "comprehensive security screening" for refugee migration from Syria and to "hold Trudeau accountable." Members of the Syrian-Canadian community also held vigils in remembrance of Shen, oftentimes alongside the protests opposing refugee migration from Syria.

The discussion surrounding the killing became a significant point of contention during the February 2019 federal by-election for Burnaby South, with People's Party candidate Laura-Lynn Thompson integrating Shen's death into her anti-immigration platform. Karen Wang, a Liberal candidate who later renounced her candidacy for the by-election due to an unrelated racism scandal, was also a known family friend of the Shen family. Additionally, Conservative MP Michelle Rempel invoked Shen's murder in a call for immigration screening review reform.

A spokesperson for Shen's mother communicated that while she appreciates the attention given to Marrisa's murder, she does not want the case to become political—instead, "they should focus on the violence against women and children in our society, especially women of colour."

== See also ==
- List of solved missing person cases (post-2000)
