= Kathryn Kerby-Fulton =

English professor

Kathryn Kerby-Fulton FSA
- Born: 1955 (age 70–71)
- Occupation: Historian

Academic background
- Education: University of York
- Thesis: (1986)

Academic work
- Discipline: Medieval history Medieval texts
- Institutions: University of Victoria; University of Notre Dame

Kathryn Kerby-Fulton FSA (born 1955) is a Canadian historian and Professor Emerita of English at the University of Notre Dame.

== Biography ==
Kerby-Fulton completed her PhD, titled "The voice of honest indignation : A study of reformist apocalypticism in relation to Piers Plowman" at the University of York in 1986.

From 1986 to 1998 she taught at the University of Victoria. In 1994 she received the John Nicholas Brown Prize from the Medieval Academy of America for the 1990 publication of her PhD thesis as "Reformist Apocalypticism and Piers Plowman" (University of Cambridge Press). In 1996 she received the University's Alumni Award for Excellence in Teaching and also became a member of the Institute for Advanced Study.

She was elected as a Fellow of the Society of Antiquaries of London on 5 December 2019.

== Publications ==
- 1990. Reformist apocalypticism and Piers Plowman. University of Cambridge Press.
- 1997 (with S. Justice). Written work : Langland, labor, and authorship. University of Pennsylvania Press.
- 1999 (with D. L. Despres). Iconography and the professional reader: the politics of book production in the Douce Piers Plowman. University of Minnesota Press.
- 2005 (with L. Olsen). Voices in dialogue: reading women in the Middle Ages. University of Notre Dame Press.
- 2006. Books under suspicion: censorship and tolerance of revelatory writing in late medieval England. University of Notre Dame Press.
- 2009. Women and the divine in literature before 1700: essays in memory of Margot Louis. ELS Editions.
- —— (2024-07-01). "Adam Pinkhurst and the Baffled Jury: Assessing Scribal Identifications within the Margin of Error". Speculum. 99 (3): 664–687. doi:10.1086/730564. ISSN 0038-7134.
