= Langley Community Music School =

Music school, in Langley, British Columbia

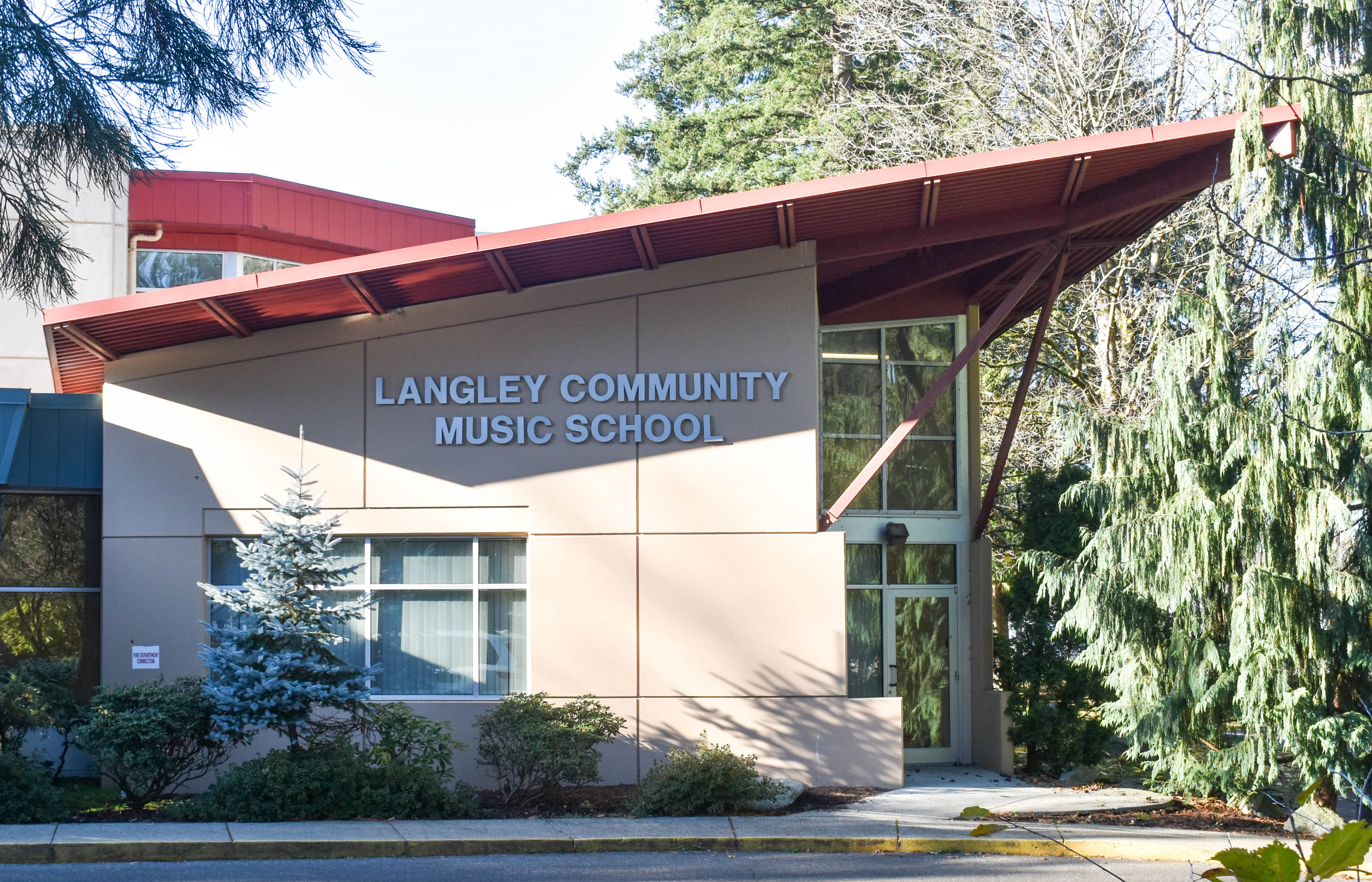

Location
- 4899 207 Street; Langley, British Columbia, V3A 2E4; Canada; 49.0921355°N 122.6495024°W

Information
- School type: Music school
- Established: 1969
- Principal: Carolyn Granholm

Langley Community Music School is an educational institution located in Langley, British Columbia. Founded in 1969, it teaches the Orff, Suzuki, and Kodály methods, as well as giving private instruction in most instruments and theory. It is the third largest of the community music schools in the province, and is a member of the B.C. Association of Community Music Schools.

== History ==
Langley Community Music School first opened at the Langley Arts Centre in 1969 with just two dozen students. Its founders were Marilyn Lamont, Linda Bickerton-Ross, Leonard Woods, Peter Ewart, and Keith Lamont. Attendance grew rapidly and in 1972 the school achieved non-profit status. In 1979, cellist Ian Hamptom was appointed music director. A new building at the present location was established in 2001. Susan Magnusson succeeded Hampton as principal in 2005. By that year, there were over 800 students. Carolyn Granholm became principal in 2018.

== Philosophy and Program ==
The school's aspiration is a high standard of musical instruction and also to promote community cultural objectives. It offers classes to the younger students in the Orff, Suzuki, and Kodály methods, while traditional methods lead more advanced students to the Royal Conservatory of Music exams. There are lessons for piano, woodwind, brass, stringed instruments, harp, guitar, voice, theory, harmony, counterpoint, and analysis. Scholarships and bursaries are available. The school sponsors recitals, master classes, workshops, and ensembles. Langley Community Music School has commissioned dozens of contemporary works from local composers, spotlighted during Canadian Music Week. Notable alumni include pianist Susan Tang, jazz trumpeter Brad Turner, and violinist and composer Brooklyn Wood.
