= 0 Avenue =

Road in British Columbia, Canada

Coordinates: 49.002312°N 122.492623°W

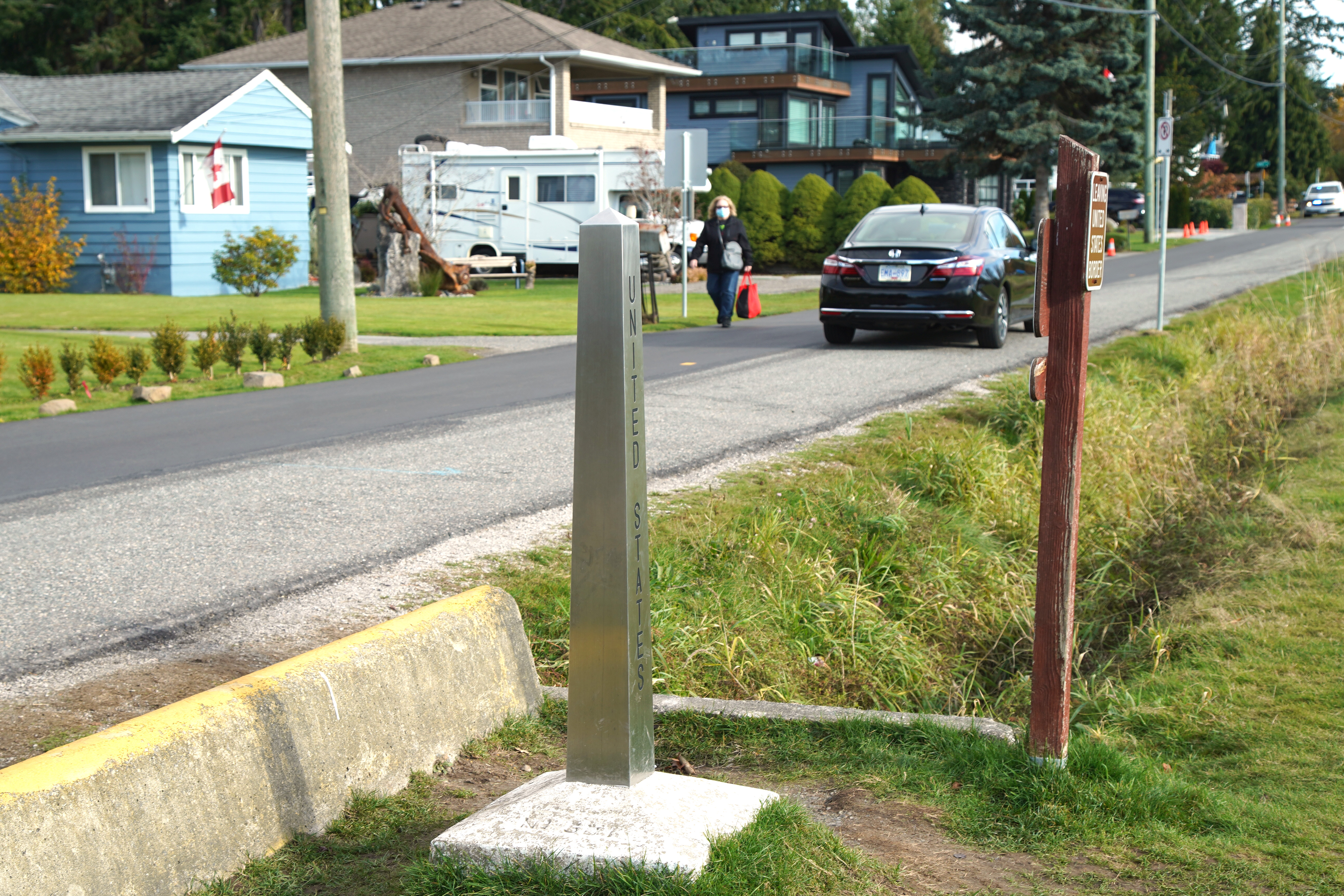
- 0 Avenue by the border, as seen from the United States
- Interactive map of 0 Avenue
- Length: 29.0 km (18.0 mi)
- Location: Surrey, Langley (Township), Abbotsford
- West end: Peace Park Drive in Surrey
- East end: Townline Road in Abbotsford

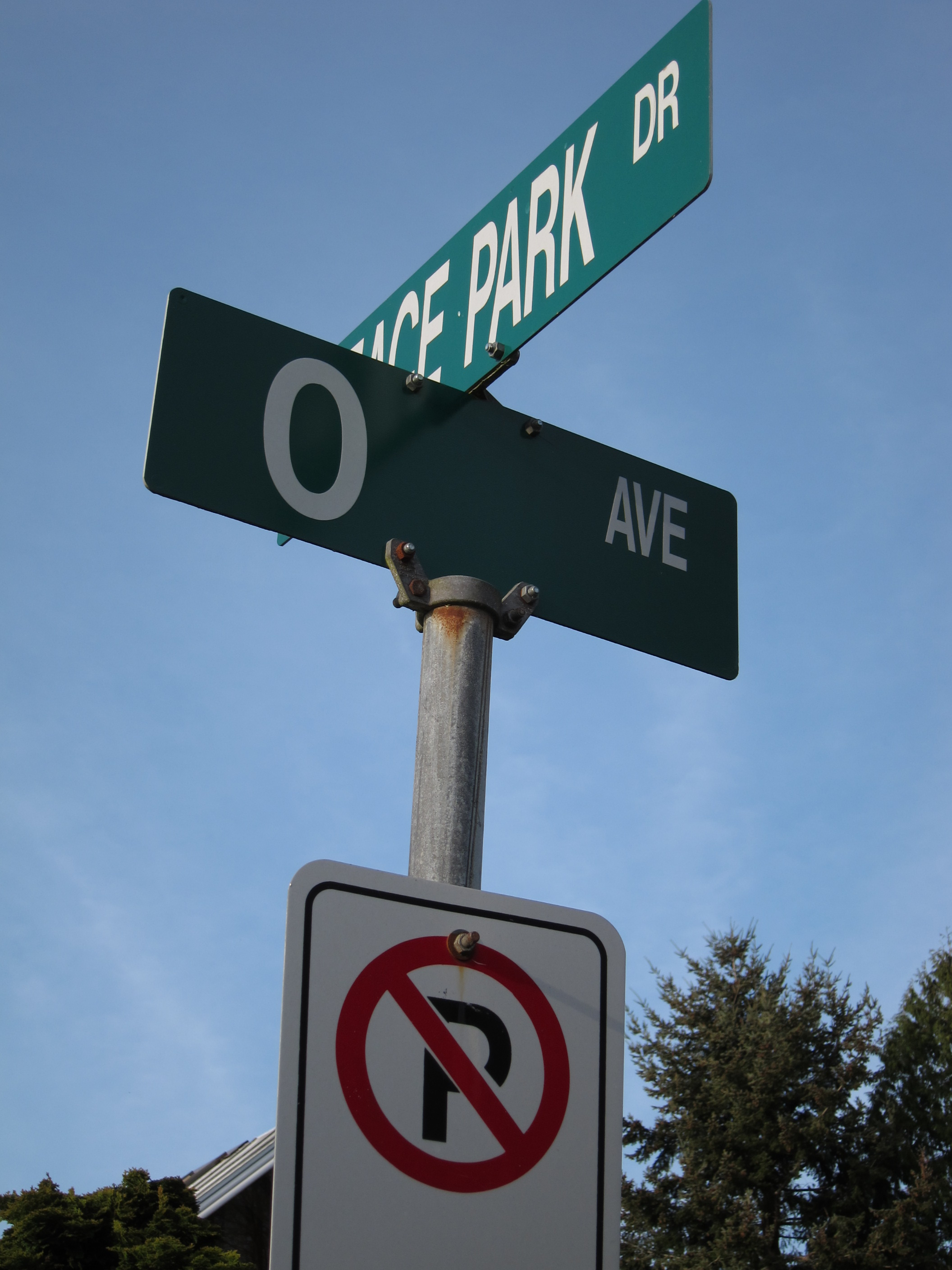
Peace Park Drive and 0 Avenue

0 Avenue (Zero Avenue) is a road in the Lower Mainland, British Columbia, running beside the Canada–United States border from Surrey to Abbotsford. The road runs parallel to the border between the two countries.

The road begins near the Peace Arch Border Crossing, and continues eastward for 28.9 kilometres (18.0 mi), with gaps around the Pacific Highway and Lynden–Aldergrove Border Crossings. Boundary Road on the US side runs for 1.5 miles (2.4 km) along 0 Avenue and again one mile (1.6 km) to the west, with many cameras watching the border, before the U.S. road ends at the Lynden–Aldergrove Border Crossing. 0 Avenue continues west along the northern border of Peace Arch Historical State Park to Peace Arch Crossing. Small pedestrian bridges cross a trench on the border. At the eastern end of 0 Avenue, the road turns north.

In 1858, after creating a 1.5-mile (2.4 km) road from White Rock, along the beach through the Semiahmoo Indian Reserve, a border trail was created by Royal Engineers and American surveyors. The trail ran east and is the precursor to the modern 0 Avenue.

The road is used by smugglers, even though the border controls have tightened up since the September 11 attacks. The first known drug tunnel along the Canada–United States border was found east of the Lynden–Aldergrove crossing in 2005. Some asylum seekers have also tried to move to Canada from the U.S. via 0 Avenue.

During the COVID-19 pandemic, restrictions on cross-border travel made 0 Avenue a meeting place for several cross-border couples. Once restrictions were lifted, some of these couples married at Peace Arch Park, a transnational park between Blaine and Surrey.

== Major intersections ==
Regional District	Location	km	mi	Destinations	Notes
Metro Vancouver	Surrey	0.0	0.0	Peace Park Drive	Roadway continues north as Peace Park Drive; connects to Highway 99 north
Metro Vancouver	Surrey	Gap in route			
Metro Vancouver	Surrey	1.4	0.87	Highway 15 (176 Street) – Pacific Highway Border Crossing	Resumes as 1 Avenue
Metro Vancouver	Surrey	1.7	1.1	177A Street	Roadway turns south and becomes 177A Street
Metro Vancouver	Surrey	1.9	1.2	0 Avenue	Roadway turns east and becomes 0 Avenue
Metro Vancouver	Langley (Township)	19.3	12.0	264 Street	Eastbound access to Hwy 13
Metro Vancouver	Langley (Township)	19.8	12.3	Highway 13 – Lynden–Aldergrove Border Crossing	No access from the west (dead end); no westbound to southbound turns
Fraser Valley	Abbotsford	29.0	18.0	Townline Road	Roadway continues north as Townline Road
1.000 mi = 1.609 km; 1.000 km = 0.621 mi: Incomplete access; Route transition
