= Langley, British Columbia (district municipality) =

Municipality in British Columbia, Canada

Langley
- District municipality
- The Corporation of the Township of Langley
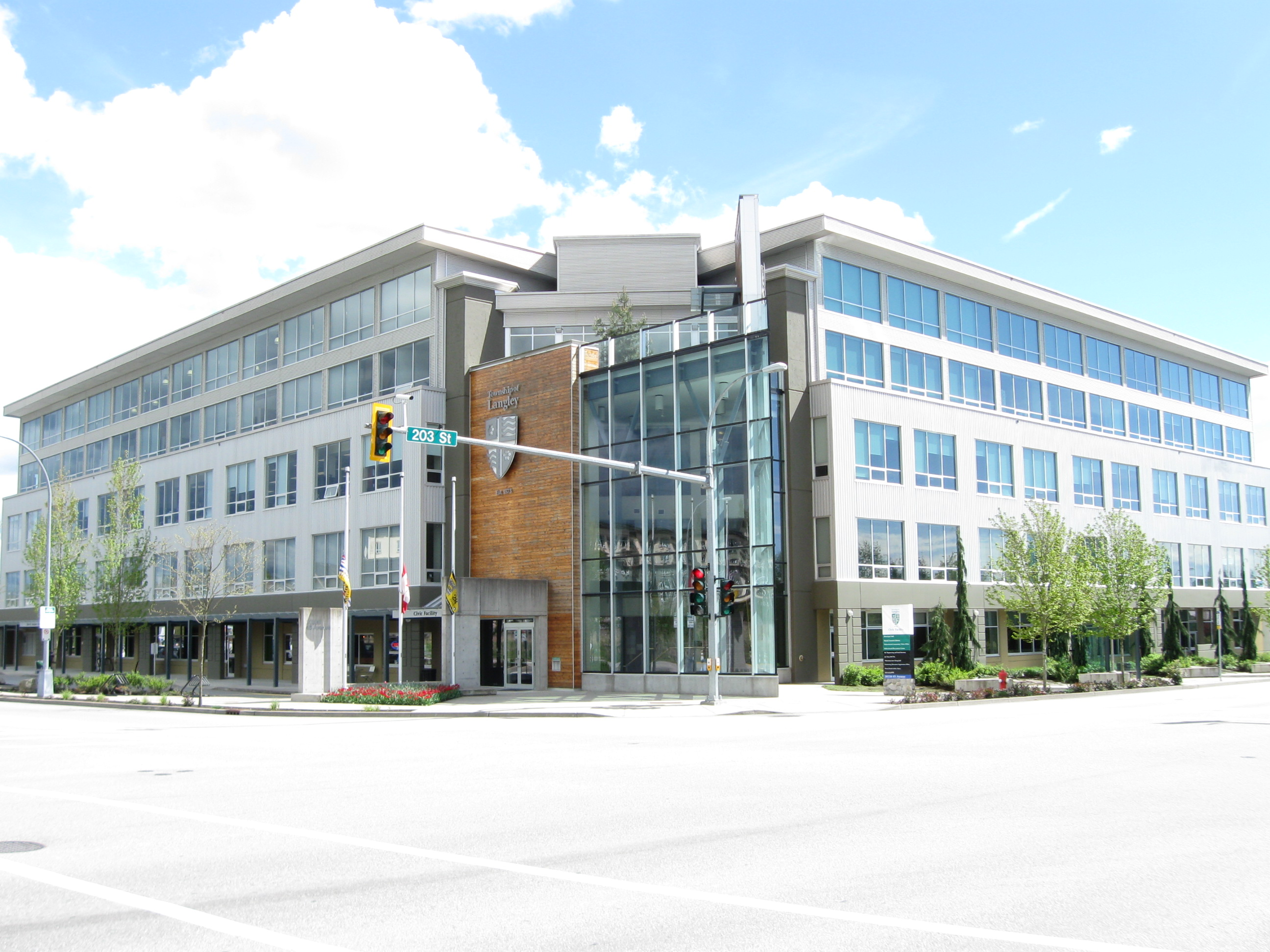
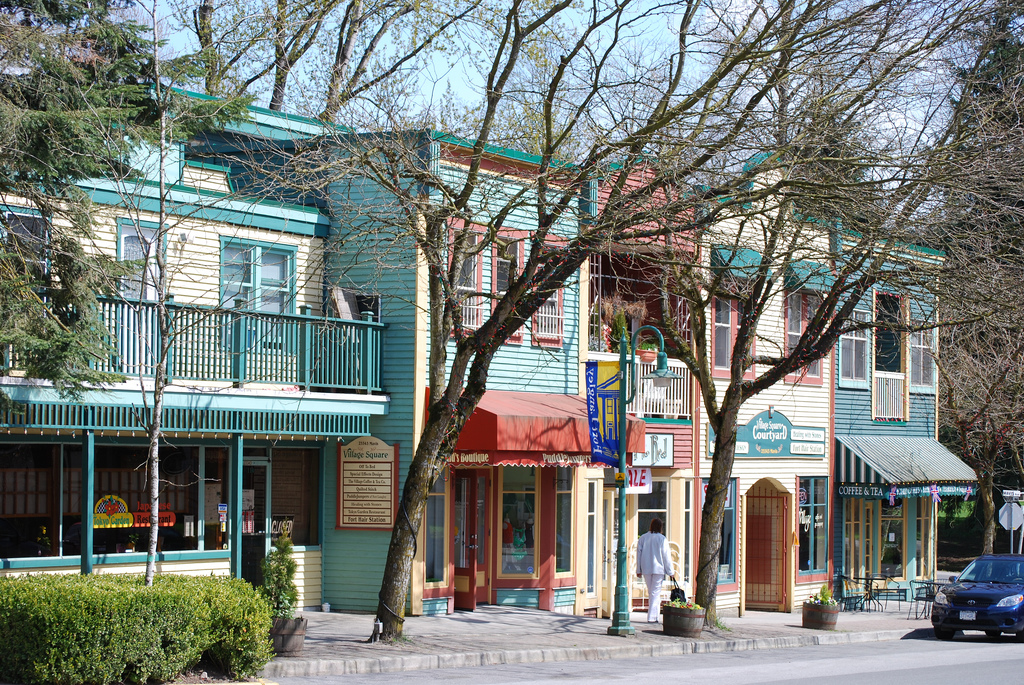
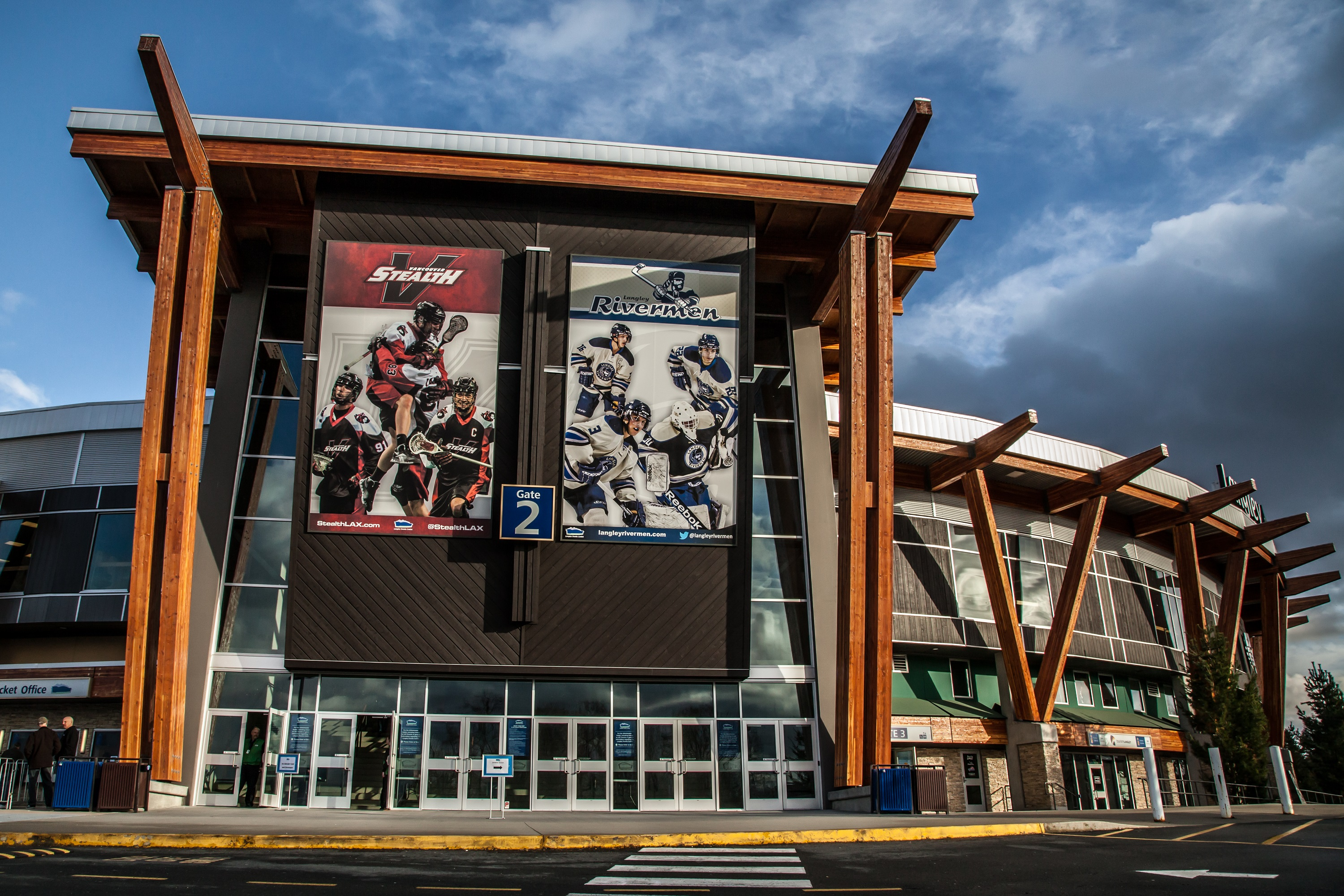
- Township of Langley Civic Facility Fort Langley Langley Events Centre

- Coat of arms
- Nickname: Langley Township
- Motto: "Nothing Without Effort"
- Location of Langley Township in Metro Vancouver
- Country: Canada
- Province: British Columbia
- Regional district: Metro Vancouver
- Incorporated: April 26, 1873
- Seat: Civic Facility

Government
  - Type: Mayor-council government
  - Mayor: Jay Lundgren
  - Councillors: List of Councillors: Barb Martens; Misty Van Popta; Kim Richter; Rob Rindt; Tim Baillie; Michael Pratt; Steve Ferguson; Margaret Kunst
  - MP: Tako Van Popta (CPC) Sukhman Gill (CPC) Tamara Jansen (CPC)
  - MLA: Harman Bhangu (CPBC) Jody Toor (CPBC) Misty Van Popta (CPBC)

Area
  - Land: 307.22 km^{2} (118.62 sq mi)

Population (2021)
  - Total: 132,603
  - Estimate (2023): 148,653
  - Rank: Ranked 44th in Canada
  - Density: 431.6/km^{2} (1,118/sq mi)
- Time zone: UTC−07:00 (Pacific Time)
- Forward sortation area: V1M, V2Y – V3A, V4W
- Area codes: 604, 778, 236, 672
- Website: www.tol.ca

The Township of Langley is a district municipality immediately east of the City of Surrey in southwestern British Columbia, Canada. It extends south from the Fraser River to the Canada–United States border, and west of the City of Abbotsford. Langley Township is not to be confused with the City of Langley, which is adjacent to the township but politically is a separate entity. Langley is located in the eastern part of Metro Vancouver.

== History ==
=== First Nations ===
Throughout the last several millennia, the area that is now Langley Township was inhabited by various Stó꞉lō nations, including the Katzie and Kwantlen. There is limited recorded history from this time, as much was passed down through oral tradition rather than written documents. The Kwantlen were a major factor in the salmon trade that later operated out of the Fort Langley. Simon Fraser, while traveling through the Sto:lo territory in 1808 recorded the image of a Kwantlen village:

Their houses are built of cedar planks and in shape, similar to the one already described, the whole range, which is six hundred and forty feet long by sixty broad, is under one roof, the front is eighteen feet high and the covering is slanting: all the apartments which are separated by partitions are square, except the Chief's, which is ninety feet long. In this room the posts or pillars are nearly three feet in diameter at the base and diminish gradually to the top. In one of these posts is an oval opening answering the purpose of the door through which one man may crawl in or out. Above, on the outside, are carved human figures as large as life, with other figures in imitation of beasts and birds.

=== Fort Langley (1827–1955) ===
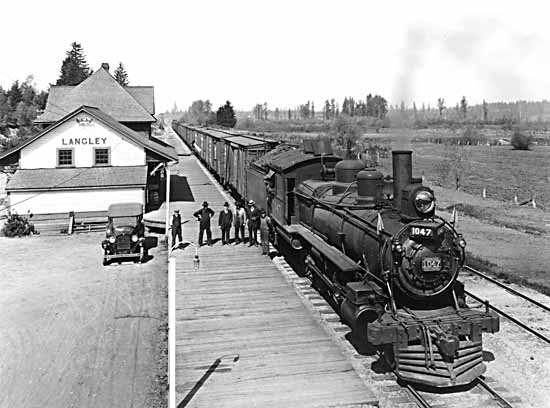
C.N.R. Locomotive at the Langley Railway Station, 1924

The first Europeans to stay in the area permanently were the traders of the Hudson's Bay Company (HBC). In 1827, Fort Langley was built on the banks of the Fraser River, in the area now known as Derby Reach. It was one of a string of trading posts built along the Pacific Coast to compete with American fur traders for the rich pelts available in the region. Farming as well as cranberry and salmon exports soon replaced fur trading as the fort's primary source of income.

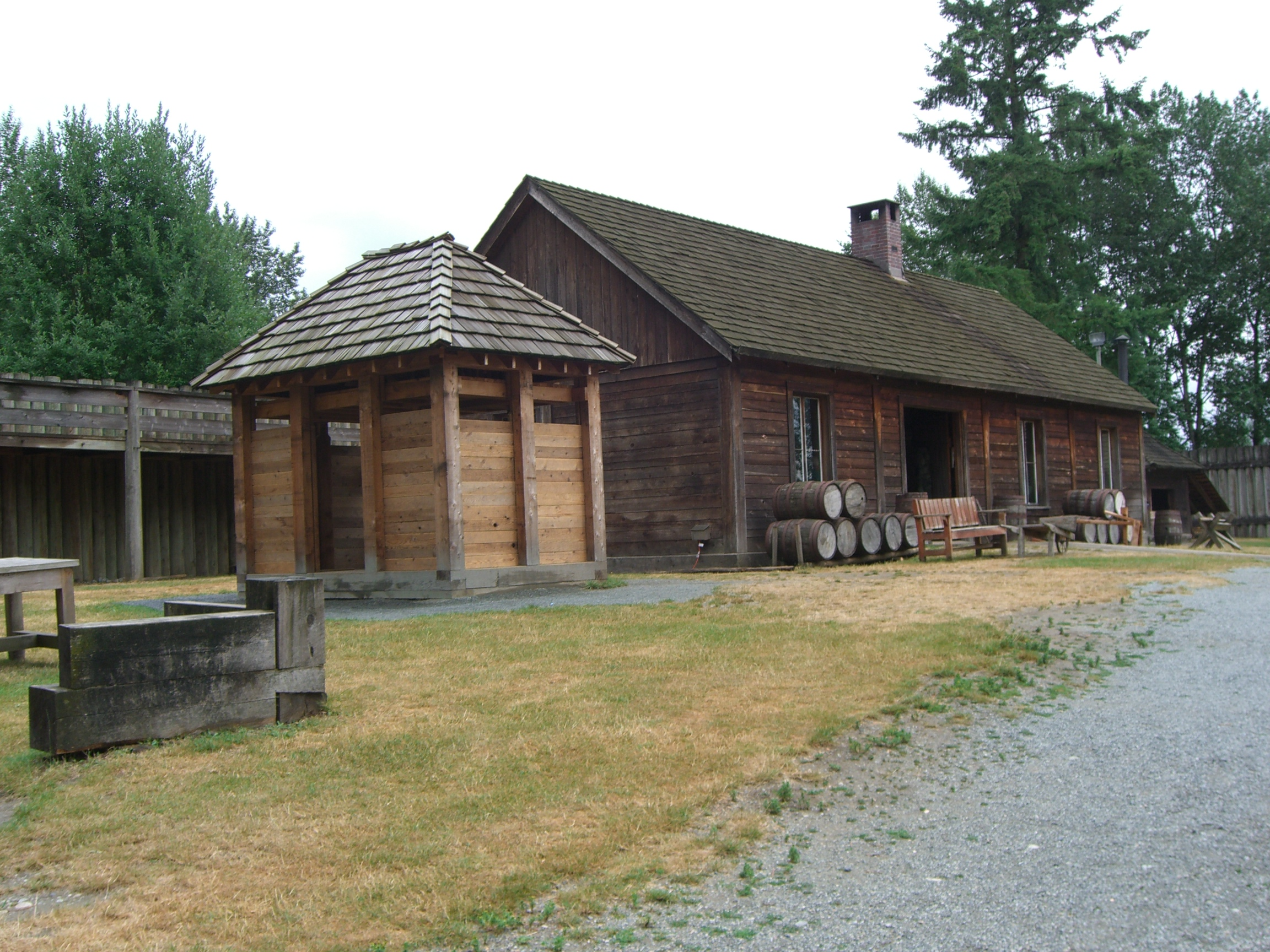
Inside the 1839 fort at Fort Langley National Historic Site

The first fort (1827–1839), built with two bastions, a wooden stockade and several buildings, proved to have been built too close to a fast-moving part of the river, in an area prone to flooding. It was rebuilt in 1839 farther upstream. As the HBC's network of forts in the interior grew, Fort Langley became a hub for farming, smithing and for shipping furs back to Europe. Along with farming, the export of cranberries and salmon would soon become the fort's main source of profit.

In 1858, gold was discovered in the Fraser River in what is now the interior of British Columbia, and the fort also became important as a supply station for the miners heading up the river toward the gold fields. With thousands of gold prospectors, many of them American, streaming into the region, the British government created British Columbia as a colony. James Douglas was sworn in as the new colony's first governor in Fort Langley, but New Westminster was chosen as the capital, as Fort Langley was less defensible from an American invasion.

When the gold rush ended, Fort Langley's importance began to decline. The Hudson's Bay Company subdivided and sold the farm it was occupying on Langley Prairie. Farming and logging took over as the dominant local industries.

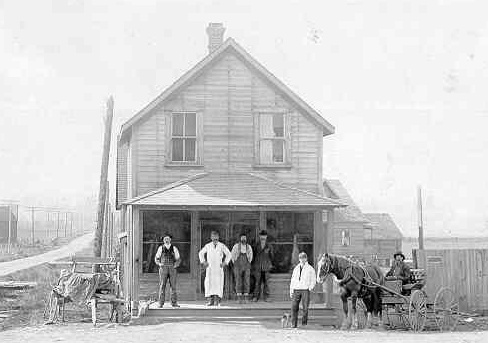
Porter's General Store in Murrayville

In 1870, Paul Murray settled what is known today as Murrayville. Together with his sons he owned a quarter section of land on each of the four corners of Yale Road and what now is 216th Street. At that time, this area became known as "Murrays corner" after Alexander Murray, who drowned in the Fraser River in January 1884 while attempting in vain to save a friend. In 1925, the post office named it "Murrayville". The area between 216 street, 216A street, 48th ave and 48A avenue is one of the oldest subdivisions in Langley. Of the eight building lots in this subdivision there are still 6 heritage houses (built before 1930).

The Township of Langley was incorporated on April 26, 1873, with James W. Mackie as its first elected warden. Over time, New Westminster and then Vancouver developed into urban centres, but Langley Township remained predominantly a rural community.

The growth of transportation continued to connect Langley Township with its surroundings. The British Columbia Electric Railway was built through the community in 1910, followed by Fraser Highway in the 1920s, and the construction of the Pattullo Bridge in 1937, all adding to Langley's importance.

These developments impacted the Langley Prairie area in particular, transforming it into the Township's main urban and commercial core. In turn, this birthed the need for upgraded and new amenities, especially with respect to health, infrastructure, safety and sanitation, in the neighbourhood. The municipal government, however, refused to finance these projects as it bowed, instead, to politically influential farming communities and smaller, mostly rural, business centres, like Fort Langley, Milner and Murrayville, that viewed such spending as unnecessary. Talk of secession began in Langley Prairie in the 1930s, as a result. Headed by a panel of important residents and businesspersons, including Richard Langdon, president of the Langley Board of Trade, the push for independence came to a head in the 1950s. Specifically, two issues decided Langley's future – street lights, which Langley Prairie argued were not only needed for safety but also progress, but on which reeve George Brooks declared "not a nickel" would be spent, and Langley Prairie's belief that it did not have the political sway or its fair share of municipal services that it deserved relative to its local tax contribution. Langley Prairie by now made up 20% of the Township's tax base. A referendum on secession was therefore held in September 1954. It passed with over 85% of the vote. Langley Prairie officially seceded and became the City of Langley on March 15, 1955.

=== Post–World War II period (1955–1999) ===
Neighbourhoods in Langley, British Columbia
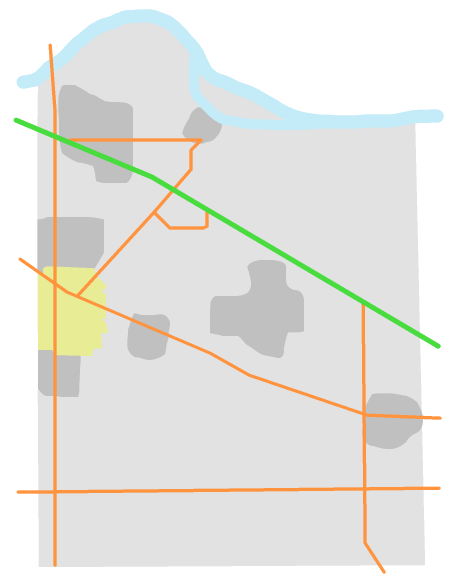

Langley's growth increased during the economic boom after the Second World War. In 1957, Langley Township, along with other municipalities in British Columbia adopted the grid system for the road network. In 1967, Langley Township became part of Metro Vancouver. As with many other parts of Canada and cities in the United States, the Vancouver region expanded with the growth of the suburb. With the completion of the faster Trans-Canada Highway route in 1964 in the north of Langley, suburb communities such as Walnut Grove appeared in Langley which were popular with commuters. Most of this growth happened outside of the original communities of Fort Langley and Murrayville, instead happening adjacent to Langley City and near the Trans-Canada highway, likely due to the influence of private automobiles.

=== 21st century ===
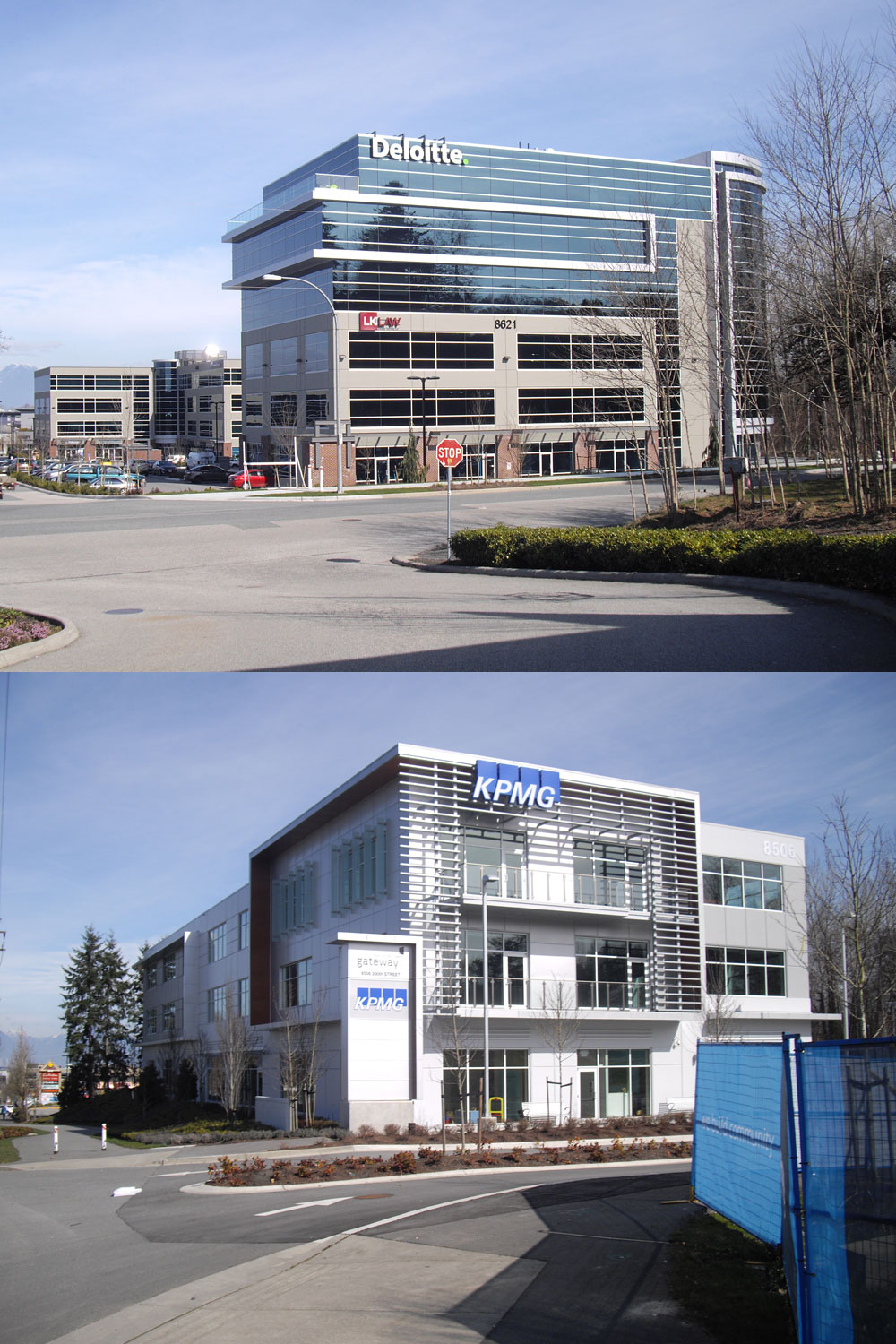
Modern office buildings in Carvolth area of Willoughby

In February 2006, the Township of Langley moved its Municipal Hall from the "core area" of the Township to the growing Willoughby area. The new facility also includes a new library, fitness room (which incorporates a special type of hardwood floor room) and a new community policing station.

Since the 1980s, Langley City and surrounding lands administered by the municipality have been subject to extensive strip mall development. The old town core remains pleasant to walk through, but many core businesses (including the civil courts and several banks) have moved to the malls, fostering an automobile-dominated community. In addition to this, the community allowed extensive strip development along the Langley Bypass, which has become the new sprawled business area of the city.

In the 1990s, the Village of Fort Langley has undergone a revitalization of its core that enhanced its heritage character. In fact, there are no franchises permitted in the village and this has raised its profile as a tourist and independent retail destination with hundreds of thousands of annual visitors. A rowing facility completed in 2009 brings a whole new segment of visitors to the area. In 2016, the landmark Coulter Berry Building was completed, marking the first LEED certified building in Fort Langley.

Construction of the Golden Ears Bridge has been completed and opened to traffic on June 16, 2009. The bridge spans the Fraser River and connects the Township of Langley with the communities of Maple Ridge and Pitt Meadows. In addition, the plan for the Carvolth neighbourhood in Willoughby is promoting the construction of new office buildings in proximity to Highway 1 and 200th Street.

== Climate ==
Climate data for Abbotsford International Airport Climate ID: 1100031; coordinates 49°01′31″N 122°21′36″W; elevation: 243.8 m (800 ft); WMO ID: 71108; 1991–2020 normals, extremes 1944–present
Month	Jan	Feb	Mar	Apr	May	Jun	Jul	Aug	Sep	Oct	Nov	Dec	Year
Record high humidex	18.8	20.0	24.8	31.2	39.5	49.8	46.2	43.4	40.1	31.2	21.0	18.9	49.8
Record high °C (°F)	18.4 (65.1)	20.6 (69.1)	24.9 (76.8)	29.8 (85.6)	36.0 (96.8)	42.9 (109.2)	38.0 (100.4)	39.4 (102.9)	37.5 (99.5)	29.3 (84.7)	22.4 (72.3)	18.2 (64.8)	42.9 (109.2)
Mean maximum °C (°F)	13.1 (55.6)	14.3 (57.7)	18.7 (65.7)	23.4 (74.1)	27.6 (81.7)	29.6 (85.3)	32.5 (90.5)	32.3 (90.1)	29.4 (84.9)	22.3 (72.1)	15.9 (60.6)	12.9 (55.2)	34.2 (93.6)
Mean daily maximum °C (°F)	6.7 (44.1)	8.9 (48.0)	11.4 (52.5)	14.8 (58.6)	18.8 (65.8)	21.0 (69.8)	24.4 (75.9)	24.8 (76.6)	21.4 (70.5)	15.0 (59.0)	9.5 (49.1)	6.3 (43.3)	15.2 (59.4)
Daily mean °C (°F)	3.7 (38.7)	5.1 (41.2)	7.2 (45.0)	10.0 (50.0)	13.6 (56.5)	16.0 (60.8)	18.5 (65.3)	18.7 (65.7)	15.7 (60.3)	10.7 (51.3)	6.2 (43.2)	3.5 (38.3)	10.7 (51.3)
Mean daily minimum °C (°F)	0.6 (33.1)	1.3 (34.3)	2.9 (37.2)	5.2 (41.4)	8.4 (47.1)	10.9 (51.6)	12.7 (54.9)	12.6 (54.7)	9.9 (49.8)	6.4 (43.5)	2.7 (36.9)	0.6 (33.1)	6.2 (43.2)
Mean minimum °C (°F)	−7.5 (18.5)	−4.8 (23.4)	−2.7 (27.1)	0.3 (32.5)	3.1 (37.6)	6.6 (43.9)	8.8 (47.8)	8.5 (47.3)	4.9 (40.8)	0.4 (32.7)	−4.2 (24.4)	−6.6 (20.1)	−10.0 (14.0)
Record low °C (°F)	−21.1 (−6.0)	−18.9 (−2.0)	−12.8 (9.0)	−4.4 (24.1)	−2.2 (28.0)	1.1 (34.0)	2.2 (36.0)	3.3 (37.9)	−1.7 (28.9)	−7.5 (18.5)	−16.7 (1.9)	−20.0 (−4.0)	−21.1 (−6.0)
Record low wind chill	−26.6	−29.6	−19.7	−7.3	−4.0	0.0	0.0	0.0	−5.4	−13.9	−27.6	−33.3	−33.3
Average precipitation mm (inches)	225.6 (8.88)	117.1 (4.61)	145.5 (5.73)	114.4 (4.50)	94.0 (3.70)	69.6 (2.74)	39.2 (1.54)	47.1 (1.85)	77.6 (3.06)	144.4 (5.69)	233.1 (9.18)	197.3 (7.77)	1,504.6 (59.24)
Average rainfall mm (inches)	204.6 (8.06)	109.3 (4.30)	140.4 (5.53)	113.4 (4.46)	94.0 (3.70)	69.6 (2.74)	39.2 (1.54)	47.1 (1.85)	74.0 (2.91)	145.0 (5.71)	224.8 (8.85)	179.8 (7.08)	1,441.1 (56.74)
Average snowfall cm (inches)	22.1 (8.7)	7.2 (2.8)	5.2 (2.0)	0.8 (0.3)	0.0 (0.0)	0.0 (0.0)	0.0 (0.0)	0.0 (0.0)	0.0 (0.0)	0.0 (0.0)	7.1 (2.8)	14.0 (5.5)	56.4 (22.2)
Average precipitation days (≥ 0.2 mm)	20.5	16.2	19.5	16.3	13.4	12.7	7.2	7.1	9.5	15.7	20.3	20.3	178.5
Average rainy days (≥ 0.2 mm)	18.6	15.3	18.6	16.3	13.4	12.7	7.2	7.1	9.1	15.8	19.6	19.0	172.4
Average snowy days (≥ 0.2 cm)	3.9	2.0	1.7	0.42	0.0	0.0	0.0	0.0	0.0	0.0	1.3	2.7	12.0
Average relative humidity (%) (at 3pm)	74.2	63.6	60.4	56.0	55.4	56.4	53.1	52.3	56.8	66.4	74.2	76.0	62.1
Average dew point °C (°F)	0.4 (32.7)	0.2 (32.4)	2.2 (36.0)	4.4 (39.9)	7.7 (45.9)	10.2 (50.4)	12.3 (54.1)	12.4 (54.3)	10.5 (50.9)	6.9 (44.4)	3.2 (37.8)	0.3 (32.5)	5.9 (42.6)
Mean monthly sunshine hours	68.3	99.0	131.5	171.5	208.7	213.7	276.7	263.2	201.9	122.6	64.7	64.9	1,886.7
Percentage possible sunshine	25.2	34.6	35.7	41.8	44.1	44.2	56.7	59.1	53.3	36.5	23.4	25.2	40.0
Source 1: Environment Canada (sun, humidex and wind chill 1981–2010)
Source 2: weatherstats.ca (for dewpoint and monthly&yearly average absolute maximum&minimum temperature)

Climate data for Langley, BC, elevation 100.9m, 1971–2000
Month	Jan	Feb	Mar	Apr	May	Jun	Jul	Aug	Sep	Oct	Nov	Dec	Year
Record high °C (°F)	15 (59)	18.5 (65.3)	20 (68)	24.4 (75.9)	34 (93)	32.2 (90.0)	35.6 (96.1)	36.1 (97.0)	33.3 (91.9)	27.5 (81.5)	19 (66)	16.1 (61.0)	36.1 (97.0)
Mean daily maximum °C (°F)	5 (41)	7.6 (45.7)	10.5 (50.9)	13.3 (55.9)	16.8 (62.2)	19.3 (66.7)	22.6 (72.7)	22.8 (73.0)	19.6 (67.3)	14.1 (57.4)	8.1 (46.6)	5.3 (41.5)	13.8 (56.7)
Mean daily minimum °C (°F)	−0.6 (30.9)	1.2 (34.2)	2.2 (36.0)	3.8 (38.8)	6.7 (44.1)	9.2 (48.6)	10.8 (51.4)	11.1 (52.0)	8.8 (47.8)	5.6 (42.1)	2.1 (35.8)	0.1 (32.2)	5.1 (41.2)
Record low °C (°F)	−17.5 (0.5)	−16 (3)	−8 (18)	−3 (27)	−0.4 (31.3)	1.7 (35.1)	3.9 (39.0)	3.3 (37.9)	−0.4 (31.3)	−3 (27)	−16 (3)	−19.4 (−2.9)	−19.4 (−2.9)
Average precipitation mm (inches)	153 (6.0)	156.4 (6.16)	131.4 (5.17)	102.1 (4.02)	82.8 (3.26)	72.9 (2.87)	52.7 (2.07)	56.4 (2.22)	76.4 (3.01)	140.7 (5.54)	200.8 (7.91)	193.4 (7.61)	1,419 (55.84)
Source: National Climate Data and Information Archive (Langley Lochiel Weather Station)

== Culture ==
=== Suburban ===
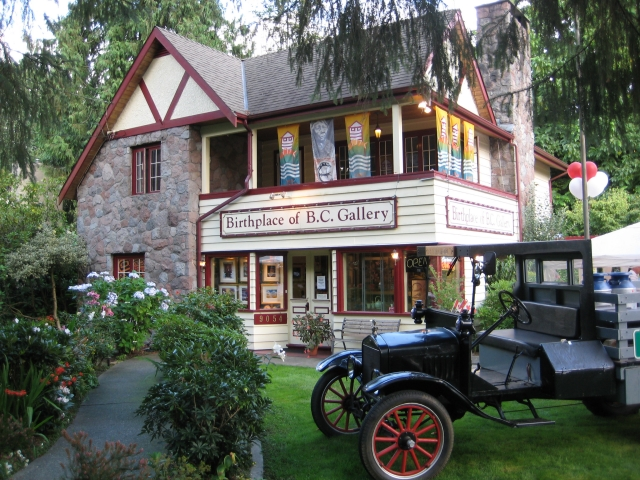
Birthplace of BC Gallery in Fort Langley

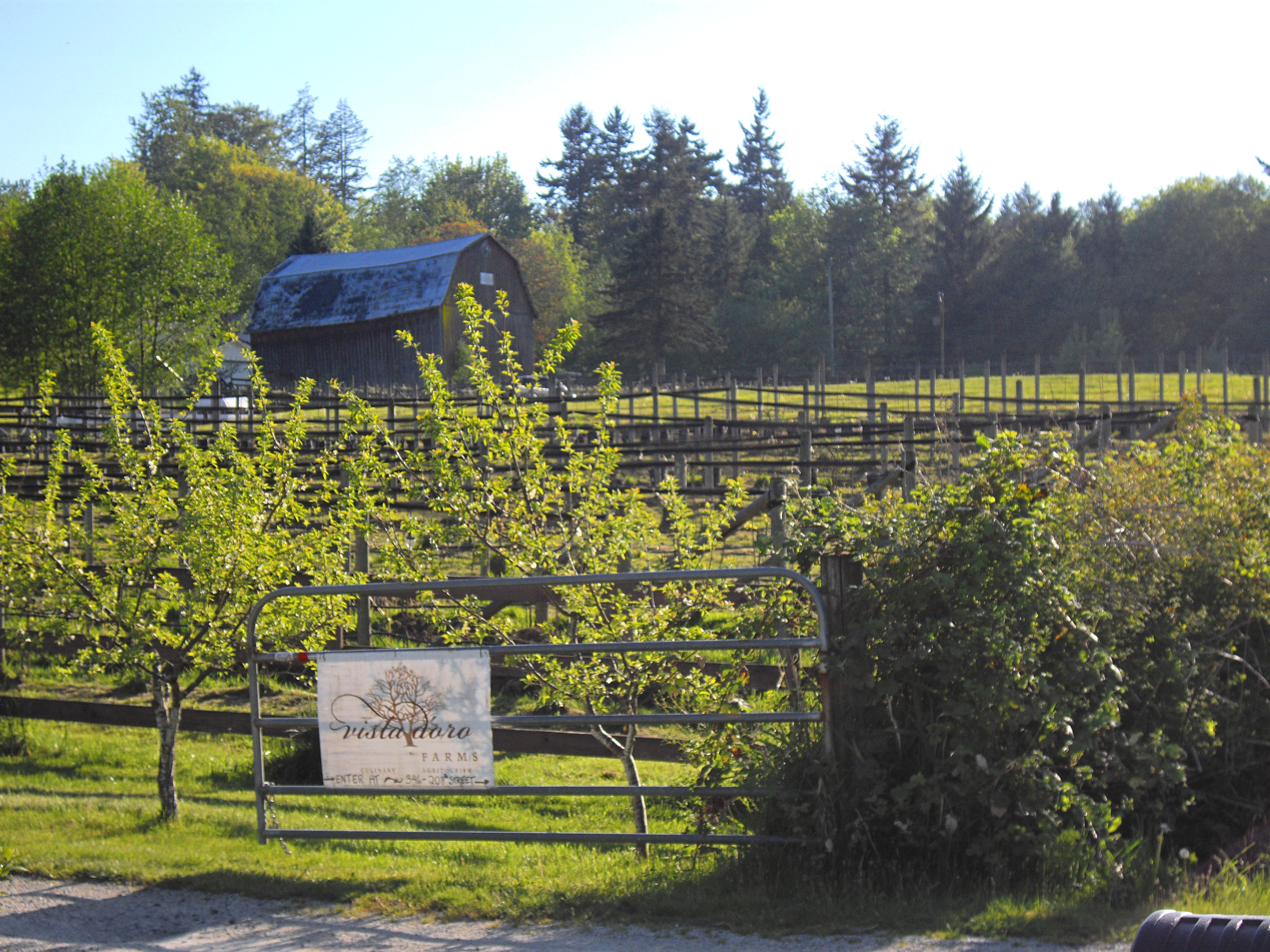
Vista D'oro winery in South Langley

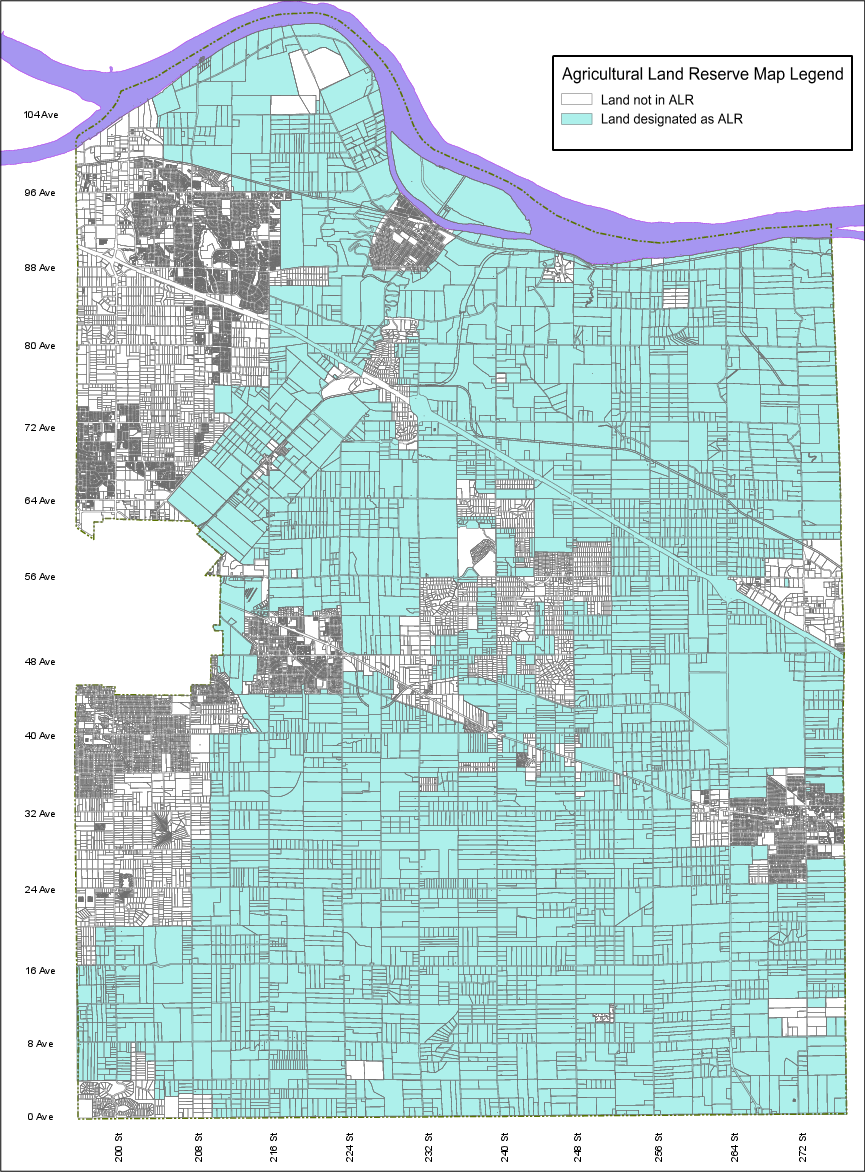
The majority of the land in the Langley Township is designated as part of the Agricultural Land Reserve (ALR), shown as light blue on this map. This restricts the way the land can be used. The ALR was introduced in 1973 to preserve fertile land and support local farming.

The Township of Langley is largely a suburban community, but, while the centre is increasingly urban, the periphery (particularly in the south and southeast) maintains its agricultural nature. The neighbourhoods of Willoughby and Walnut Grove are quite suburban and feature large numbers of big-box stores, the Willowbrook Shopping Centre, and the Famous Players Colossus Theatre Complex.

=== Historic ===
Fort Langley has the distinguished title of being "The Birthplace of British Columbia". The Fort Langley National Historic Site, which puts on events and exhibits relevant to the history of the area, is open to the public. Additionally, the village itself has areas of historical interest.

Elsewhere in Langley is the Twilight Drive-in – a drive-in movie theatre, the Canadian Museum of Flight, numerous parks, rivers, and horse farms. The Otter Co-op is a major commercial and agricultural centre for the community of Aldergrove.

In South Langley is Campbell Valley Regional Park, a large Metro Vancouver Regional Park. Within the park boundaries are the historic Rowlatt Farmstead, clearly visible logging railway grades, and the historic Lochiel Schoolhouse.

=== Produce ===
==== Wine ====
Langley takes part in British Columbia's wine-making tradition and has many wineries with a temperate climate which allow grapes to grow. This includes places such as the Fort Wine Co. in Fort Langley, and Vista D'oro winery in the south, both of which have produced award-winning wines, with the latter reaching international acclaim at the Shanghai International Wine Competition 2012.

==== Other ====
In the agricultural areas of Langley, farms produce a variety of fruits and vegetables, meat, dairy and eggs. It is not unusual to see signs on the roadside advertising fresh produce sold direct from the farm. The Langley Circle Farm Tour is a popular way for tourists to experience the various farms and see what Langley produces.

Alpacas are farmed in Langley, Kensington Prairie Farm retails an array of specialized alpaca products including rovings, yarn, socks, toques, mitts, scarves, shawls, apparel and housewares.

=== Arts & sports ===
Langley is home to the Langley Rugby Club of the British Columbia Rugby Union, Vancouver Giants of the Western Hockey League, the Vancouver Bandits of the Canadian Elite Basketball League, the Langley Rivermen of the British Columbia Hockey League, the Langley Rams of the British Columbia Conference of the Canadian Junior Football League who are based at the MacLeod Stadium, the Langley Blaze of the PBL Premier Baseball League and the Trinity Western University Spartans in Canadian Interuniversity Sport.

In 2023, Vancouver FC from Langley debuted in the Canadian Premier League.

There are several ice rinks in town, including the George Preston Centre in Brookswood, the Sportsplex in Walnut Grove, and the Aldergrove arena.There are public swimming pools located at the Walnut Grove Community Centre, the W.C. Blair Recreation Centre in Murrayville, and the Fort Langley Outdoor Pool. The Al Anderson Memorial Pool is also nearby in Langley City.

The Langley Ukulele Ensemble is one of the more noteworthy cultural acts to be based out of the district.

Club	League	Sport	Venue	Established	Status
Vancouver Stealth	NLL	Box lacrosse	Langley Events Centre	2014	Defunct
Vancouver Bandits	CEBL	Basketball	Langley Events Centre	2019	Active
Unity FC	L1BC	Soccer	Chase Office Field	2022	Active
Vancouver Giants	WHL	Ice hockey	Langley Events Centre	2001	Active
Langley Rivermen	BCHL	Ice hockey	George Preston Recreation Centre	2011	Active
Langley Trappers	PJHL	Ice hockey	George Preston Recreation Centre	2017	Active
Aldergrove Kodiaks	PJHL	Ice hockey	Aldergrove Credit Union Community Centre	2008	Active
Valley West Giants	BCMML	Ice hockey	Langley Events Centre	2006	Active
Langley Rams	CJFL	Canadian football	McLeod Athletic Park	2010	Active
Langley Thunder	WLA	Box lacrosse	Langley Events Centre	1994	Active
Langley Warriors	WCSLA	Box lacrosse	Aldergrove Credit Union Community Centre	2009	Active
Langley Blaze	BCPBL	Baseball	McLeod Athletic Park	1993	Active
Vancouver FC	CPL	Soccer	Willoughby Community Park Stadium	2023	Active

=== Equine ===
With a local equine industry valued at over $60 million annually, the Township of Langley has become the Horse Capital of BC. As of 2006, Langley farms represented 7.2% of the provincial total of horses and ponies.

== Transportation ==
=== Road network ===
==== Streets and avenues ====
0 Avenue is along the U.S. border, and avenue numbers are incremented based on eight per mile (1.6 km), so for example 80 Avenue would be 10 miles (16 km) from the border. Street numbers also increment eight per mile as they go further east. There are roads that break this system such as Fraser Highway, Glover Road and Old Yale Road, because they existed before the grid system was introduced.

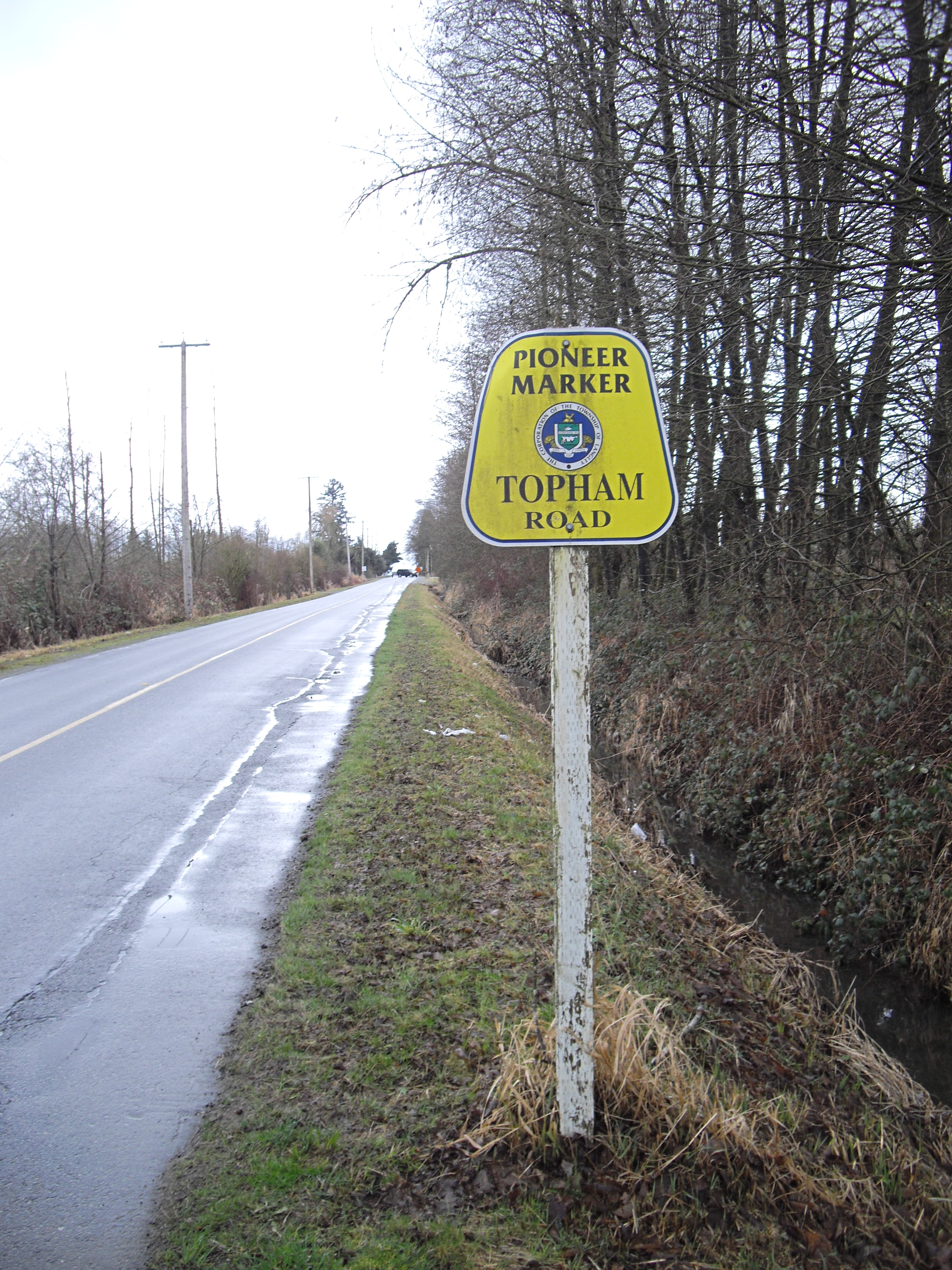
Township of Langley Pioneer Marker for Topham Road on 216th St

Many of the old road names have been replaced with numeric designations, however Heritage and Pioneer markers installed by the council are placed on many of the roads to highlight their original name.

==== Trans-Canada Highway ====
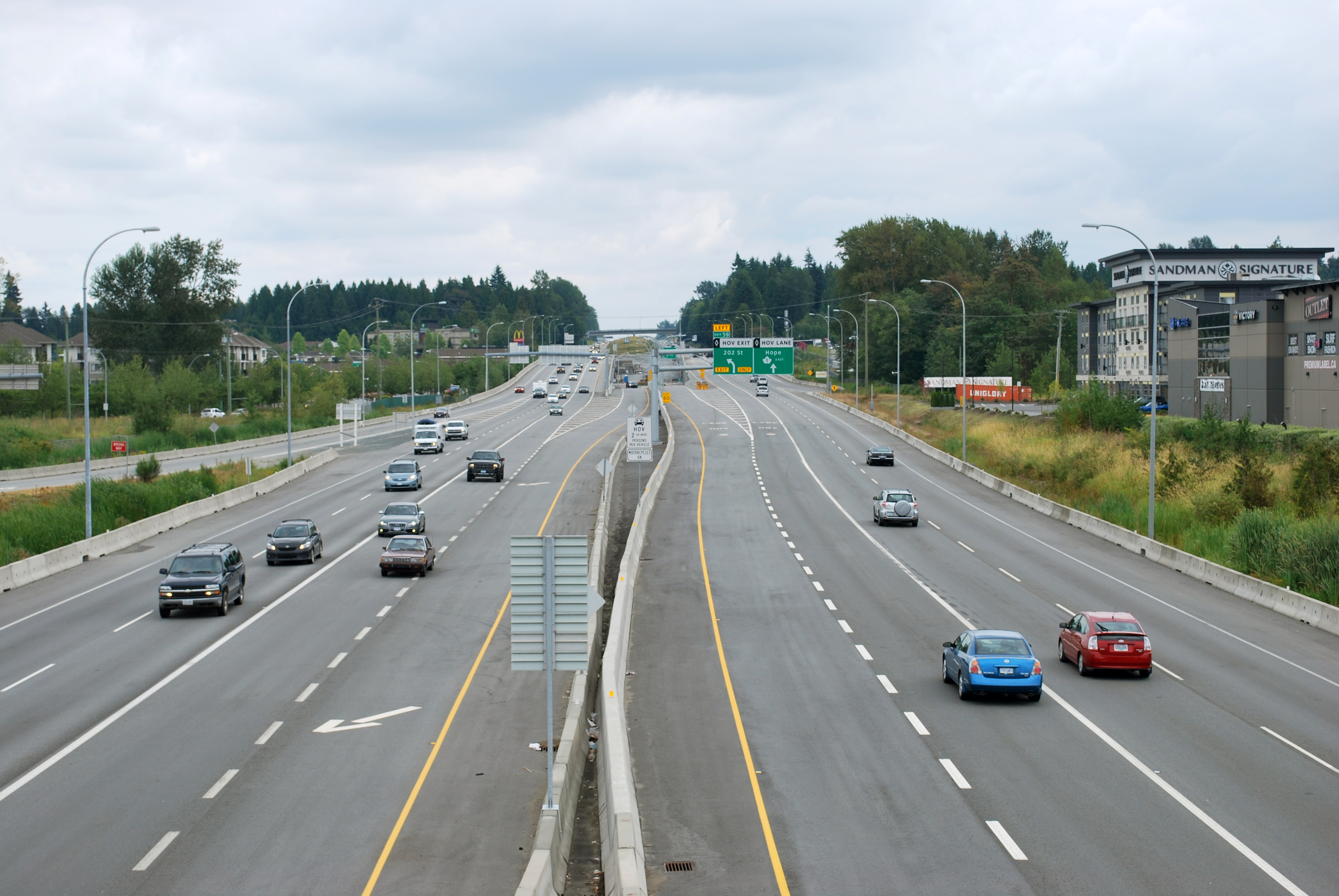
Trans-Canada Highway in Langley

Highway 1, also known as the Trans-Canada Highway, cuts through the northern part of Langley. The Walnut Grove and Willoughby communities are popular with commuters due to being the most developed areas with the easiest access to the highway.

By road, the highway is the fastest method of reaching Vancouver and all the cities along the route, such as Surrey, Coquitlam, New Westminster and Burnaby. Depending on the traffic volume it can take between 25 and 35 minutes to enter Vancouver city limits. For reaching Downtown Vancouver, drivers can exit at Hastings Street and continue westbound into the downtown core.

In 2012, upgrades to the highway in the Langley and Surrey region have widened the highway by two lanes in each direction – one new HOV lane and one new regular lane – which has reduced traffic congestion. In addition to this there are HOV exits which provide direct access into the communities for Buses, Motorcycles and Cars with more than one occupant.

Regional District	Location	km	mi	Exit	Destinations	Notes
Metro Vancouver	Langley Township	58.71	36.48	58	200 Street – Golden Ears Bridge	Single-point/diamond interchange. Access to the Golden Ears Bridge
Metro Vancouver	Langley Township			59	202 Street	Single-point HOV-only interchange (left exit)
Metro Vancouver	Langley Township			61	216 Street	Diamond interchange. Opened in 2020.
Metro Vancouver	Langley Township	65.73	40.84	66	Highway 10 west (232nd Street) – Langley, Fort Langley	Partial cloverleaf interchange.
Metro Vancouver	Langley Township	73.25	45.52	73	Highway 13 south (Aldergrove-Bellingham Highway/264th Street) – Aldergrove, Bellingham, WA; 56th Avenue	Partial cloverleaf interchange.
1.000 mi = 1.609 km; 1.000 km = 0.621 mi: Concurrency terminus; HOV only; Incomplete access; Tolled

In addition to the five interchanges, three vehicle overpasses – at 208th Street, Glover Road and 248th Street – cross over the highway. An overpass carries rail traffic exclusively a few hundred metres east of Glover Road.

==== Fraser Highway ====
Fraser Highway used to be part of the Trans-Canada Highway but was replaced in 1964. It is a major road that runs from the centre of Surrey, through Cloverdale, the City of Langley, Murrayville and continues on to Abbotsford. While the speed limit between Langley and Abbotsford qualifies as highway speed at 80 km/h, between Langley and Surrey the speed limit is primarily 60 km/h with the route having frequent traffic lights. This usually means longer travel time than using Highway 1 to reach Surrey City Centre. However, since Fraser Highway goes directly between urban centres, it remains a popular route.

==== 200 Street ====
200 is the longest street that runs through Langley and is a major traffic artery. It starts at 0 Avenue at the U.S. Border (as Carvolth Road), up through Brookswood, into the City of Langley centre, and continues north through Walnut Grove to the Golden Ears Bridge which leads into Pitt Meadows and Maple Ridge across the Fraser River.

=== United States border ===
Langley is situated directly north of and along the United States border, with Washington state to the south. The northernmost point in Langley is less than 25 kilometres (16 mi) from the border. Langley contains one of the five Lower Mainland border crossings in the community of Aldergrove; however, British Columbia Highway 15, which is only 3.5 kilometres (2.2 mi) to the west of Langley in Surrey, leads to the larger Pacific Highway Crossing. Crossing the border here is often faster due to having more open crossing lanes including NEXUS lanes which offer faster crossings for those opted into the NEXUS program.

=== Bus services ===
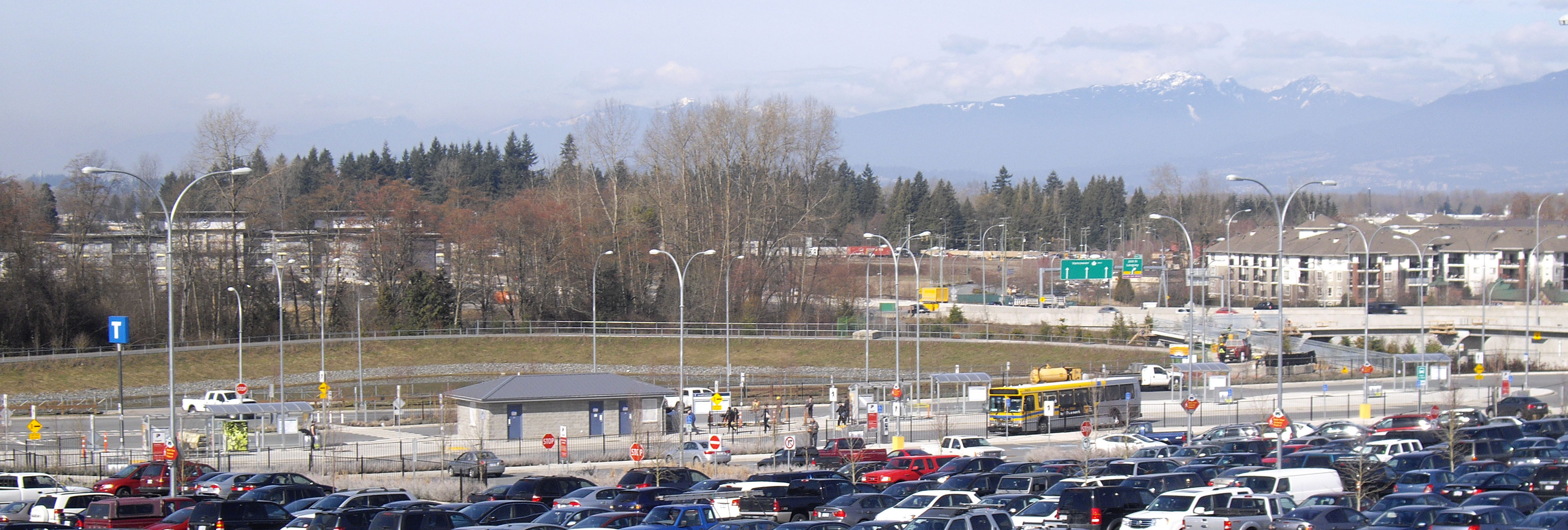
Carvolth Exchange Park and Ride

The region is served by TransLink which provides bus services connecting Langley to its neighbouring cities. The largest transit hub in the Township of Langley is Carvolth Exchange – a bus terminal with a park and ride situated next to the Trans-Canada Highway on 202nd Street which provides service to various parts of Langley and the Lower Mainland. Notable is the #555 service, an express bus that connects Langley to Lougheed Town Centre station in Burnaby crossing the Port Mann Bridge. This route uses the HOV interchanges on the highway, stopping at Surrey (via the 156th Street HOV interchange) and using the Government Street and 202nd Street HOV interchanges to leave and exit the highway.

=== Rail services ===
==== SkyTrain ====
The SkyTrain rapid transit system is due to be extended to Langley by 2029. Two Skytrain stations are planned for Langley, one at the border between Surrey and the Township of Langley at 196 Street, and another in the City of Langley at 203 Street.

==== Passenger service ====
The community group South Fraser Community Rail have been campaigning for TransLink to run passenger trains along existing railway tracks through the Fraser Valley from Surrey, through Langley to Chilliwack. The tracks were previously used for the BCER Interurban in the early 20th century but are maintained and in use today for freight rail traffic with passenger rail right-of-way. If implemented, this could potentially include stops at Fort Langley and Milner.

==== Freight ====
The city is served by four railways: Canadian National Railway (CN), Canadian Pacific Railway (CP), Burlington Northern and Santa Fe (BNSF), and the shortline Southern Railway of British Columbia (SRY).

=== Airports ===
CYNJ Langley is serviced by Langley Regional Airport, a small controlled airport with no scheduled service. Harbour Air, the largest float-carrier in the world, formerly served Langley with scheduled service but terminated these flights due to low passenger numbers in 2011. The Langley Airport is also home to the Canadian Museum of Flight, as well as SkyQuest Aviation and Standard Aero, a helicopter maintenance and modification contractor. It features 2 runways with a maximum length of 2743 feet and 2 helipads. In 2018 Langley airport had 75,954 movements

CBQ2 Fort Langley airport is a private airport located in north Langley adjacent to the Fraser River. It has a single 5510 foot runway and float plane access to the river.

== Communities and neighbourhoods ==
These are the communities and neighbourhoods recognized by the Township of Langley. For a list of all communities, see Neighbourhoods in Langley, British Columbia.

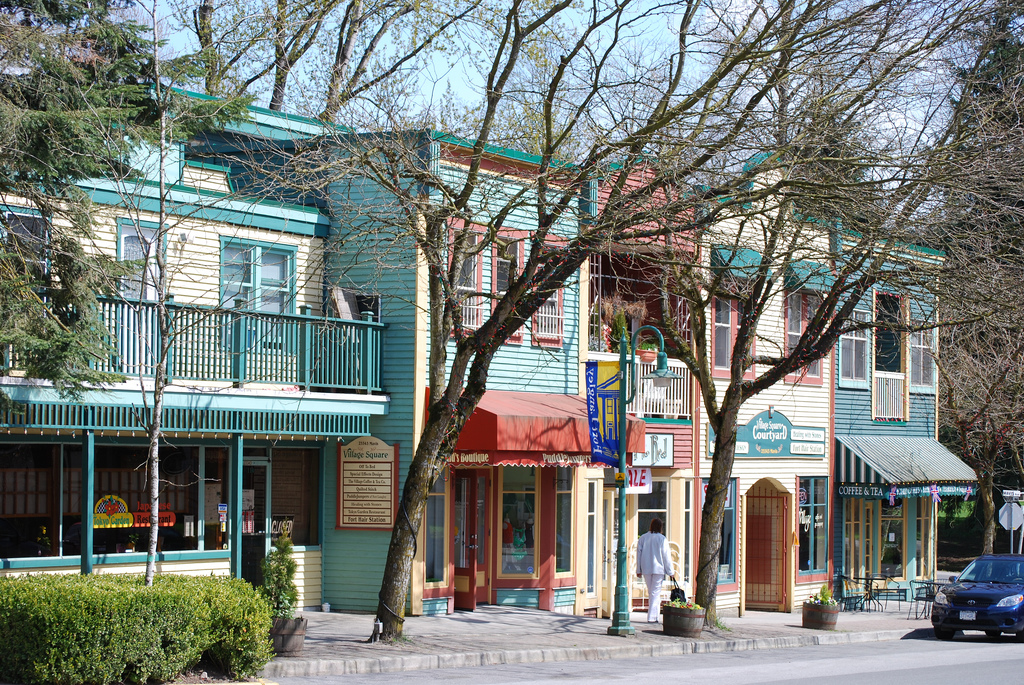
Restored colonial buildings in Downtown Fort Langley

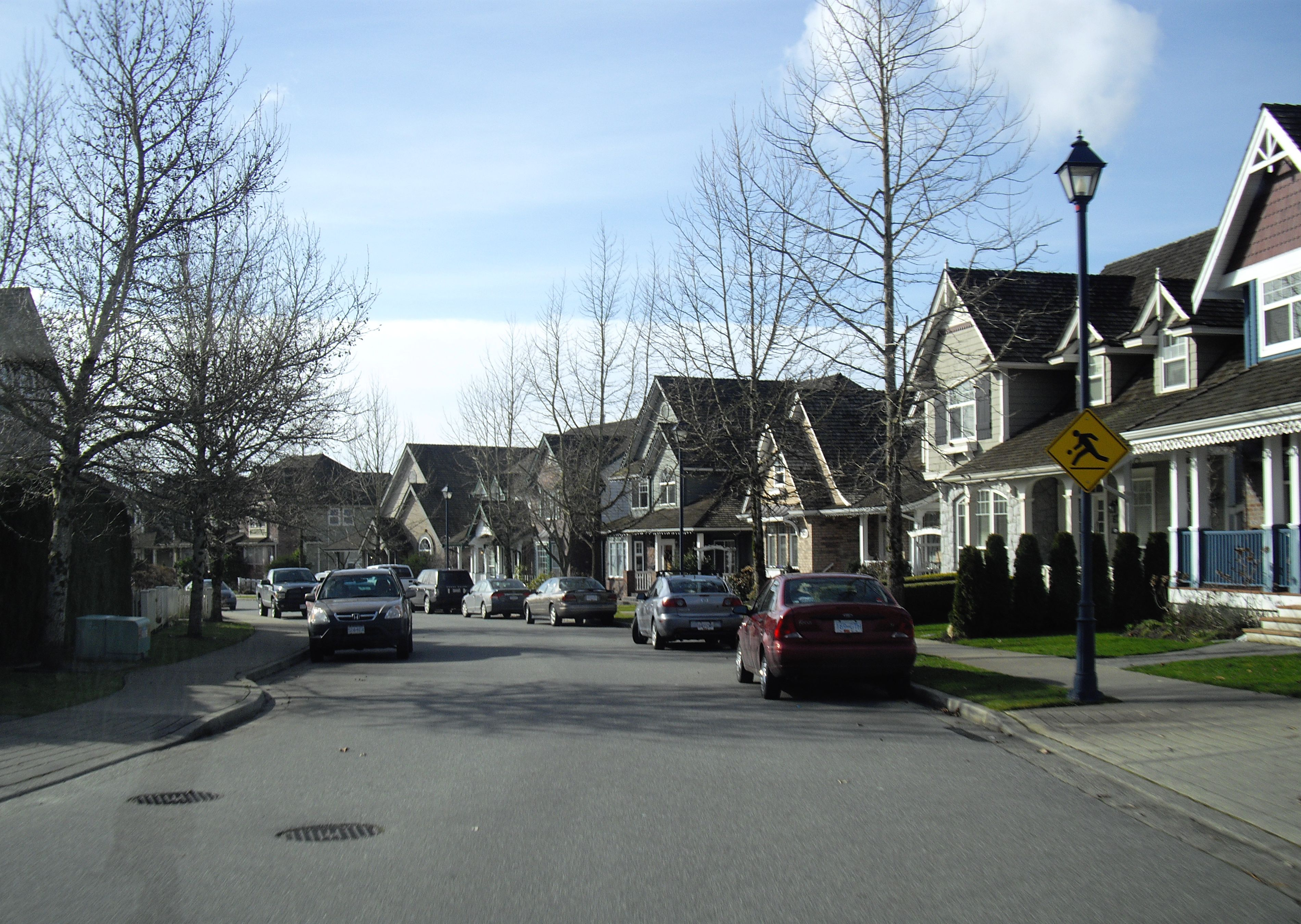
Murray's Crescent in Murrayville

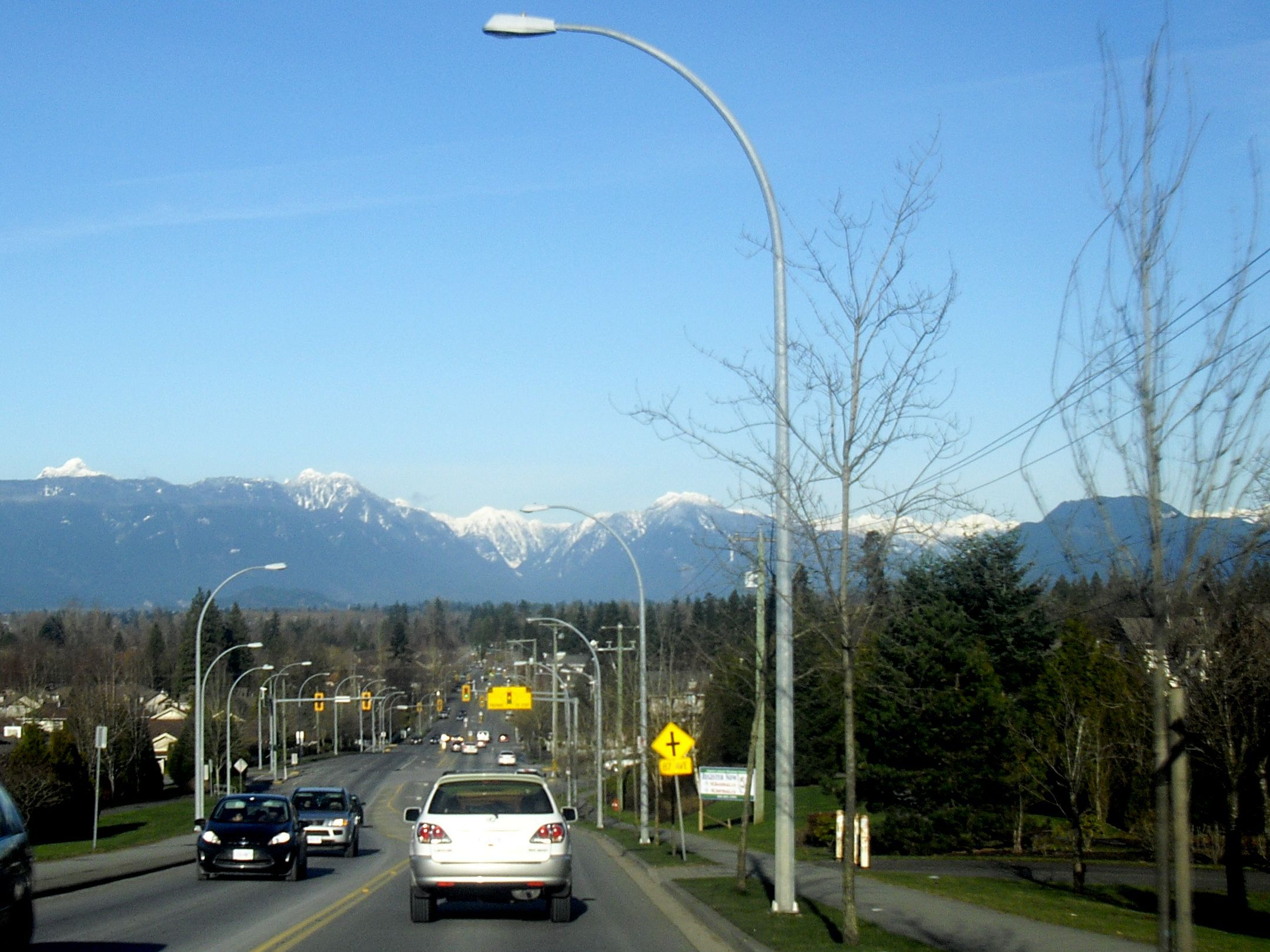
The Coast Mountains are clearly visible from Walnut Grove and Willoughby, in addition to other parts of Langley

=== Aldergrove ===
Aldergrove is a small community centred on Fraser Highway. It is home to the Greater Vancouver Zoo and the Aldergrove Regional Park.

=== Brookswood ===
Brookswood is a community to the south of the City of Langley. It is a mostly residential area, with Brookswood Village on 200th Street and 40th Avenue featuring independent stores as well as larger chains.

=== Fernridge ===
The small neighbourhood of Fernridge used to be a farming area. It is now a small centre with two gas stations, a grocery store and a pub. This is the location of Campbell Valley Regional Park.

=== Fort Langley ===
Fort Langley is a historically significant community in Langley, located in the north of the district municipality. Originally a trading post for the Hudson's Bay Company, today it is a small village with restored colonial style buildings dating to the late 19th and early 20th centuries. Glover Road, being the main road that runs through the village, is notable in the area for having large tree lined streets and being home to many small independent businesses in the village centre.

=== Milner ===
Milner is located along Glover Road towards Fort Langley, and along the British Columbia Electric Railway. Originally where the Hudson Bay Farm was located. It features areas of historical interest, such as the Milner Chapel and hall, dedicated on May 23, 1886. Another prominent historical structure is the barn located on Glover Road that is occupied by Milner Feed & Pet Supply. Built in 1906, it has been a staple of Langley's agriculture community selling farm supplies and equipment. It now sells a wide variety of pet food & supplies, hay and feed.

=== Murrayville ===
Murrayville is another historically significant community in Langley, being founded in 1870 by Paul Murray as "Murrays Corner". It is notable in the area for its older buildings and a 5 road roundabout in the centre that intersects Old Yale Road with the historic Porters general store to the East. Residential property there is typically on larger lots than in some of the newer developed parts of Langley. It is also the location of Langley Memorial Hospital which serves the city.

=== Willoughby ===
Located in the north of the district and south of the Trans-Canada Highway, Willoughby is a mixture of new developments, and undeveloped rural land. At the centre of Willoughby is the new Willoughby Town Centre development. It is also the location of the Langley Events Centre.

=== Walnut Grove ===
Walnut Grove is located north of Willoughby and the Trans-Canada Highway, and west of Fort Langley. It is a more established developed area, with many supermarkets and shops, and easy access to the highway making it desirable for commuters.

== Government ==
The Township of Langley is administered by an eight-member council and a mayor. All members of council are elected to four-year terms in elections that take place in late November.

== Demographics ==
In the 2021 Census of Population conducted by Statistics Canada, Langley had a population of 132,603 living in 46,928 of its 49,011 total private dwellings, a change of 13.1% from its 2016 population of 117,285. With a land area of 307.22 km^{2} (118.62 sq mi), it had a population density of 431.6/km^{2} (1,117.9/sq mi) in 2021.

=== Ethnicity ===
Largest non-English ethnic origin in Langley (district municipality & city) by census tract based on the 2021 census

The largest ethnicities in Langley (district municipality & city) as per the 2021 census are English (24.7%), Scottish (17.7%), German (13.6%), Irish (13.6%), Dutch (6.8%), French (6.2%), Ukrainian (5.3%), and Chinese (4.8%).

Panethnic groups in the Township of Langley (2001−2021)
Panethnic group	2021		2016		2011		2006		2001	
Panethnic group	Pop.	%	Pop.	%	Pop.	%	Pop.	%	Pop.	%
European (Note: Statistic includes all persons that did not make up part of a visible minority or an aboriginal identity.)	91,055	69.53%	89,920	77.63%	85,840	83.23%	81,310	87.39%	78,195	90.69%
East Asian (Note: Statistic includes total responses of "Chinese", "Korean", and "Japanese" under visible minority section on census.)	14,330	10.94%	9,255	7.99%	6,470	6.27%	4,820	5.18%	3,000	3.48%
South Asian	8,720	6.66%	5,140	4.44%	2,765	2.68%	1,445	1.55%	1,485	1.72%
Southeast Asian (Note: Statistic includes total responses of "Filipino" and "Southeast Asian" under visible minority section on census.)	5,435	4.15%	3,515	3.03%	2,455	2.38%	1,475	1.59%	905	1.05%
Indigenous	5,045	3.85%	4,310	3.72%	3,495	3.39%	2,450	2.63%	1,950	2.26%
Latin American	1,715	1.31%	1,100	0.95%	650	0.63%	395	0.42%	190	0.22%
African	1,450	1.11%	1,205	1.04%	470	0.46%	575	0.62%	275	0.32%
Middle Eastern (Note: Statistic includes total responses of "West Asian" and "Arab" under visible minority section on census.)	1,440	1.1%	715	0.62%	410	0.4%	295	0.32%	60	0.07%
Other/multiracial (Note: Statistic includes total responses of "Visible minority, n.i.e." and "Multiple visible minorities" under visible minority section on census.)	1,770	1.35%	680	0.59%	600	0.58%	280	0.3%	170	0.2%
Total responses	130,960	98.76%	115,835	98.76%	103,140	99%	93,040	99.27%	86,220	99.22%
Total population	132,603	100%	117,285	100%	104,177	100%	93,726	100%	86,896	100%
Note: Totals greater than 100% due to multiple origin responses

=== Religion ===
According to the 2021 census, religious groups in Langley included:

- Irreligion (64,545 persons or 49.3%)
- Christianity (55,265 persons or 42.2%)
- Sikhism (5,170 persons or 3.9%)
- Islam (1,890 persons or 1.4%)
- Buddhism (1,765 persons or 1.3%)
- Hinduism (1,225 persons or 0.9%)
- Judaism (290 persons or 0.2%)
- Indigenous spirituality (65 persons or <0.1%)

Religious groups in the Township of Langley (1991−2021)
Religious group	2021 Canadian census		2011 Canadian census		2001 Canadian census		1991 Canadian census	
Religious group	Pop.	%	Pop.	%	Pop.	%	Pop.	%
Christianity	55,265	42.2%	54,550	52.89%	53,850	62.46%	45,005	68.57%
Irreligion	64,545	49.29%	43,680	42.35%	29,770	34.53%	19,755	30.1%
Sikhism	5,170	3.95%	1,965	1.91%	1,055	1.22%	300	0.46%
Islam	1,890	1.44%	575	0.56%	130	0.15%	65	0.1%
Buddhism	1,765	1.35%	1,445	1.4%	825	0.96%	260	0.4%
Hinduism	1,225	0.94%	215	0.21%	110	0.13%	40	0.06%
Judaism	290	0.22%	170	0.16%	240	0.28%	85	0.13%
Indigenous spirituality	65	0.05%	0	0%	0	0%	—N/a	—N/a
Other	745	0.57%	530	0.51%	235	0.27%	110	0.17%
Total responses	130,960	98.76%	103,140	99%	86,220	99.22%	65,635	99.39%
Total population	132,603	100%	104,177	100%	86,896	100%	66,040	100%

== Notable people ==
- Ken Anderlini (1962–2007), filmmaker, educator and activist
