= Anderlini =

Anderlini is an Italian surname. Notable people with the surname include:

- Franco Anderlini (1921–1984), Italian volleyball coach
- Ken Anderlini (1962–2007), Canadian film director
- Nino Anderlini (1926–2004), Italian cross-country skier
- Pietro Anderlini (1687–1755), Italian painter
