= Milner, British Columbia =

Coordinates: 49°08′00″N 122°37′00″W

Milner
- Neighbourhood
- Interactive map of Milner
- Country: Canada
- Province: British Columbia
- Region: Lower Mainland
- Regional district: Greater Vancouver
- District Municipality: Langley, British Columbia (district municipality)
- Time zone: UTC-8 (Pacific (PST))
  - Summer (DST): UTC-7 (PDT)
- Area code: 604

Milner is a rural village (small town) and locality in the Township of Langley in the Fraser Valley of British Columbia, Canada. It is located along the British Columbia Electric Railway line (now the Southern Railway of B.C.) northeast of the City of Langley and just southwest of Fort Langley.

An agricultural hall and fairground were built in Milner in 1918. The village had a stop on the Fraser Valley Branch (New Westminster–Chilliwack) of the British Columbia Electric Railway inter-urban line until 1950.

== Milner Chapel ==
Milner Methodist Church, founded in 1885, was dedicated in April 1886 as Langley Prairie Methodist Church but soon became known as Milner Methodist Church. Following the church union in 1925, it was renamed Milner United Church. Over the years, Milner United Church was part of several pastoral charges, including Langley-Milner, Langley, Murrayville-Fort Langley, and Fort Langley-Milner. In May 1990, preliminary discussions began about the merger of Milner United Church with St. Andrew's United Church. On September 16, 1990, the congregation approved an amalgamation report. Consequently, morning services at Milner United Church ceased at the end of September 1990. Beginning November 24, 1990, an evening service was held on the fourth Sunday of each month. Effective January 1, 1991, the Milner United Church congregation, part of the Fort Langley-Milner pastoral charge, merged with St. Andrew's United Church congregation. The Milner property was subsequently sold, and the new one-point pastoral charge was designated as St. Andrew's-Fort Langley Pastoral Charge.
