= Ken Anderlini =

Canadian filmmaker, educator, and gay activist

Kenneth Robert Anderlini (September 11, 1962 – April 16, 2007) was an avant-garde Canadian filmmaker, educator and gay activist. Born in Langley, British Columbia, Canada September 11, 1962, his family was in the dairy farming business. His love of learning and art led him to pursue studying art history and film.

Dealing with themes of identity, representation, and desire, his films were widely shown in both gay and academic festival contexts. His films were experimental and highly poetic in form, but more often than not included documentary characteristics (didactic tone, prosaic voiceovers). He was a lecturer on the topic of Art and Culture Studies at Simon Fraser University's School for the Contemporary Arts, and was an active member of Vancouver's contemporary film and art community.

By the time Anderlini left his teaching position at SFU in 2002, his health was suffering, and making time for self care was, in addition to pursuing a Ph.D., part of the reason for his departure. Anderlini was HIV positive by this time, but soon began to develop neurological issues of unknown origin (attributed to AIDS), which eventually led to his declining health, returning to live with his family on their dairy farm, and eventual death at the age of 45.

== Education ==
Anderlini held a B.A. in History from the University of British Columbia and a Masters in film from Simon Fraser University. He had returned to study at UBC in the early 2000s and was a year away from completing a Ph.D. in Art History at the University of British Columbia when he died.

== Filmography ==
=== Director ===
- Threnody: A Wailing Song For Carl (20 min, 1991)
- Tangled Garden, Act I, Scene II (12 min. 1993)
- Tangled Garden, Act II, Scene II (13:20 min. 1993)
- Between You and Me (Tangled Garden, Act III, Scene I) (10 min. 1994); included in the compilation "Queers on the verge: experimental works for educational environments."
- Hose (9 min. 1999)

=== Collaborator ===
- Wankers Co-created with Winston Xin through a grant from the Canadian Council for the Arts, the project focused on the topic of public sexual encounters among gay males. Material from the interview was also incorporated into "The Gay Spirit", a slide show history of gay Vancouver by David Myers. Part of the 2002 interview with Gordon Mlazgar for Wankers, with Anderlini and Xin can be viewed on YouTube; Anderlini's voice can be heard at the very beginning of the video asking the first question to Mlazgar (as well as subsequently). It's unknown whether the project was completed.

=== Art direction ===
- Marlboro City (22.5 min. 1992)

== Academic career ==
Anderlini was a popular, though also at times controversial lecturer, and taught at several universities and colleges in British Columbia, including Douglas College, Emily Carr, UVic. and U.B.C. as well as at S.F.U.

During his years teaching at Simon Fraser University in the 1990s and into the early 2000s, he was notorious for teaching the introductory contemporary art theory class FPA 111 "Issues in the Fine and Performing Arts", which was taken by virtually all students undertaking majors or minors in contemporary arts. The course material was disturbing to some, as Anderlini introduced students to various well known contemporary artists, including dance, film, music, visual arts, and performance and body art, often showing shocking examples, such as videos of some of Chris Burden's body art performances. Anderlini also frequently taught intensive senior level interdisciplinary art theory courses at the school.

Despite being passionate about interdisciplinary and contemporary art, he had many criticisms towards SFU's School for Contemporary Arts, much of it tied to insufficient funding, and delayed promises for new arts facilities on campus.

== Activism and volunteerism ==
=== Independent and queer film ===
Anderlini was a great proponent of independent film, particularly Canadian film, and film on contemporary gay and body politics. He participated in the Vancouver International Film Festival for the better part of a decade in various capacities, including as programmer of the Canadian Images section of the VIFF. He was also involved in other film organizations and festivals in Vancouver, including as a curator for Out On Screen Film and Video Festival, and as a programmer at Video In Studios (now VIVO Media Arts Centre).

=== HIV/AIDS denialism ===
Anderlini moderated a website and forum called "AIDS Myth Exposed", and was known as an AIDS denialist. He co-authored a rebuttal to what is known as "The Gallo Document" and openly criticized and questioned the use of antiretroviral drugs in people who are HIV positive.

Anderlini's death was attributed to AIDS, but there were allegedly some questions and doubts regarding whether his neurological condition was appropriately diagnosed and adequately treated, because of its being attributed to the disease.

== Jersey dairy cattle and horticulture ==
As Anderlini was part of a family of dairy cattle farmers, he maintained an interest in Jersey cattle breeding and organic gardening, as it reads in his obituary:

"Ken was also a devoted fan of the Jersey cow and remained closely involved in the breeding of the registered cattle at his family's farm, Valtallina Jerseys. He had an extensive knowledge of the history of Jerseys in Canada and could recite a cow's pedigree for many generations. He also enjoyed organic horticulture, growing his own vegetables and fruit as well as carefully developing a beautiful flower garden as a lasting legacy."

The Jersey cow, and an exploration of its breeding history are part of the topic matter covered in Anderlini's film, Tangled Garden, Act I Scene II.

== Writings ==
- DAMP: Contemporary Vancouver Media Art (Anvil Press, 2008)
- Christian Fiala, David Crow, David Rasnick, Etienne de Harven, Henry Bauer, Ken Anderlini, Kevin Corbett, Martin Maloney, and Robert Houston "Correcting Gallo: Rethinking AIDS Responds to Harper's 'Out of Control' Critics". Rethinking AIDS. Version 1.4.1: September 27, 2006
- ~Scope (Western Front, 1999)
- Anderlini, Ken (Autumn 1996). "Hard core logo". Take One. 5 (13). Archived from the original on May 15, 2006 – via FindArticles.
