= British Columbia Highway 13 =

Highway in British Columbia, Canada

Highway 13
- 264th Street; Aldergrove-Bellingham Highway
- Highway 13 highlighted in red

Route information
- Maintained by the Ministry of Transportation and Infrastructure
- Length: 11.50 km (7.15 mi)
- Existed: 1953–present

Major junctions
- South end: SR 539 at the U.S. border near Aldergrove
- North end: Highway 1 (TCH) in Langley

Location
- Country: Canada
- Province: British Columbia

Highway system
- British Columbia provincial highways
| ← Highway 12 | → Highway 14 |

Highway 13 is an 11.5 km (7.1 mi) long two-lane route through the eastern part of Langley, British Columbia. Highway 13 connects Washington state (via Washington State Route 539) to the central Fraser Valley.

== Route description ==
Highway 13 begins at the Lynden–Aldergrove Border Crossing on the United States border as a continuation of Washington State Route 539, which travels south to Bellingham, Washington. The four-lane undivided highway briefly runs northwest before turning onto 264 Street, which it follows due north for 11.5 kilometres (7.1 mi) through a rural area of the Fraser Valley. Highway 13 then travels through the western outskirts of Aldergrove, a residential area within Langley Township, where it intersects the Fraser Highway. The highway continues north, passing Naval Radio Section Aldergrove and the Greater Vancouver Zoo, before reaching its northern terminus at an interchange with Highway 1 (part of the Trans-Canada Highway).

== History ==
Historically, segments of Highway 13 were referred to as Townline, County Line and Howes roads. In 1932, the highway was selected as a "second artery" to connect Yale Road to the U.S. border. and was designated an arterial highway. The official title of "Aldergrove-Bellingham Highway" came with the arterial designation.

In regard to the highway's number. The number 13 was assigned around 1953 to the road between the Lynden–Aldergrove Border Crossing and the present day Fraser Highway (former Highway 1A). The designation was pushed north to Highway 401, the new freeway alignment of the Trans-Canada Highway, by 1965.

The southern section of the highway near the U.S. border crossing was widened from 2018 to 2020 at a cost of $25.5 million, with funding from the provincial and national governments. The widened highway features two northbound lanes and three southbound lanes for trucks, NEXUS users, and other vehicles.

== Major intersections ==
The entire route is in Langley (township), Metro Vancouver Regional District.

| km | mi | Destinations | Notes |
|---|---|---|---|
| 0.00 | 0.00 | SR 539 south – Lynden, Bellingham | Continues into Washington |
| 0.00 | 0.00 | Canada – United States border at Lynden–Aldergrove Border Crossing | |
| 6.54 | 4.06 | Highway 1A (Fraser Highway) – Langley City Centre, Abbotsford | Aldergrove |
| 11.50 | 7.15 | Highway 1 (TCH) – Vancouver, Hope 264th Street | Interchange (Highway 1 Exit 73) |
1.000 mi = 1.609 km; 1.000 km = 0.621 mi: Route transition
