= Nino Anderlini =

Italian cross-country skier (1926–2004)

Nino Anderlini (10 March 1926 – 24 February 2004) was an Italian cross-country skier who competed in the early 1950s. He finished sixth in the 4 x 10 km relay at the 1952 Winter Olympics in Oslo.
