= Lynden–Aldergrove Border Crossing =

Border crossing between Canada and the United States

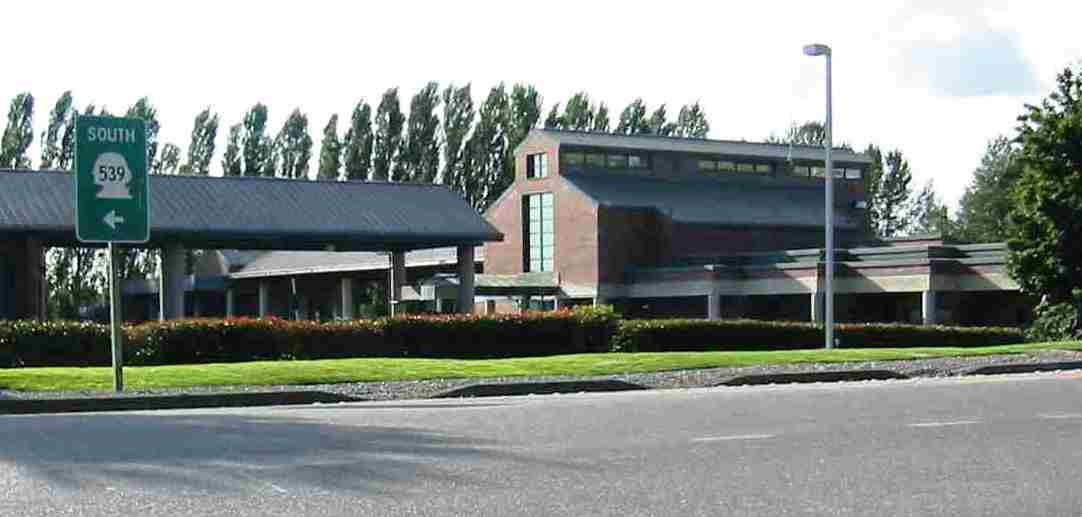
- US Border Inspection Station at Lynden, Washington

Location
- Country: United States; Canada
- Location: SR 539 / Highway 13; US Port: 9949 Guide Meridian Road, Lynden, Washington; Canadian Port: 10 Highway 13, Aldergrove, British Columbia
- Coordinates: 49°00′08″N 122°29′06″W

Details
- Opened: 1889

Website
- US Canadian

The Lynden–Aldergrove Border Crossing connects the town of Lynden, Washington and Aldergrove, British Columbia on the Canada–US border. Washington State Route 539 on the American side joins British Columbia Highway 13 on the Canadian side.

== Canadian side ==
W.H. Vanetta provided the initial customs function from his home about 6 kilometres (4 mi) north of the boundary. Under the administrative oversight of the Port of New Westminster, the opening date of the post could have been as early as 1886, but was definitely by 1889. In 1899, Vanetta was promoted to a sub-collector when the official status of the location was elevated. When A.C. Salt took charge in 1911, the office had moved to the border. The next year, the Port of Abbotsford assumed oversight. In 1911/12, a customhouse, stable and warehouse were erected at the corner of Jackman (272 St) and Boundary (0 Ave) roads. In 1919, the crossing name changed from "Alder Grove" to "Aldergrove". With the closure of the Port of Abbotsford in 1932, oversight returned to New Westminster. In 1948, Huntingdon assumed oversight.

In the 1940s, Canada built a white two-story border inspection facility that had inspection canopies on both the northbound and southbound lanes. In 1972, it was replaced with a small 41-square-metre (437 sq ft) border inspection facility, which was replaced with a 109-square-metre (1,168 sq ft) facility in 2015.

In August 2016, the federal and provincial governments announced a $25.5 million widening of Highway 13 (from two to five lanes) from 8th to 0 avenues to accommodate a new commercial facility, reducing delays at border crossings as well as building a new two lane east–west connection at 3B Avenue from Highway 13 to 264th Street. Work officially started in summer 2018 with the south section completed in December 2019. The remaining highway work was completed in April 2020.

In 2026, construction of a new station was delayed by at least 6 months to at least March 2029. A fence was constructed on the US side in 2020.

The CBSA office is open 8am to midnight.

== US side ==
Early history of the crossing is unclear. Built in the 1920s, the US operated from a small brick border station.

On the evening of May 24, 1979, a 34 year old U.S Customs Officer named Kenneth G. Ward was shot and killed inside the customs office by 25 year old Artie Ray Baker. Baker was attempting to cross into the United States from Canada with his partner, Marie Laure Ferreboeuf. Baker and Ferrebouef fled after the shooting before being captured the following day in Everson, Washington. In 1977, Baker had escaped from Deuel Vocational Institution near Tracy, California after being cheld there for the 1972 murder of an eldery couple in Fresno. He allegedly shot Ward in order to avoid being sent back to jail.

The current 16,421-square-foot (1,526 m^{2}) facility was built by the General Services Administration in 1986, and was named for Inspector Kenneth Ward. Funding issues cancelled a 2003 rebuilding plan.

The crossing operates 8am to midnight.

== See also ==
- List of Canada–United States border crossings
