= Pacific Highway Border Crossing =

Border crossing between Canada and the United States

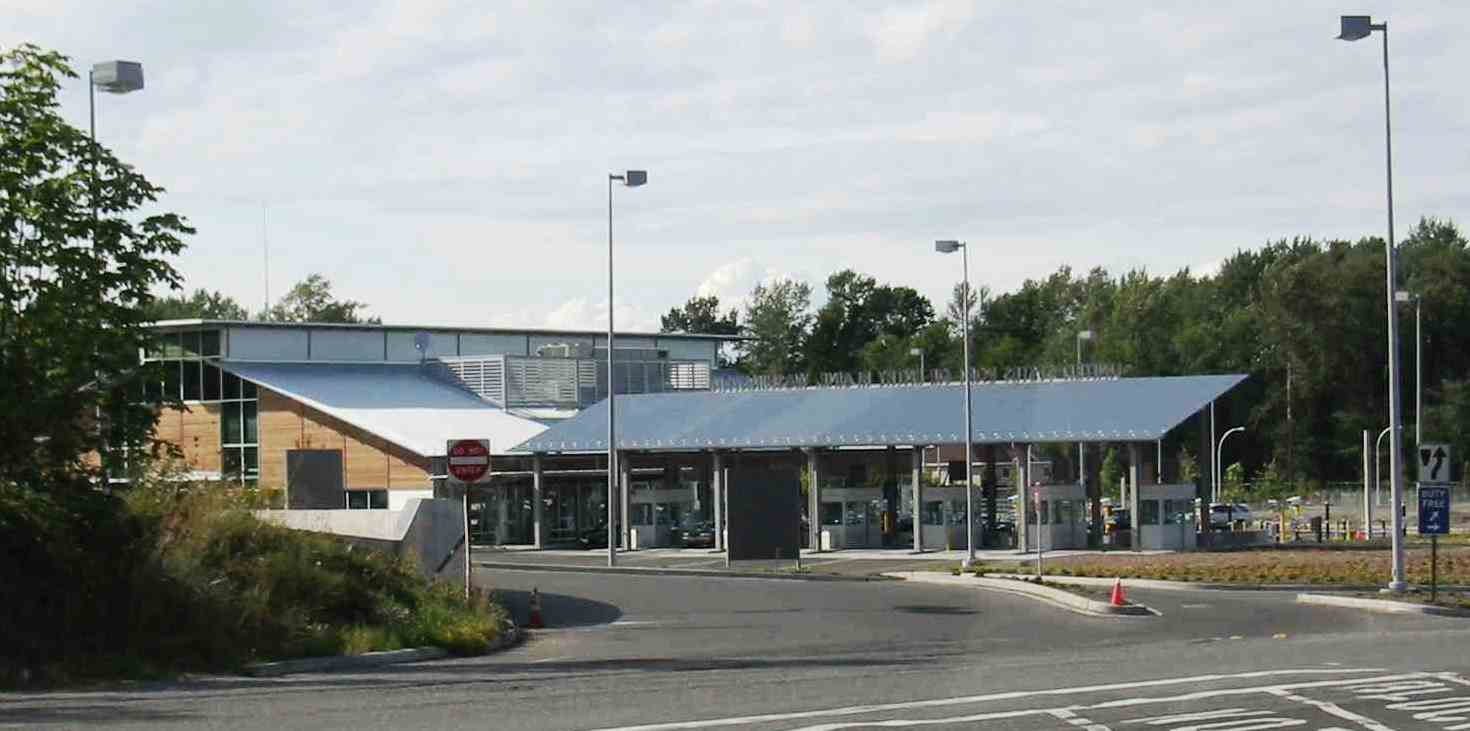
- The US border inspection station at the Pacific Highway Border Crossing

Locaiton
- Country: United States; Canada
- Location: SR 543 / Highway 15 / Pacific Highway; US Port: 9901 Pacific Highway, Blaine, WA 98230; Canadian Port: 28 176th Street, Surrey BC V3Z 9R9
- Coordinates: 49°00′07″N 122°44′06″W

Details
- Opened: 1913

Website
- US Canadian

The Pacific Highway Border Crossing connects the city of Blaine, Washington and the city of Surrey, British Columbia on the Canada–US border. Washington State Route 543 on the American side joins British Columbia Highway 15 on the Canadian side. Since the 1970s, commercial vehicles driving directly between Blaine and Surrey have been required to use this route, one of the five busiest commercial US-Canada border crossings.

== Canadian side ==
On the 1891 opening of the New Westminster and Southern Railway, controlled by the Great Northern Railway (GN), a border inspection station was established about 300 metres (984 ft) west of the present crossing. When the GN relocated its track via White Rock in 1909, the border station moved westward creating the present Peace Arch Border Crossing. In 1913, a road was built along the former GN right-of-way (present Highway 15) to connect with the Yale Road (present Fraser Highway), which created an important road link between Vancouver and the border. That year, A.K. Westland became the inaugural officer at this new port of entry. He operated from a tent at the side of the road, which was replaced months later by a gabled wooden building.

In 1923, an official ceremony commemorated the cement surfacing of the Canadian section of the Pacific Highway. To handle increased traffic through the crossing, the customs office was enlarged, which included a two-bedroom upstairs suite. Vehicle crash damage to the closed gates, which barred entry from midnight to 8am, led to their replacement with sensors. In 1937, the customs and immigration building was replaced by a Tudor-revival style structure. By 1944, this was the third busiest crossing in Canada. In 1953, a freight warehouse, truck bays and bus terminal were added. The 1937 building continued to handle auto traffic prior to replacement in 1986.

The Port of New Westminster provided administrative oversight until the status was upgraded to an independent port in 1938.

Vehicle inspections at the crossing have discovered various amounts of cocaine being trafficked illegally over the border, including 121 kg (267 lb) in 2008, 76 kg (168 lb) in 2009, 62 kg (137 lb) in 2013, 107.5 kg (237 lb) in 2016, and 71.5 kg (158 lb) (CA$3.5 million) in 2021.

In 2022, protesting truck drivers seeking to end public health measures related to the COVID-19 pandemic blockaded the crossing for a few days.

== US side ==
The initial border office occupied a residence. In 1915, the 24-hour office at the present Peace Arch site was closed and service at the Pacific Highway crossing extended to around 18 hours daily. The US operated out of large industrial building until a brick Georgian-revival border station was built in 1931. The crossing remained closed on Sundays due to staffing issues.

The current facility was built in 1987. Following the September 11 attacks, CBP increased vehicle inspections, which caused long delays of up to six hours for freight trucks.

In 2012, the NEXUS hours were extended to operate from 6 a.m. to 9 p.m.

== Gallery ==
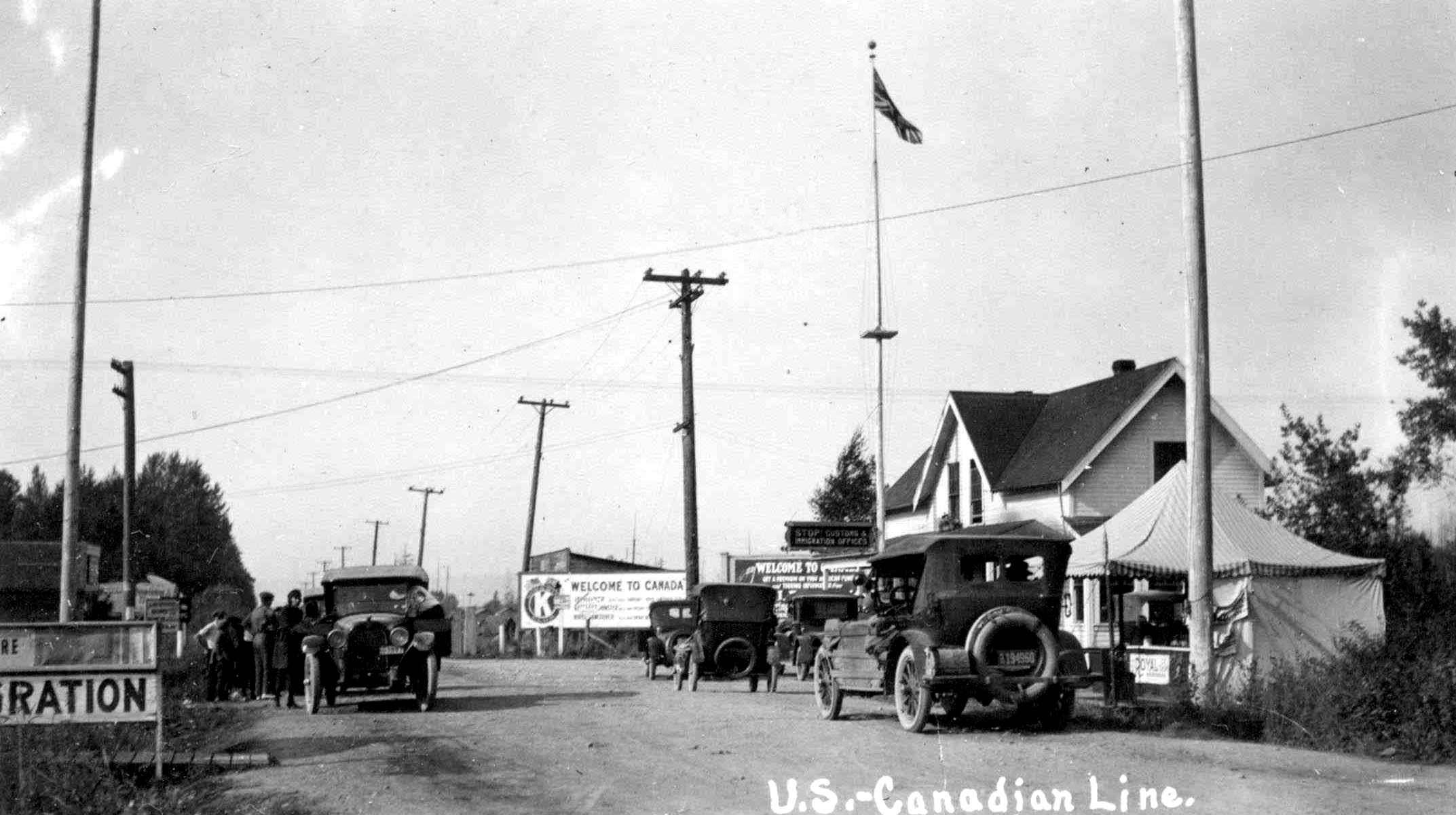
Pacific Highway
Canadian station, 1921

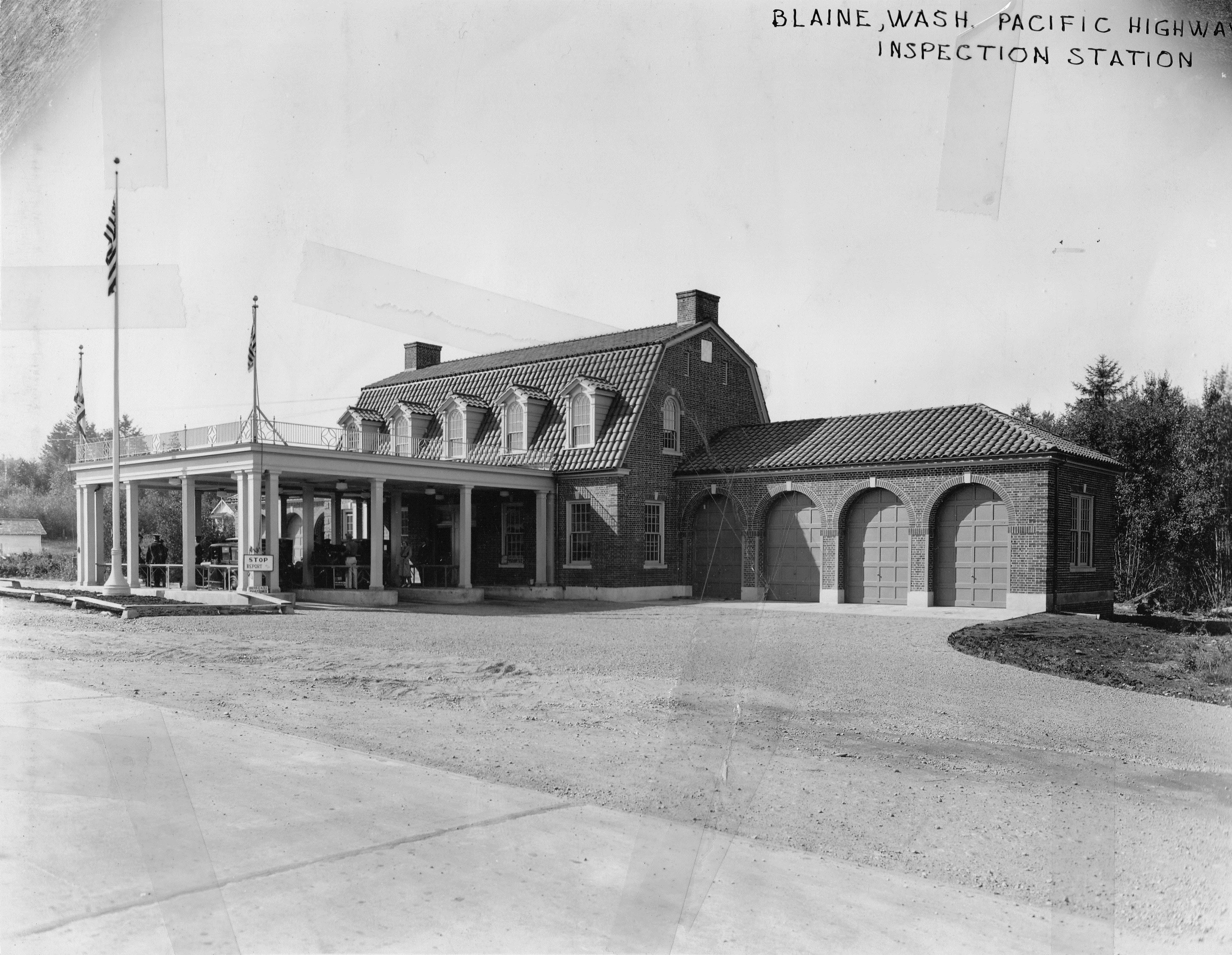
Pacific Highway
US border station, 1931

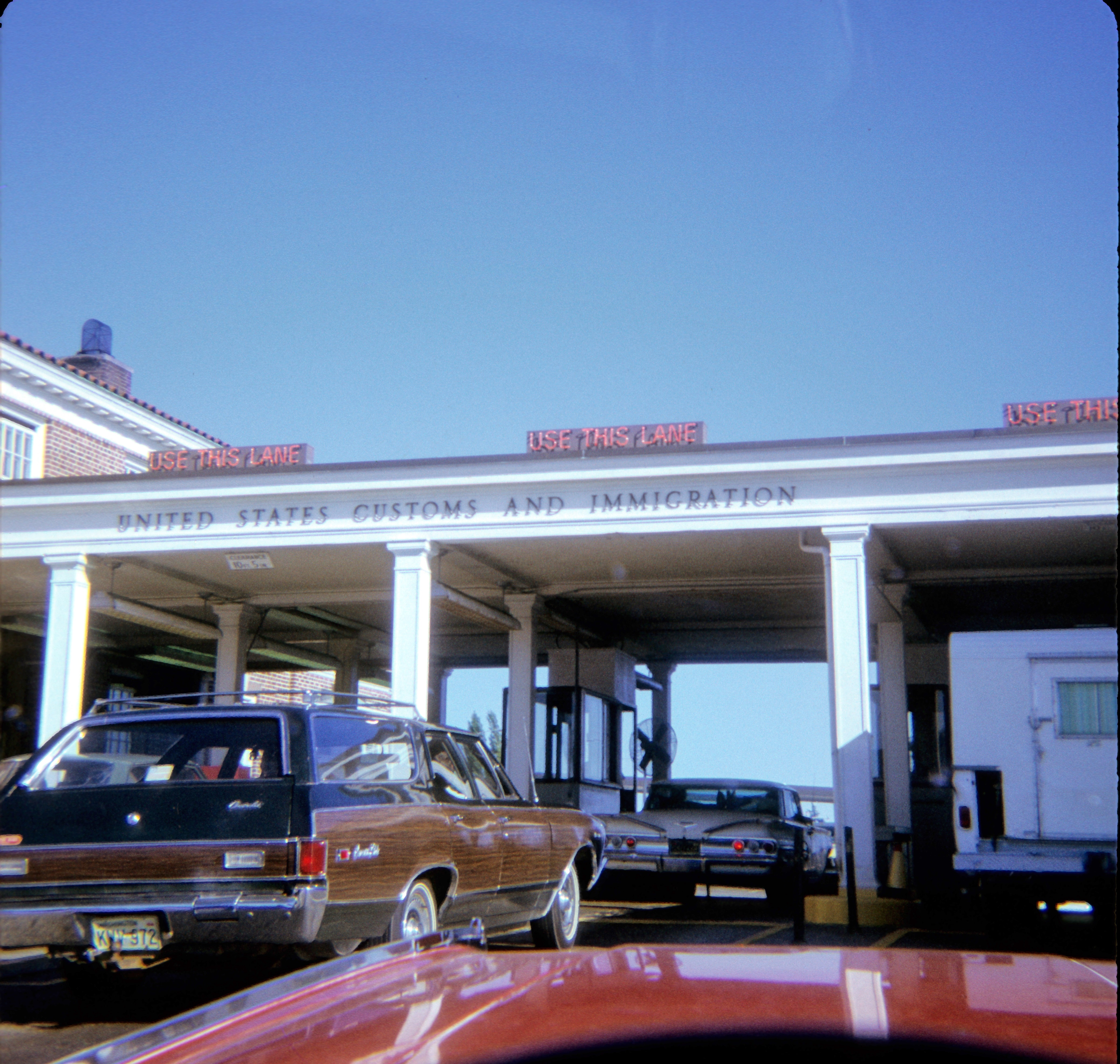
Pacific Highway
US border station, 1973

== See also ==
- List of Canada–United States border crossings
