= Scrapbooking =

Method for preserving personal and family history in the form of a scrapbook

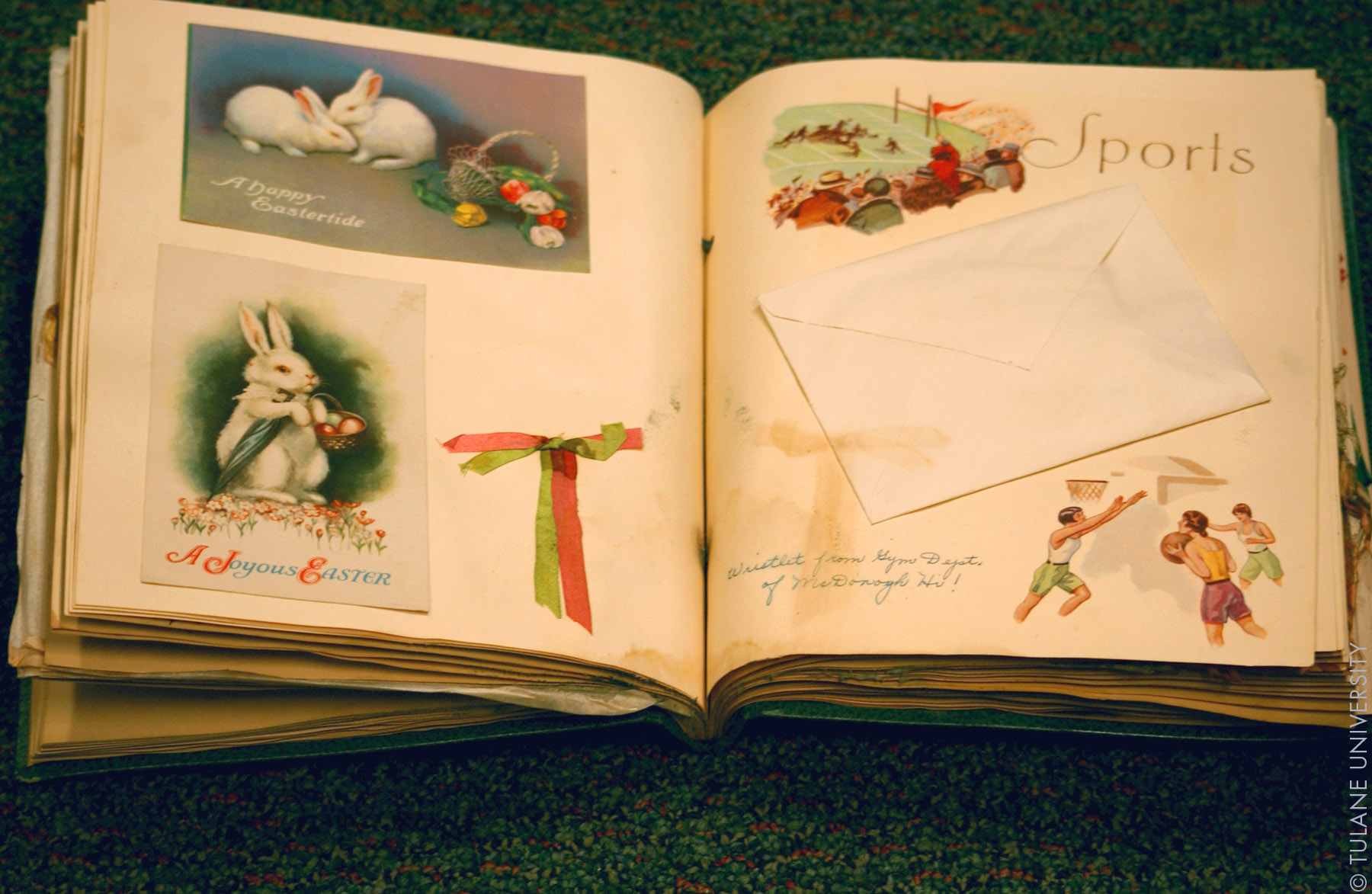
A vintage scrapbook

Scrapbooking is a method of preserving, presenting, and arranging personal and family history in the form of a book, box, or card. Typical memorabilia include photographs, printed media, and artwork. Scrapbook albums are often decorated and frequently contain extensive journal entries or written descriptions. Scrapbooking can also be incorporated into therapy and can help individuals cope with trauma or grief.

== History ==
In the 15th century, commonplace books, popular in England, emerged as a way to compile information such as recipes, quotations, letters, and poems. Each commonplace book was unique to its creator's particular interests.

In the 16th century, friendship albums became popular. These albums were used much like modern day yearbooks; at the request of the album's owner, friends or patrons would enter their names, titles and short texts or illustrations into the album. The albums were often created as souvenirs of European tours and would contain local memorabilia, including coats of arms or works of art commissioned by local artisans. Starting in 1570, it became fashionable to incorporate colored plates depicting popular scenes such as Venetian costumes or Carnival scenes. These plates provided affordable options as compared to original works. As such, they were sold specifically for the purpose of embellishing albums rather than to commemorate or document a specific event. In 1775, James Granger published a history of England with several blank pages at the end of the book. The pages were designed to allow the book's owner to personalize the book with their own memorabilia. The practice of pasting engravings, lithographs, and other illustrations into books—or even taking the books apart, inserting new matter, and rebinding them—became known as extra-illustrating or grangerizing.

Additionally, friendship albums, confession albums, and school yearbooks afforded girls in the 18th and 19th centuries an outlet through which to share their literary skills, and allowed girls an opportunity to document their own personalized historical record. In "Negotiating Intimacy in British Romantic Friendship Albums", Renee Bryzik has analyzed five albums from the Pfozheimer archive at the New York Public Library that illustrate the practice's range in style and content.

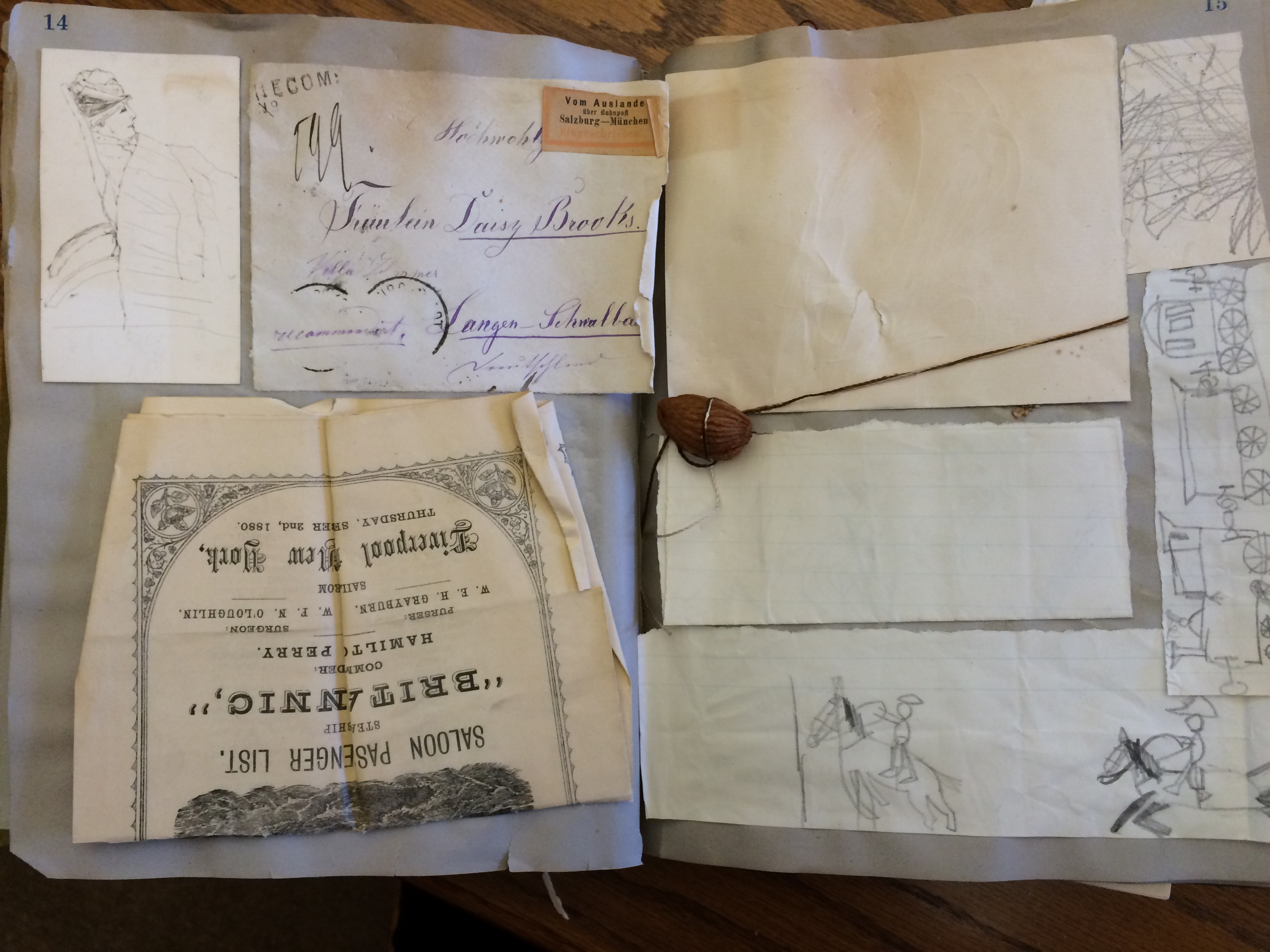
A page from a Smith College student's scrapbook circa 1906. This page uses drawings, ephemera, and physical objects to represent a day in the life of the student.

For example, college women around the end of the 18th century extensively used scrapbooks to construct representations of their everyday life as students. Without photograph albums to provide images of these life events, students created unique representations through scrapbooks in order to illustrate their lives using ephemera and memorabilia. A guest list or group of visiting cards might represent a young woman's visit to a party. A playbill and ticket stub might serve as reminders of a trip to New York to see a Broadway show. Solid objects such as plants, silverware, or small trinkets were also used when further visual representation was needed. A page from these subject-based scrapbooks might include class schedules, exam booklets, letters from professors, or other printed material from school events. Thus scrapbooks from this era can create a more complete image of their maker's life.

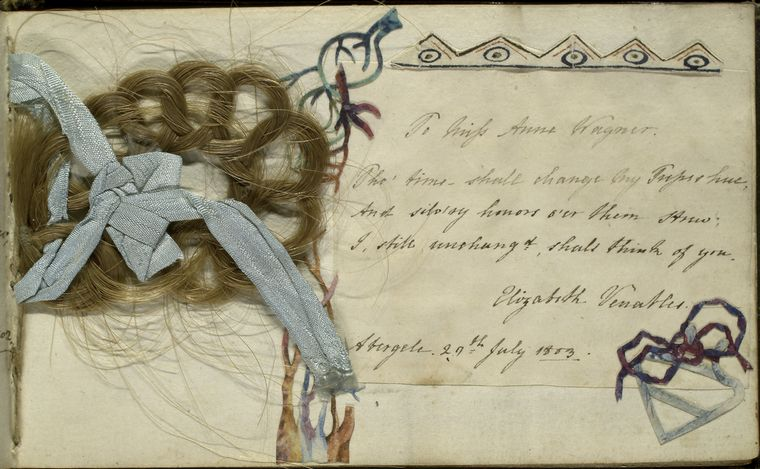
An elaborate example of a braided hairlock attached to a page, from the scrapbook of Anne Wagner, kept between 1795 and 1834

During the 19th century, scrapbooking was seen as a more involved way to preserve one's experiences than journaling or other writing-based forms of logging. Printed material such as cheap newspapers, visiting cards, playbills, and pamphlets circulated widely during the 19th century and often became the primary components of people's scrapbooks. The growing volume of ephemera of this kind, parallel to the growth of industrialized society, created a demand for methods of cataloguing and preserving them. This is why scrapbooks devoted solely to cataloguing recipes, coupons, or other lists were also common during this time. Until later in the 19th century, scrapbooks were seen as functional as well as aesthetically pleasing. Several factors, including marketing strategies and technological advancement, contributed to the image of scrapbooking moving further toward the aesthetic plane over the years.

The advent of modern photography began with the first permanent photograph created by Joseph Nicéphore Niépce in 1826. This allowed the average person to begin to incorporate photographs into their scrapbooks. However, books or albums made specifically for showcasing photographs alone were not popularized in the United States until closer to 1860. Before that point, photographs were not thought of as items to be reproduced and shared. Demand for photo albums was spurred on in large part by the growing popularity of the carte de visite, a small photograph distributed in the same manner one might a visiting card.

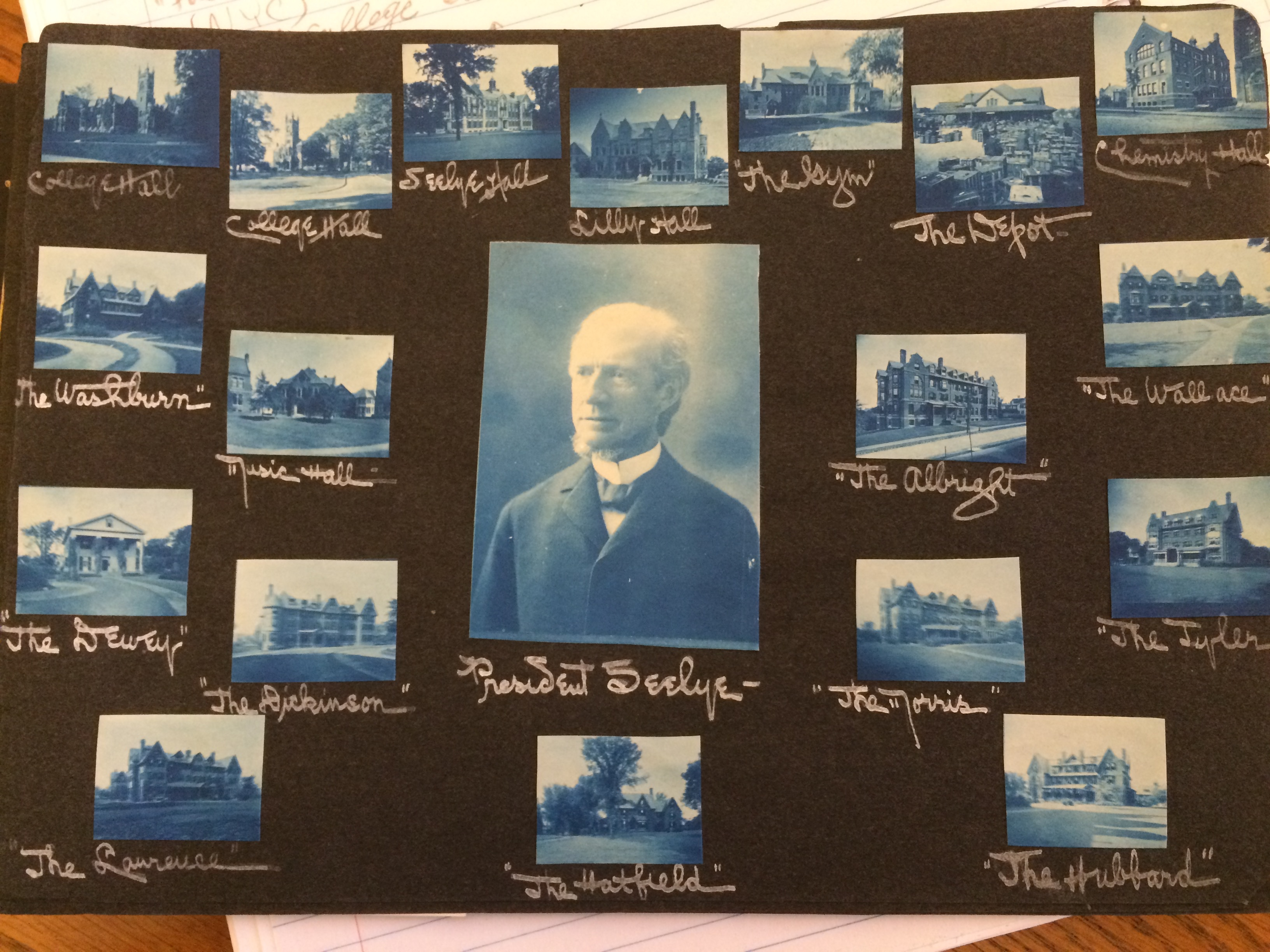
A page from a photograph album circa 1906. The pages and color of this album are made especially for displaying photographs. The album's owner has arranged her photographs in order to represent her college campus and president.

Old scrapbooks tended to have photos mounted with photo-mounting corners and perhaps notations of who was in a photo or where and when it was taken. They often included bits of memorabilia like newspaper clippings, letters, etc. An early-known American scrapbooker and inventor of scrapbooking supplies was Mark Twain. In 1873, Twain designed and patented a popular self-pasting scrapbook. Twain carried his own scrapbooks on his travels as he collected souvenirs, clippings, and pictures. Other notable writers who scrapbooked were author Louisa May Alcott and poet Anne Sexton. Various individuals and communities created scrapbooks throughout the twentieth century in Britain. Among the most ardent scrapbookers of the 18th century was William Henry Dorsey, an artist who collected documents, paintings and artifact pertaining to Black history. Dorsey compiled hundreds of scrapbooks on the lives of Black people during the 18th century and built a collection that he laid out in his home in Philadelphia. Scrapbooking was a way to preserve Black history and document incidents of racial injustice, such as lynchings. In 1854, Frederick Douglass directly addressed Black men who read his publication The North Star (anti-slavery newspaper) and encouraged them to add the newspaper's content to their scrapbooks.

== Modern scrapbooking ==
In modern scrapbooking, the concept of preservation has become more apparent as scrapbookers now make these creations no longer prioritizing their audience, but themselves. Shaping their personal narratives by selecting the memories they consider meaningful, scrapbooking has developed a new meaning to both the scrapbooker and to the next generation. Through this intentional choice-making, scrapbookers create memorials that give significance to everyday experiences that might otherwise be forgotten. Rather than only scrapbooking the eye-catching or aesthetically pleasing photos, memory keepers get to choose which experiences are "scrapworthy" to them and how they want to be remembered in their family history which moves away from the traditional scrapbooking norms. In other words, scrapbooks are inherently selective; they are never a complete portrayal of what life was for a person, but instead a story that the scrapbookers chooses to tell, making scrapbooking no different from storytelling. Through this process, children and future generations come to understand that what is preserved in a scrapbook reflects what the scrapbooker values as significant or worth remembering.

Modern scrapbooks are shaped through the scrapbooker's perspective. Being able to choose which events they want their life to be defined as and which ones to leave out, the intentional incompleteness that modern scrapbooking emphasizes aligns scrapbooks with other autobiographical forms.

This video is an example of how to create a page for the new and modern day scrapbooker.

Marielen Wadley Christensen (pronounced as the names "Mary Ellen"), of Elk Ridge, Utah, United States (formerly of Spanish Fork, Utah) is credited with turning scrapbooking from what was once just the ages-old hobby into the actual industry containing businesses devoted specifically to the manufacturing and sale of scrapbooking supplies. She began designing creative pages for her family's photo memories, inserting the completed pages into sheet protectors collected in 3-ring binders. By 1980, she had assembled over fifty volumes and was invited to display them at the World Conference on Records in Salt Lake City. In 1981 Marielen and her husband Anthony Jay ("A.J.") authored and published a how-to booklet, Keeping Memories Alive, and opened a scrapbook store in Spanish Fork that ended up with the same name, that remains open today.

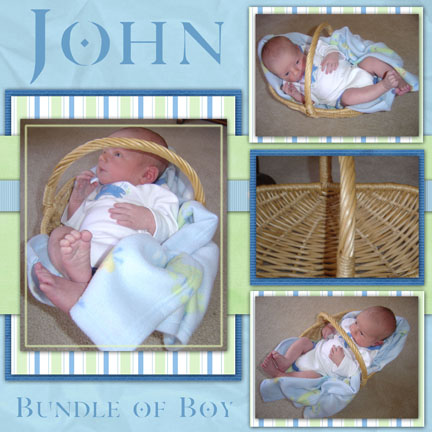
A digital scrapbook layout showing a varied use of photographs

Following the lead of Keeping Memories Alive (which was originally in the smaller building next door and named The Annex in its early years), many other stores have popped up and cater to the scrapbooking community. Besides Keeping Memories Alive, these include companies such as Creative Memories, Making Memories, Stampin' Up!, and Close to My Heart.

According to Google Trends, the search terms related to scrapbook and scrapbooking have seen a 70 percent decline since its peak in 2005–2006. However, there is much debate among the community of people who engage in memory keeping about what the decline means for the health and future of the industry as a whole. However, if one takes a closer look, it is easy to see all the ways people continue memory keeping even if it does not fall strictly within the definition of traditional scrapbooking as defined here.

=== Alternatives to scrapbooking ===
Some examples include the advent of Smash books created by EK Success, which in some ways, are a closer representation to original scrapbooks in that they are wire-bound books in a variety of sizes consisting of blank printed background papers into which one can journal and glue mementos.

Another variation is the introduction and growth of pocket scrapbooking, most well-known and represented by Project Life created and introduced by Becky Higgins. Higgins created the system in response to her personal desire to continue record the lives of her children and family, but in a quicker, more simple way that allowed her the flexibility to complete the project, but still in an attractive, cohesive way.

One of the newest trends into scrapbooking is bringing the layout designs down to a much smaller size. A traditional traveler's notebook is a simple leather cover with a band to keep closed. The cover can hold up to six inserts which can be used in many ways. The notebook has grown in popularity, allowing for journaling and memory keeping for any interests.

Mini albums are another way of memory keeping and a new trend in scrapbooking. They can be made in different sizes based on the number of photos to be put inside the album. These mini albums can be constructed and hand-made from scratch.

== Media ==
=== Materials ===
The most important scrapbooking supply is the album itself, which can be permanently bound, or allow for the insertion of pages. There are other formats such as mini albums and accordion-style fold-out albums. Some of these are adhered to various containers, such as matchbooks, CD cases, or other small holders. When scrap artists started moving away from the "page" and onto alternative surfaces and objectives, they termed these creations "altered items" or now simply called "off-the-page". This movement circles back to the history of art from the 1960s when Louise Nevelson was doing "Assemblages" with found objects and recycled parts.

Modern scrapbooking is done largely on 12-inch-square (30 cm) or letter-size (US Letter [8.5 by 11 inches] or A4 [210 by 297 mm]) pages. More recently, smaller albums have become popular. The most common new formats are 6, 7, or 8 inches (15, 17.5, or 20 cm) square. It is important to many scrappers to protect their pages with clear page protectors.

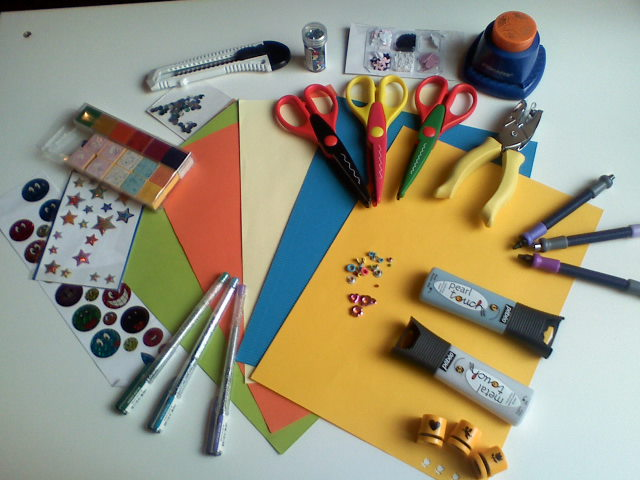
Different scrapbooking materials and tools

Basic materials include background papers (including printed and cardstock paper), photo corner mounts (or other means of mounting photos such as adhesive dots, photo mounting tape, or acid-free glue), scissors, a paper trimmer or cutting tool, art pens, archival pens for journaling, and mounting glues (like thermo-tac). More elaborate designs require more specialized tools such as die cut templates, rubber stamps, craft punches, stencils, inking tools, eyelet setters, heat embossing tools, and personal die cut machines. Many people who enjoy scrapbooking will create their own background papers by using the tools mentioned along with "fancy" textured scissors.

Various accessories, referred to as "embellishments", are used to decorate scrapbook pages. Embellishments include stickers, rub-ons, stamps, eyelets, brads, chipboard elements in various shapes, alphabet letters, lace, wire, fabric, beads, sequins, and ribbon. The use of die cut machines is also increasingly popular; in recent years a number of electronic die-cutting machines resembling a plotter with a drag knife have hit the market (e.g. The Cricut), enabling scrappers to use their computer to create die cuts out of any shape or font with the use of free or third-party software. Scrapbook makers will also use magazine clippings to "decorate" a scrapbook.

One of the key components of modern scrapbooking is the archival quality of the supplies. Designed to preserve photographs and journaling in their original state, materials encouraged by most serious scrapbookers are of a higher quality than those of many typical photo albums commercially available. Scrappers insist on acid-free, lignin-free papers, stamp ink, and embossing powder. In using pigment-based inks, which are fade resistant, colorfast, and often waterproof, scrappers can preserve their works. Many scrappers use buffered paper, which will protect photos from acid in memorabilia used in the scrapbook. Older "magnetic" albums are not acid-free and thus cause damage to the photos and memorabilia included in them. Gloves, too, are used to protect photos from the oil on hands.

An international standard, ISO 18902, provides specific guidelines on materials that are safe for scrapbooking through its requirements for albums, framing, and storage materials. ISO 18902 includes requirements for photo-safety and a specific pH range for acid-free materials. ISO 18902 prohibits the use of harmful materials, including Polyvinyl chloride (PVC) and Cellulose nitrate.

=== Digital scrapbooking ===
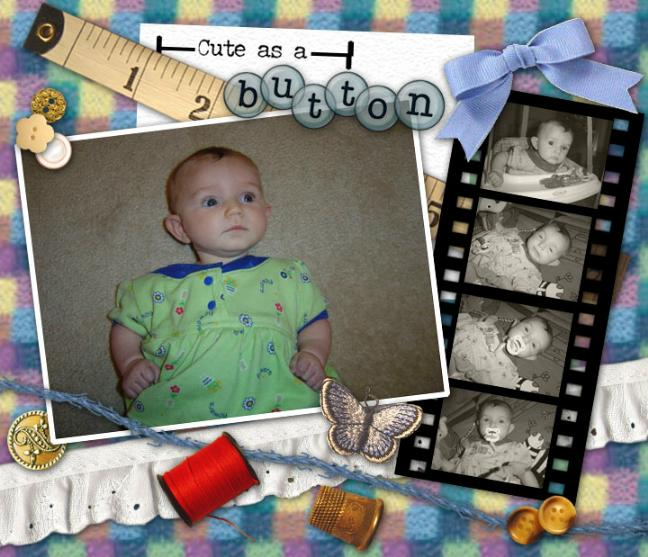
A digital scrapbook layout that demonstrates the use of numerous digital "materials"

The new era of digital scrapbooking has allowed many previous inconveniences of scrapbooking to be absolved and for supplies to become readily accessible. Online programs provide all of the features, that could previously only be purchased separately, all in the same place. This includes tools such as colorful paper, stickers, patterns, and fonts. All features allow for simple cropping and resizing to fulfill the scrapbooker's vision. Furthermore, the addition of designs and templates permit a convenient organization of pictures and quick upload of photos. All the photos and tools are available in one place, making the process easily transportable and well-situated for any location.

The advent of scanners, desktop publishing, page layout programs, and advanced printing options make it relatively easy to create professional-looking layouts in digital form. The internet allows scrapbookers to self-publish their work. Scrapbooks that exist completely in digital image form are referred to as "digital scrapbooks" or "computer scrapbooks".

While some people prefer the physicality of the actual artifacts they paste onto the pages of books, the digital scrapbooking hobby has grown in popularity in recent years. Some of the advantages include a greater diversity of materials, less environmental impact, cost savings, the ability to share finished pages more readily on the internet, and the use of image editing software to experiment with manipulating page elements in multiple ways without making permanent adjustments. A traditional scrapbook layout may employ a background paper with a torn edge. While a physical page can only be torn once and never restored, a digital paper can be torn and untorn with ease, allowing the scrapbooker to try out different looks without wasting supplies. Some web-based digital scrapbooks include a variety of wallpapers and backgrounds to help the users create a rich visual experience. Each paper, photo, or embellishment exists on its own layer in the document, and one can reposition them at one's discretion.

Furthermore, digital scrapbooking is not limited to digital storage and display. Many digital scrappers print their finished layouts to be stored in scrapbook albums. Others have books professionally printed in hard bound books to be saved as keepsakes. Professional printing- and binding-services offer free software to create scrapbooks with professional layouts and individual layout capabilities. Because of the integrated design and order workflow, real hardcover bound books can be produced more cost effectively.

Early digital scrapbooks were created from digital photos uploaded to an external site. Over time, this moved to a model of downloading software onto a personal computer that will organize photos and help create the digital scrapbook. With the growth of Web 2.0 functionality, digital scrapbooking is going back online, to avoid the hassles of having to download and install PC software. The availability of cheap online storage (e.g., on Amazon's S3 service), and the desire to leverage pre-uploaded online albums (e.g., on Yahoo's Flickr) make it more convenient for users to directly compose their digital scrapbooks online. Print on demand fulfillment enables such digital scrapbooks to effectively supplant traditional scrapbooks.

Digital scrapbooking has advanced to the point where digital scrapbook layouts may be made entirely online using Web-based software. Users upload their photos, create a digital scrapbook layout using a Web page and digital scrapbook graphics. The layout can then be downloaded as a low-resolution JPEG file for sharing on the Web or as a high-resolution JPEG file for printing.

== Crops ==
Scrapbooking crops (or "Crops") are events where two or more scrapbookers gather to work in a social circle on their books, cards or other projects. It is similar to the old quilting bees that used to be socially prevalent, but has been replaced by today's "Crop". Attendees bring specific supplies themselves to work on said projects and sometimes there are vendors at these events to purchase any extra scrapbooking needs. At these events ideas are shared, techniques are taught to one another, products used (e.g. cutting machines such as, Silhouette & Cricut) are learned about and attendees have a few hours to days of uninterrupted time to work on their scrapbooks, cards, or any project they are needing to accomplish. Events are planned informally at one's home, a church hall or establishments with meeting rooms to the larger attended crops that encompass days of time in a hotel, where the attendee stays in the same hotel and works in the large ballroom or conference rooms in the hotel with tens to hundreds of attendees. Some of the ways to learn about events are mainly through word of mouth, social media, and community postings.

== Industry statistics ==
Some people attribute the increased interest in scrapbooking to a renewed passion for genealogy, while others say that it is an outlet for those interested in photography and graphic design.

For evidence of interest in scrapbooking, consider the following facts:

- Over 4 million women in the United States alone consider themselves to be scrapbookers.
- Over 4% of all women in U.S. have done traditional scrapbooking. Millions of others do various aspects of photo books but are not scrapbookers.
- Scrapbooking is one of the largest categories within the craft and hobby industry and now considered to be the third most popular craft in the nation. From 1996 through 2004, sales of scrapbooking products increased across the United States. In 2005, annual sales flattened for the first time after many back to back years of double growth. From 2006 through 2010 traditional scrapbooking sales have declined, while digital forms of scrapbooking have grown. Traditional scrapbooking sales for 2010 have declined to about $1.6 billion in annual sales from a peak of about $2.5 billion in 2005.

During that same time frame the number of independent scrapbooking stores declined from a high of 4,200 to about 1,200 independent storefronts. The number of scrapbooking manufacturers also declined in that same period from a high of 800 to under 250.

== Common idioms ==
=== Journaling ===
In addition to the collection of photographs, tickets, postcards, and other memorabilia, journaling is often a principal element in modern scrapbooks. Journaling is text that describes, explains, or accents the photographs on a scrapbook page. Contemporary journaling can take many forms. It can be reflective and story-like, take a reportive tone, or simply be a list of words. Journaling may also include song lyrics, quotations, and poems. The value of journaling lies in the fact that it provides an account of family histories that may otherwise not be preserved.

Many consider journaling one of the most important elements of any scrapbook. Journaling is a personal choice and it can describe the event, the photographs, or relate feelings and emotions. Handwritten journaling is considered best by some scrapbookers who see handwriting as valuable for posterity, but many people journal on the computer and print it onto a variety of surfaces including vellum, tape, ribbon, and paper.

=== Sketches ===
Scrapbookers will sometimes refer to sketches for inspiration for their pages. Sketches are a hand-drawn layout showing where to position photos, titles, journaling, and embellishments. It gives novice scrapbookers somewhere to begin if they are not experienced with balancing the layout correctly. Scrapbookers can interpret the sketch in any way they choose; it is a great starting point when one has scrapper's block. There have been many sketchbooks published and scrapbooking magazines always offer sketches as part of their content.

== Scrapbook therapy ==
Scrapbooking can serve as a therapeutic activity. During scrapbook therapy, individuals recognize specific people, events, and or emotions in a scrapbook or photo album. Research shows that scrapbooking therapy can reduce stress, depressive symptoms, and even improve physical symptoms. Scrapbooking therapy can be done in groups or individually with a therapist. Both settings connect people to life events and their emotions through mementos, photos, and drawings. When scrapbooking is structured in a group, participants have benefited from the scrapbook promoting discussion and social connectedness, which can be beneficial for those who have trouble voicing their feelings.

=== Grief and trauma ===
Scrapbooking can help individuals process grief because creating a memory book helps scrapbookers accept the reality of someone's loss. Scrapbooking can also serve as a lasting tribute and a way to preserve a loved one and their stories. Scrapbooking has been reported to reduce symptoms of PTSD and other trauma induced problems.

=== Dementia and memory loss ===
Scrapbooking can have several benefits for individuals with dementia or memory loss by using photos and other prompts to cue memory recall. Scrapbooking can be a way to preserve the memories, stories, and recipes of those with memory loss.

== See also ==
- Baby book, a record of a baby's birth and growth
- Commonplace book, formerly a way to compile knowledge, usually by writing information into books
- Cricut, a home-scrapbooking machine.
- Junk journal
- Media preservation
- Preservation (library and archival science)
- Silva rerum, a specific type of a book, a multi-generational chronicle, kept by many Polish noble families from the 16th through 18th centuries
