= Self-adhesive plastic =

Self-adhesive plastic could mean:

- Self-adhesive plastic sheet, a wide sheet material used for decorative purposes
- Pressure-sensitive tape, a narrow tape used typically for functional purposes
