= Baby book =

Memory album tracking an infant's growth and development

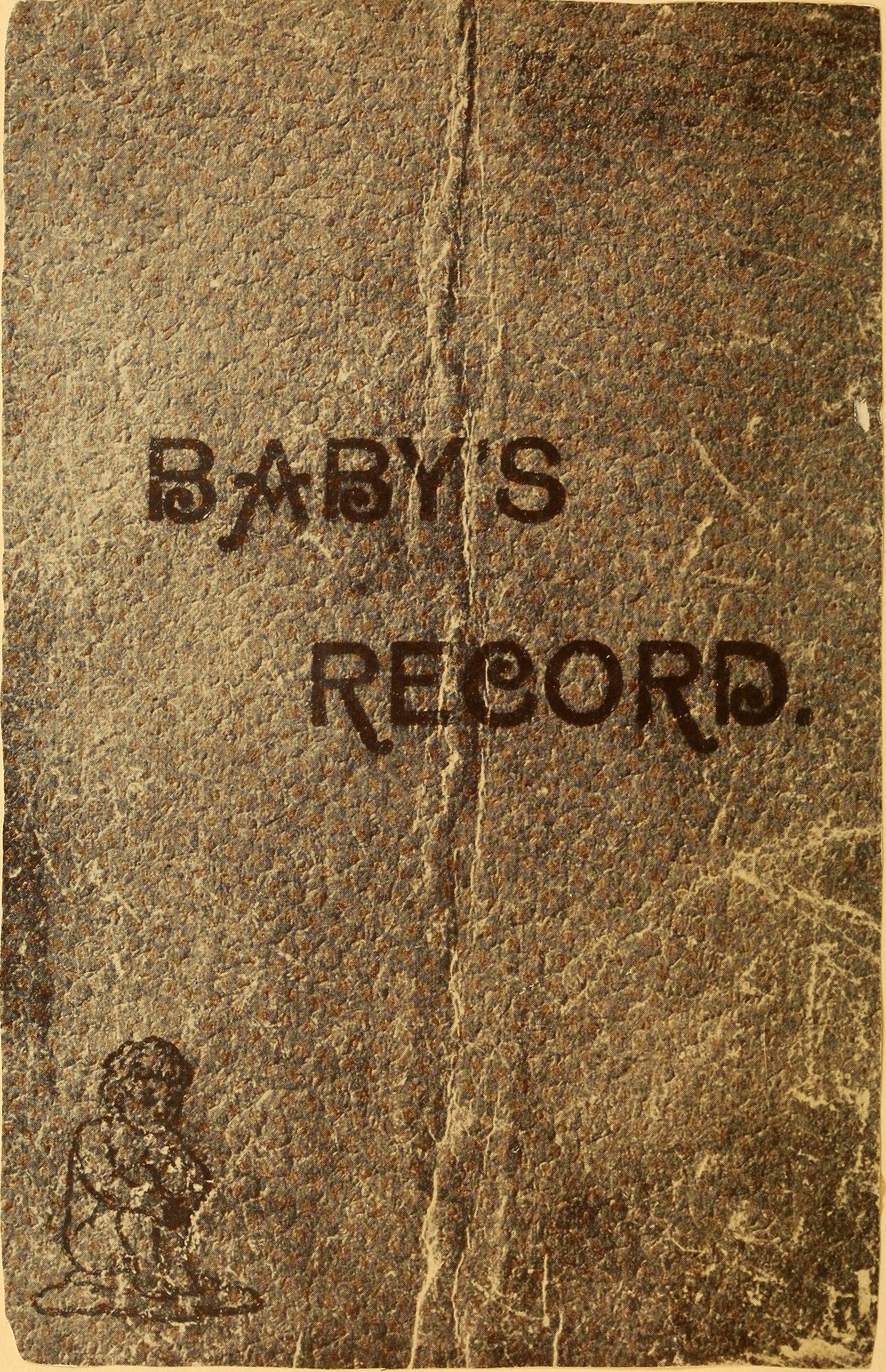
Stevenson's Baby Book; Being the Record of the Sayings and Doings of Robert Louis Balfour Stevenson, son of Thomas Stevenson, C.E. and Margaret Isabella Balfour or Stevenson

Baby books are scrapbooks used by parents to track their children's development.

== History ==
Baby books first became popular over 100 years ago to keep track of children's diseases, immunization records, and growth. Baby books started appearing more frequently in homes in the 1910s but gained popularity in the succeeding decades.

== Uses ==
Baby books can track a child's development or mark developmental milestones. Many have ledgers that can track disease and immunizations. Some books are pre-fabricated with fill-in-the-blank areas and places to put special mementoes, such as a lock of hair from the baby's first haircut, a hospital bracelet, birth announcements, or cards from the baby shower. Parents may include ultrasound pictures, pictures of the baby at birth, and pictures as the child grows up. Parents can look at baby books for memories.

Baby books have also been used for research. UCLA has a collection of baby books dating back to 1882 used for the study of the history of childhood, family, art, medicine, architecture, and other disciplines.

Various memories can be included in the baby books, like birth story, baby shower, naming of the baby, first cry, walking or sitting, first movement, saying first word, as well as various occasions like first Christmas, Easter, Thanksgiving, Pictures for each month Christening/Baptism/Dedication.
