= OLFA =

Japanese utility knife company

OLFA Corporation
- Native name: オルファ株式会社
- Type: Private KK
- Industry: Tools
- Founded: 1956; 70 years ago
- Founder: Yoshio Okada
- Headquarters: Higashi-nakamoto, Higashinari-ku, Osaka, 537-0021, Japan
- Area served: Worldwide
- Key people: Shinichi Okada (President)
- Products: Cutters; Knives; Blades; Cutting accessories
- Revenue: ¥8.62 billion (2024)
- Number of employees: 99 (2024)
- Website: olfa.com

OLFA Corporation (オルファ株式会社, Orufa Kabushiki-gaisha) is a Japanese manufacturer of utility knives, founded in 1956 in Osaka, Japan. The name is derived from the Japanese words oru (折る, bend and break) and ha (刃, blade). The company is known for inventing the snap-off blade and the rotary cutter.

== Snap-off blade ==
Founder Yoshio Okada and his younger brother Saburo worked for printing companies where they cut paper with razor blades, but the blades quickly became unusable as their edges wore out. The brothers invented blades with scored lines which could be snapped to reveal sharp unused sections of blade. This idea came to them when they recalled how a chocolate bar given to them by an American soldier in childhood had also broken off in sections.

These snap-off blades and their associated handles are now made by many manufacturers in three standard sizes (9, 18, and 25mm).

OLFA cutter

== Other products ==
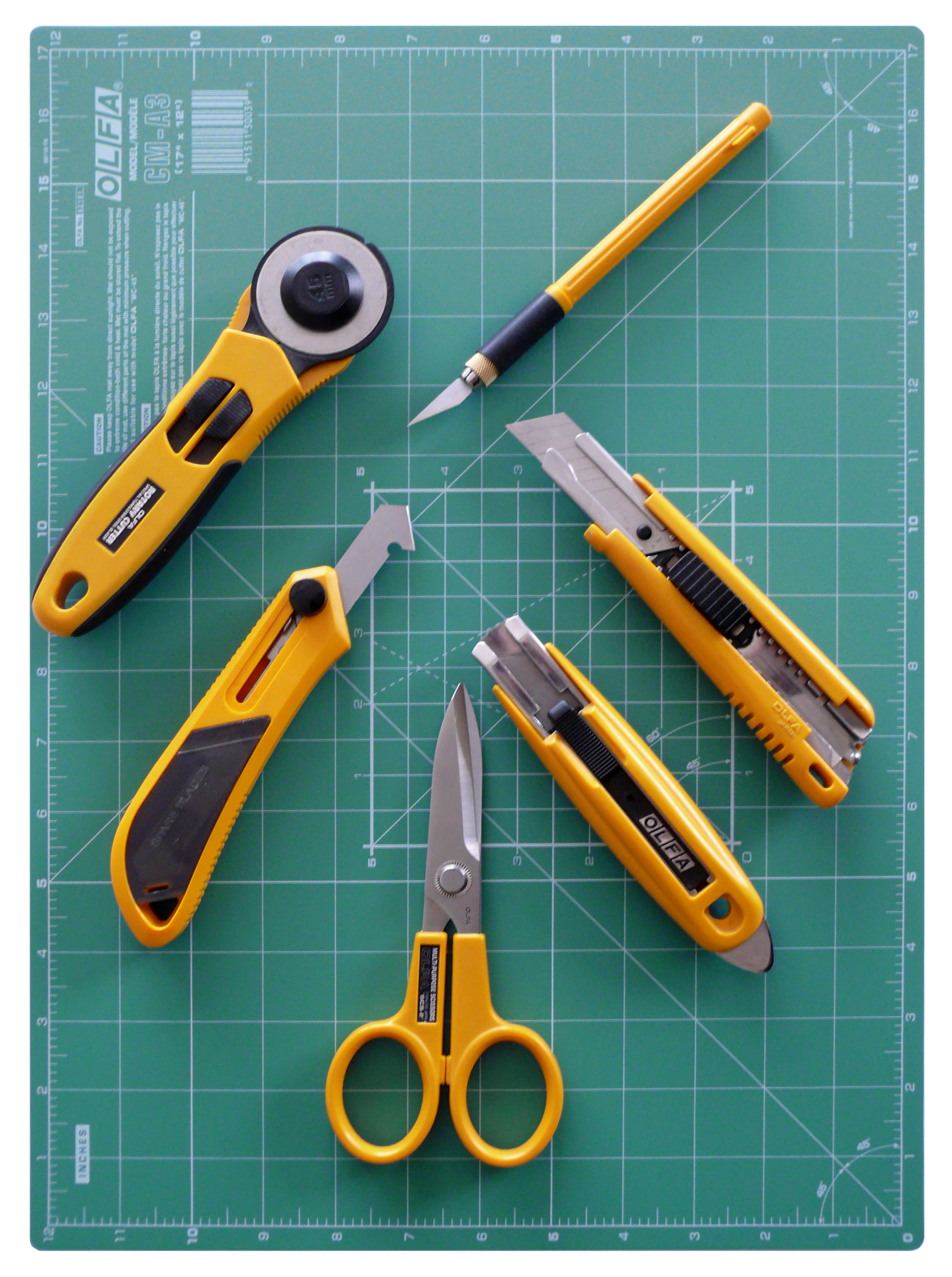
OLFA tools and cutting mat

Their products include heavy-duty and specialty cutting tools for the building industry, safety tools for industrial applications, rotary cutters, self-healing or cutting mats, art knives and rulers for the crafting industry.

The company's products are frequently recommended for use in crafts such as book repair, calligraphy, quilt making, modelling, sewing, picture framing and appliqué.

== See also ==
- X-Acto
