= Heat transfer vinyl =

Material used with a heat press to adhere designs

Heat transfer vinyl (HTV) is a type of plastic film that can be used on certain fabrics and materials to apply designs to promotional products, textiles and apparel, such as T-shirts. HTV products can be made up of polyurethane or poly(vinyl chloride). It can be cut, weeded, and placed on a substrate for application via a heat press. The design is cut into the material with a cutting plotter in reverse (adhesive/vinyl side up). The excess material is removed with tools such as hooks or tweezers - a manual and dextrous process referred to as "weeding". The tacky adhesive between the carrier and the vinyl holds together complex designs, although the labour naturally increases the more weeding that is required. The clear polyester carrier keeps the design visible to aid positioning on the substrate. For these and other reasons, it is a popular and more robust alternative to transfer paper (that does not incorporate a carrier sheet). Heat transfer vinyl is made in single colors and also has special options such as patterned, glitter, flocked, holographic, glow-in-the-dark, reflective and 3D puff. Heat transfer vinyl also benefits from a high degree of stretch and rebound, achieved by a memory effect, making it suitable for use on apparel and other flexible items including the garments typically used, such as sports jerseys.

== Types of heat transfer vinyl ==
Heat transfer vinyl comes in single colors, in the specialty options listed above, in full-color pattern options, and in a printable version that must be used with solvent ink & a solvent printer. It is best used for simple designs with minimal colors since each individual color or pattern used in the design must be cut, weeded, and heat pressed. Certain heat transfer vinyl can be layered to form multi-colored designs. The more layers involved, the harder it is to match up each to achieve the end result. Heat transfer vinyl cannot be used for full-color pictures or anything with gradients. There are other applications for those options.

Heat transfer vinyl, in sizes, ranges from small sheets to large "master" rolls, that can go up to 60" x 50 yards. Typical sizes are 15" and 19" wide rolls in 1 yard, 5 yard, 10 yard, 25 yard, and 50-yard lengths. In metric territories, widths are typically 200, 300 and 500 millimetres, sold per the metre or in increments i.e. 5, 10, 25, 50, 75 and 100 metre "logs", priced according to economy of scale.

The film is typically 20 to 100 micrometres thick, although specifications vary as to whether this includes the adhesive layer or not. In recent years, very thin vinyls have become available with improvements in the polymer extrusion and calendering process, which varies by manufacturer.

== Usage ==
Heat transfer vinyl is traditionally placed on textile products. Because of the nature of the way the vinyl is applied, it must be used on products that can take the heat and pressure required to make the transfer adhere properly. For fabrics and clothing, typically this is temperatures in the range of 250-300 deg Fahrenheit, or 120-150 degrees Celsius. The product (also known as a substrate) will also need to hold up under the clamping action and pressure of the heat press.

Each heat transfer vinyl manufacturer will list what products can be used for each type of vinyl. Fabrics such as cotton, cotton/polyester blends, polyester, and canvas work well with heat transfer vinyl. There are types of vinyl that can also be used with nylon and leather. However, products such as paper and plastics do not work well because they cannot take the heat required to adhere the vinyl to the substrate.

== Equipment ==
Equipment needed to work with heat transfer vinyl includes design software and a vinyl cutter. Desktop cutters are suitable for low volume and low budget while standalone cutters are more appropriate for higher volumes. Print/cut printers have the ability to do printed vinyl.

Weeding tools are used to remove the heat transfer vinyl that is not going to be pressed onto the product from its adhesive carrier sheet. A heat press or iron is used to transfer the vinyl onto the product. Heat presses have the ability to set a specific temperature and pressure level to suit a specific vinyl and is recommended for professional results.
