= Duo-Tang =

Brand name for paper folders made of cardstock paper

Duo-Tang was a brand name for paper folders made of cardstock paper. They are used to bind multiple sheets of paper by bending embedded brass fasteners through the holes of the paper and folding them down to keep them in place. Some models have three teeth on the fastener, and some have six (two on the top, middle and bottom). They were produced in colors such as blue, green, red, orange, yellow and black. They were often used as an organization tool for multiple pages of one subject, chiefly by elementary school students (however, many students usually transition to binders as they enter secondary school).

Duo-Tang folders were manufactured by the Duo-Tang company, founded in Chicago in 1931 then moved to Paw Paw, Michigan after World War II. The brand was bought on July 1, 2004 by Esselte.

All previous Duo-Tang products were subsequently replaced by Oxford / Esselte products or otherwise discontinued.

In Canada, the word duotang is used to refer to any such style of folder regardless of the actual brand (see genericized trademark).
