= Vinyl cutter =

Machine for cutting vinyl

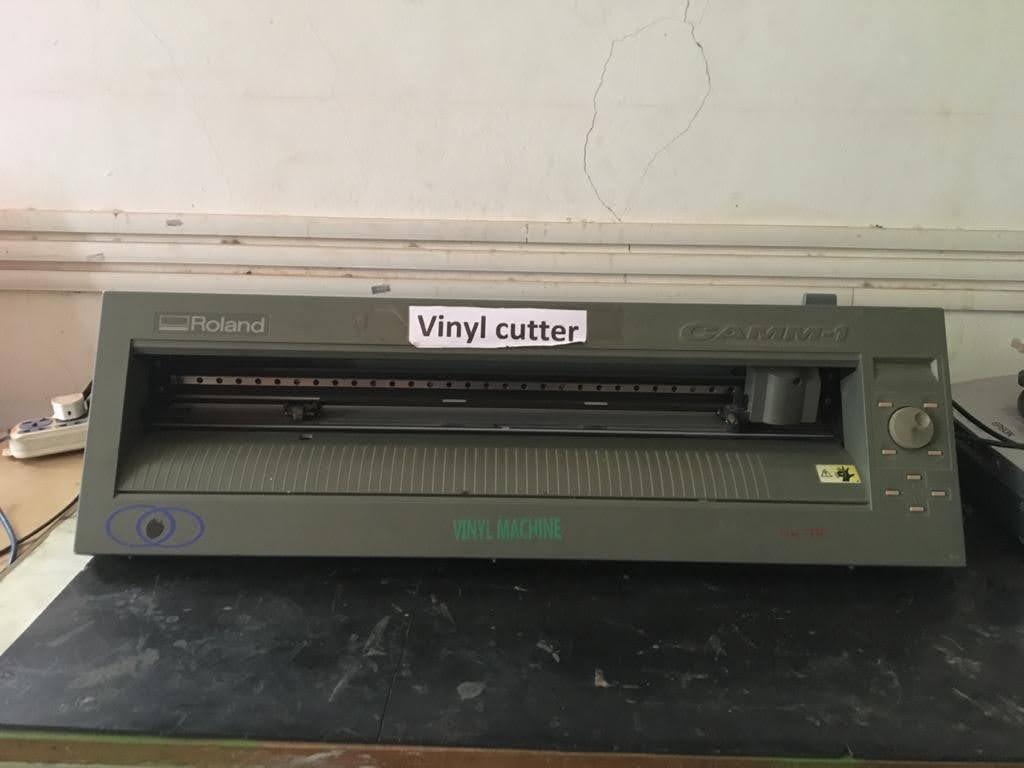
A vinyl cutter

A vinyl cutter is an entry-level machine for making signs. Computer-designed vector files with patterns and letters are directly cut on the roll of vinyl which is mounted and fed into the vinyl cutter through USB or serial cable. Vinyl cutters are mainly used to make signs, banners and advertisements. Advertisements seen on automobiles and vans are often made with vinyl cut letters. While these machines were designed for cutting vinyl, they can also cut through computer and specialty papers, as well as thicker items like thin sheets of magnet.

In addition to sign business, vinyl cutters are commonly used for apparel decoration. To decorate apparel, a vector design needs to be cut in mirror image, weeded, and then heat applied using a commercial heat press or a hand iron for home use.

Some businesses use their vinyl cutter to produce both signs and custom apparel. Many crafters also have vinyl cutters for home use. These require little maintenance, and the vinyl can be bought in bulk relatively cheaply.

Vinyl cutters are also often used by stencil artists to create single use or reusable stencil art and lettering

== How it works ==
A vinyl cutter is a type of computer-controlled machine tool. The computer controls the movement of a sharp blade over the surface of the material as it would the nozzles of an ink-jet printer. This blade is used to cut out shapes and letters from sheets of thin self-adhesive plastic (vinyl). The vinyl can then be stuck to a variety of surfaces depending on the adhesive and type of material.

To cut out a design, a vector-based image must be created using vector drawing software. Some vinyl cutters are marketed to small in-home businesses and require download and use of a proprietary editing software. The design is then sent to the cutter where it cuts along the vector paths laid out in the design. The cutter is capable of moving the blade on an X and Y axis over the material, cutting it into the required shapes. The vinyl material comes in long rolls allowing projects with significant length like banners or billboards to be easily cut.

A major limitation with vinyl cutters is that they can only cut shapes from solid colours of vinyl, paper, card or thin plastic sheets such as Mylar. The type and thickness of material will vary for each cutter and how much downforce the cutter is capable of. If the material has no backing, a backing sheet, material or cutting mat and a temporary adhesive are needed to allow the cutter to cut through the material.

A design with multiple colours must have each colour cut separately and then layered on top of each other as it is applied to the substrate. This is a process that is often applied in stencil art. Also, since the shapes are cut out of solid colours, photographs and gradients cannot be reproduced with a stand-alone cutter.

=== Design creation ===
Designs are created using vector-based software like Adobe Illustrator, FlexiSign, EasyCutPro, or other software. Vector artwork is either drawn with lines, shapes and text or images are vectorized thus create vector shapes. Most cutters (also called plotters) require special software to load/edit the artwork and communicate with the cutter.

Computer designed images are loaded onto the vinyl cutter via a wired connection or over a wireless protocol. Then the vinyl is loaded into the machine where it is automatically fed through and cut to follow the set design. The vinyl can be placed on an adhesive mat to stabilize the vinyl when cutting smaller designs.

=== Types of vinyl ===
Adhesive vinyl is the type of vinyl used for store windows, car decals, signage, and more. Adhesive vinyl is applied with a transfer medium often called "transfer tape" or "carrier sheet".

Heat transfer vinyl is the type of vinyl used to apply a design to fabric including t-shirts, tea towels, canvas bags, and more. Heat transfer vinyl can be applied using a heat press or an iron, though the constant pressure and heat from a heat press is recommended by experts.

=== Using other materials ===
In addition to vinyl some cutters are capable of cutting other materials such as paper, card, plastic sheets and even thin wood. The thickness and type of material that can be cut will depend on the model of the cutter and heavily depends on the downforce. Cricut is a popular home cutter used by arts and craft enthusiasts since it allows for a wide use of different materials and is similar in size to a household printer and has strong downforce for its size.

=== Backing and cutting mat ===
If you cut material that doesn't have an adhesive backing you will require a cutting mat that you need to attach your material to. Some cutting mats are sticky, others will require you to use a temporary adhesive and/or masking tape to keep the material in place when cutting.

=== Cutting ===
The vinyl cutter uses a small knife or blade to precisely cut the outline of figures into a sheet or piece of vinyl, but not the release liner. The process of cutting vinyl material without penetrating it completely is referred to as "kiss cutting". The knife moves side to side and turns, while the vinyl is moved beneath the knife. The results from the cut process is an image cut into the material.

=== Weeding ===
The material is then 'weeded' where the excess parts of the figures are removed from the release liner. It is possible to remove the positive parts, which would give a negative decal, or remove the negative parts, giving a positive decal. Removing the figure would be like removing the positive, giving a negative image of the figures.

=== Transfer tape ===
A sheet of transfer tape with an adhesive backing is laid on the weeded vinyl when necessary. Heat Transfer vinyl often does not require use of a separate transfer tape. A roller is applied to the tape, causing it to adhere to the vinyl. The transfer tape and the weeded vinyl is pulled off the release liner, and applied to a substrate, such as a sheet of aluminium. This results in an aluminium sign with vinyl figures.

== Uses ==
In addition to the capabilities of the cutter itself, adhesive vinyl comes in a wide variety of colors and materials including gold and silver foil, vinyl that simulates frosted glass, holographic vinyl, reflective vinyl, thermal transfer material, and even clear vinyl embedded with gold leaf. (Often used in the lettering on fire trucks and rescue vehicles.) As the vinyl film is supplied by the manufacturer, it comes attached to a release liner.

== Challenges when cutting on a vinyl cutter ==
Cutting on a vinyl cutter requires careful calibration to achieve clean and accurate results, especially when the goal is to cut through only the top layer of material while leaving the backing intact. One of the most common challenges is setting the correct cutting depth. If the blade is not lowered enough, the vinyl material may not separate properly; if it goes too deep, it can cut through the backing layer and potentially damage the cutting mat. The cutting depth on the vinyl cutter machines typically does not exceed 1 mm.

Another frequent issue is the mismatch between the blade and the type of material being processed. Using an inappropriate blade can lead to uneven cuts, premature dulling of the edge, and torn or frayed material. The overall quality of the output also depends on factors such as the cutting speed, blade sharpening and cutting angle, and the material the knife is made of.

== See also ==
- Cutting mat
- Laser cutter
