= Cricut =

American-based brand of cutting plotter

Cricut, Inc.
- Cricut logo
- Type: Public
- Traded as: Nasdaq: CRCT (Class A)
- Industry: Consumer electronics
- Headquarters: South Jordan, Utah, United States
- Key people: Ashish Arora (president & CEO); Kimball Shill (CFO)
- Products: Cutting plotters, heat press
- Revenue: ▼US$709 million (2025)
- Net income: ▲US$76.7 million (2025)
- Number of employees: 690
- Website: cricut.com/en/

Cricut, Inc. is an American brand of cutting plotters, or computer-controlled cutting machines, designed for home crafters. The machines are used for cutting paper, felt, vinyl, fabric and other materials such as leather, matboard, and wood.

== Models ==
The original Cricut machine has cutting mats of 150 mm × 300 mm (6 in × 12 in), the larger Cricut Explore allows mats of 300 mm × 300 mm, and 300 mm × 610 mm (12 in × 12 in, and 12 in × 24 in). The largest machine will produce letters from a 13 to 597 mm (0.5 to 23.5 in) high. Both the Cricut and Cricut Explore Air 2 require mats and blades which can be adjusted to cut through various types of paper, vinyl and other sheet products. The Cricut operates as a paper cutter based upon cutting parameters programmed into the machine, and resembles a desktop printer.

Model comparison
Model	Max cut size	Max cut speed	Date introduced	Support dropped	Still usable?	Features	Operating modes
Personal CRV001	150 mm × 300 mm (6 in × 12 in)		January 2005	2013	With cartridges and third party extension for sure cuts a lot	Manual cut depth and speed	Cartridges; Design Studio
Expression CREX001	300 mm × 610 mm (12 in × 24 in)		November 2005	2013	With cartridges and third party extension for sure cuts a lot	Manual cut depth and speed	Cartridges; Design Studio
Expression 2 CREX002	300 mm × 610 mm (12 in × 24 in)		September 2011	2018	With cartridges only		Cartridges; Craft Room
MINI CMNI001	220 mm × 300 mm (8.5 in × 12 in)		September 2011	2018	No longer usable, as Craft Room servers are offline since 2018		Cartridges; Craft Room
Explore CXPL001	300 mm × 610 mm (12 in × 24 in)		2014			Holds 2 tools	Design Space
Explore One CXPL101	300 mm × 610 mm (12 in × 24 in)		May 2015			Holds 1 tool	Design Space
Explore Air CXPL201	300 mm × 610 mm (12 in × 24 in)					Holds 2 tools	Design Space
Explore Air 2 CXPL202	290 mm × 600 mm (11.5 in × 23.5 in)	0.14 m/s (5.7 in/s)	October 2016			Automatic support for 6 tools, and 100+ materials	Design Space
Maker CXPL301	290 mm × 600 mm (11.5 in × 23.5 in)		August 2017			Automatic support for 13 tools, and 300+ materials	Design Space
Joy JCTR101	110 mm (4.5 in) by 1.2 m (4 ft)	5 in/s	March 2020			Automatic support for 3 tools, and 50+ materials	Design Space
Explore 3 CXPL203	300 mm (11.7 in) by 3.7 m (12 ft)	0.29 m/s (11.3 in/s)	June 2021			Automatic support for 6 tools, and 100+ materials	Design Space
Maker 3 CXPL303	300 mm (11.7 in) by 3.7 m (12 ft)	0.29 m/s (11.3 in/s)	June 2021			Automatic support for 13 tools, and 300+ materials	Design Space
Venture	610 mm (24 in) by 23 m (75 ft)	0.65 m/s (25.4 in/s)	July 2023			Automatic support for 7 tools, and 100+ materials	Design Space
Joy Xtra	220 mm (8.5 in) by 1.2 m (4 ft)	0.144 m/s (5.65 in/s)	September 2023			Automatic support for 3 tools, and 50+ materials	Design Space
Explore 4	300 mm (11.7 in) by 3.7 m (12 ft)	0.358 m/s (14.1in/s)	February 2025			Automatic support for 6 tools, and 100+ materials	Design Space
Maker 4	300 mm (11.7 in) by 3.7 m (12 ft)	0.358 m/s (14.1in/s)	February 2025			Automatic support for 13 tools, and 300+ materials	Design Space
Explore 5			February 2026			Automatic support for 6 tools and 100+ materials	Design Space
Joy 2	110 mm (4.5 in) by 1.2 m (4 ft)		February 2026			Automatic support for 3 tools and 75+ materials	
Maker 5	Max cut size using 12x12 mat: 11.5 in x 11.5 in (29.2 cm x 29.2 cm) Max cut size using 12x24 mat: 11.5 x 23.75 (29.2 cm x 60.3 cm) Max cut size using Smart Materials™: 12 in x 12 ft (30.5 cm x 3.6 m)	0.358 m/s (14.1in/s)	September 2026			Automatic support for 13 tools, and 300+ materials	

== Cartridges ==
Designs are made from components stored on cartridges. Each cartridge comes with a keyboard overlay and instruction booklet. The plastic keyboard overlay indicates key selections for that cartridge only. However, Provo Craft has released a "Universal Overlay" that is compatible with all cartridges released after August 1, 2013. The purpose of the universal overlay is to simplify the process of cutting by only having to learn one keyboard overlay instead of having to learn the overlay for each individual cartridge. Designs can be cut out on a PC with the Cricut Design Studio software, on a USB connected Gypsy machine, or can be directly inputted on the Cricut machine using the keyboard overlay. There are two types of cartridges, shape and font. Each cartridge provides for hundreds of different cuts. In 2011, a total of 275 cartridges were made available, with new ones regularly released. While some cartridges are generic in content, Cricut has licensing agreements with Disney, Pixar, Nickelodeon, Sesame Street, DC Comics and Hello Kitty. The cartridges are interchangeable, although not all options on a cartridge may be available with the smaller machines.

In 2017, physical cartridges were discontinued for digital cartridges.

== Heat presses ==
In 2017, Cricut created a category of handheld heat transfer products starting with the Cricut EasyPress. Cricut now offers heat presses and accessories for a variety of applications ranging from personal projects to commercial use. These press families are the Cricut EasyPress (available in 230 mm × 230 mm (9 in × 9 in), 300 mm × 250 mm (12 in × 10 in), and Mini), Mug Press, Hat Press, and Autopress.

== Lighting ==
The Cricut Bright 360 LED lamp was introduced in early 2022 and comes in table and floor models. Both models boast four points of articulation, adjustable surface brightness up to 1500 lux (table lamp) or 3000 lux (floor lamp), light color temperature from warm to cool white, and a color rendering index (CRI) of 95.

Cricut also offers two portable craft light boxes: the BrightPad and BrightPad Go.

== Software ==
=== Proprietary ===
To use Cricut cutters, users must use the company's own web-based design software, Design Space, which allows users to draw designs, select and combine designs from its own online library, or upload vector or bitmap files they have created in other software.

=== Past software ===
Cricut's first software was Cricut design studio. Released November 15, 2005, it allowed users to combine images from different cartridges, merge images, and stretch/rotate images; it does not allow for the creation of arbitrary designs. Support was dropped sometime in 2013.

The Cricut Craft Room software enabled users to combine images from different cartridges, merge images, and stretch/rotate images; it does not allow for the creation of arbitrary designs. It also enables the user to view the images displayed on-screen before beginning the cutting process, so the result can be seen in advance.

Citing Adobe's abandonment of Flash, Cricut announced it would be closing Cricut Craft Room on July 15, 2018. Users of "legacy" machines were offered a discount to update to models compatible with Design Space, however, made legacy machines incompatible with Design Space only usable as a standalone device with cartridges. As of July 16, 2018, Design Space is the only official software available to compose projects. Some third party programs are available and can be used to input the files into Design Space.

== Controversies ==
=== Third-party hostility ===
Provo Craft has been actively hostile to the use of third-party software programs that could enable Cricut owners to cut out designs and to use the machine without depending on its proprietary cartridges. In a comparative review of die-cutting machines, review site TopTenReviews identified being "limited to cutting designs from a collection of cartridges" as a major drawback of the Cricut range, though the review noted that it could be a preference for some.

Two programs which could formerly be used to make and then get Cricut machines to cut out arbitrary designs (using, for example, arbitrary TrueType fonts or SVG format graphics) were Make-the-Cut (MTC) and Craft Edge's Sure Cuts A Lot (SCAL). In April 2010, Provo Craft opened legal action against the publishers of Make-the-Cut, and in January 2011, it sued Craft Edge to stop the distribution of the SCAL program. In both cases the publishers settled with Provo Craft, and removed support for Cricut from their products. The programs continue to be usable with other home cutters.

According to the text of its legal complaint against Craft Edge, "Provo Craft uses various techniques to encrypt and obscure the USB communications between Cricut DesignStudio [a design program supplied with the hardware] and the Cricut e-cutter, in order to protect Provo Craft's proprietary software and firmware, and to prevent attempts to intercept the cutting commands". Provo Craft contended that in order to understand and replicate this obscured protocol, Craft Edge had disassembled the DesignStudio program, contrary to the terms of its end-user license agreement, thereby (the company asserted) breaching copyright law. Provo Craft also asserted that Craft Edge were violating its trademark in the word "Cricut" by saying that its software could work with Cricut machines. Provo Craft asserted that this was likely "to cause confusion, mistake or deception as to the source or origin of Defendant's goods or services, and [was] likely to falsely suggest a sponsorship, connection, license, or association of Defendant's goods and services with Provo Craft".

=== User upload limitation ===
On March 12, 2021, Cricut announced it would soon start limiting users without a Cricut Access subscription to 20 free uploads per month to Design Space. All previous uploads, which prior to this date had been unlimited for all users, would have remained available, but new uploads would have the limit imposed for free users. Because the Cricut machines are dependent on Design Space, Cricut's proprietary cloud-based image service, to upload and work with user-generated content, this change would effectively have required its customers to purchase a monthly subscription to use their machines past the most basic of use-cases.

The announcement was criticized by users at the company's unofficial subreddit and other mediums, as people saw it as a form of vendor lock-in. A petition was launched in protest. News organizations soon picked up on the story and began reporting about the imposed subscription requirement, causing further uproar. Following the backlash, Cricut's CEO apologized, and Cricut soon after scrapped the plans.
