= Utility knife =

Knife used for general or utility purposes

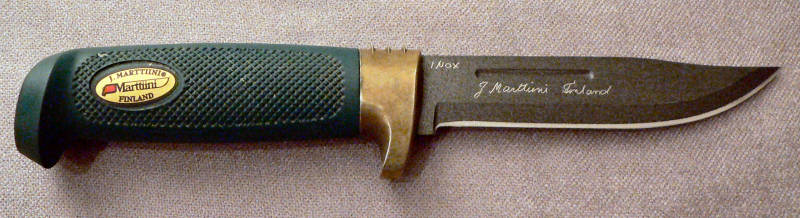
Finnish outdoor utility knife, puukko

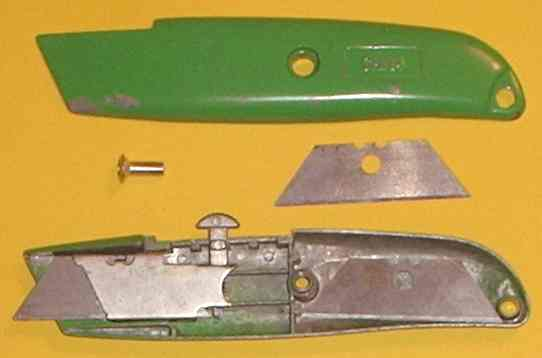
Retractable blade knife with replaceable utility blade

A utility knife is any type of knife used for general manual work purposes. Such knives were originally fixed-blade knives with durable cutting edges suitable for rough work such as cutting cordage, cutting/scraping hides, butchering animals, cleaning fish scales, reshaping timber, and other tasks. Craft knives are small utility knives used as precision-oriented tools for finer, more delicate tasks such as carving and papercutting.

Today, the term "utility knife" also includes small folding-, retractable- and/or replaceable-blade knives suited for use in the general workplace or in the construction industry. The latter type is sometimes generically called a Stanley knife, after a prominent brand designed by the American tool manufacturing company Stanley Works (subsequently merged into Stanley Black & Decker).

There is also a utility knife for kitchen use, which is sized between a chef's knife and paring knife.

== History ==
The fixed-blade utility knife was developed some 500,000 years ago, when human ancestors began to make stone knives. These knives were general-purpose tools, designed for cutting and shaping wooden implements, scraping hides, preparing food, and for other utilitarian purposes.

By the 19th century the fixed-blade utility knife had evolved into a steel-bladed outdoors field knife capable of butchering game, cutting wood, and preparing campfires and meals. With the invention of the backspring, pocket-size utility knives were introduced with folding blades and other folding tools designed to increase the utility of the overall design. The folding pocketknife and utility tool is typified by the Camper or Boy Scout pocketknife, the Swiss Army Knife, and by multi-tools fitted with knife blades. The development of stronger locking blade mechanisms for folding knives—as with the Spanish navaja, the Opinel, and the Buck 110 Folding Hunter—significantly increased the utility of such knives when employed for heavy-duty tasks such as preparing game or cutting through dense or tough materials.

== Contemporary utility knives ==
A Stanley 99E utility knife, fully retracted

The fixed or folding blade utility knife is popular for both indoor and outdoor use. One of the most popular types of workplace utility knife is the retractable or folding utility knife (also known as a Stanley knife, box cutter, or by various other names). These types of utility knives are designed as multi-purpose cutting tools for use in a variety of trades and crafts. Designed to be lightweight and easy to carry and use, utility knives are commonly used in factories, warehouses, construction projects, and other situations where a tool is routinely needed to mark cut lines, trim plastic or wood materials, or to cut tape, cord, strapping, cardboard, or other packaging material.

== Names ==
In British, Australian and New Zealand English a utility knife is referred to as a Stanley knife. This name is a generic trademark named after Stanley Works, a manufacturer of such knives. In Israel and Switzerland, these knives are known as Japanese knives. In Brazil they are known as estiletes or cortadores Olfa (Olfa being another genericised trademark). In Portugal, Panama and Canada they are also known as X-Acto (yet another genericised trademark ). In India, Russia, the Philippines, France, Iraq, Italy, Egypt, and Germany, they are simply called cutter. In the Flemish region of Belgium it is called cuttermes(je) (cutter knife). In general Spanish, they are known as cortaplumas (penknife, when it comes to folding blades); in Spain, Mexico, and Costa Rica, they are colloquially known as cutters; in Argentina and Uruguay the segmented fixed-blade knives are known as "Trinchetas". In Turkey, they are known as maket bıçağı (which literally translates as model knife).

Other names for the tool are box cutter or boxcutter, blade knife, carpet knife, pen knife, stationery knife, sheetrock knife, or drywall knife.

== Design ==
Utility knives may use fixed, folding, or retractable or replaceable blades, and come in a wide variety of lengths and styles suited to the particular set of tasks they are designed to perform. Thus, an outdoors utility knife suited for camping or hunting might use a broad 75 to 130 millimetres (3–5 in) fixed blade, while a utility knife designed for the construction industry might feature a replaceable utility blade for cutting packaging, cutting shingles, marking cut lines, or scraping paint.

=== Fixed blade utility knife ===
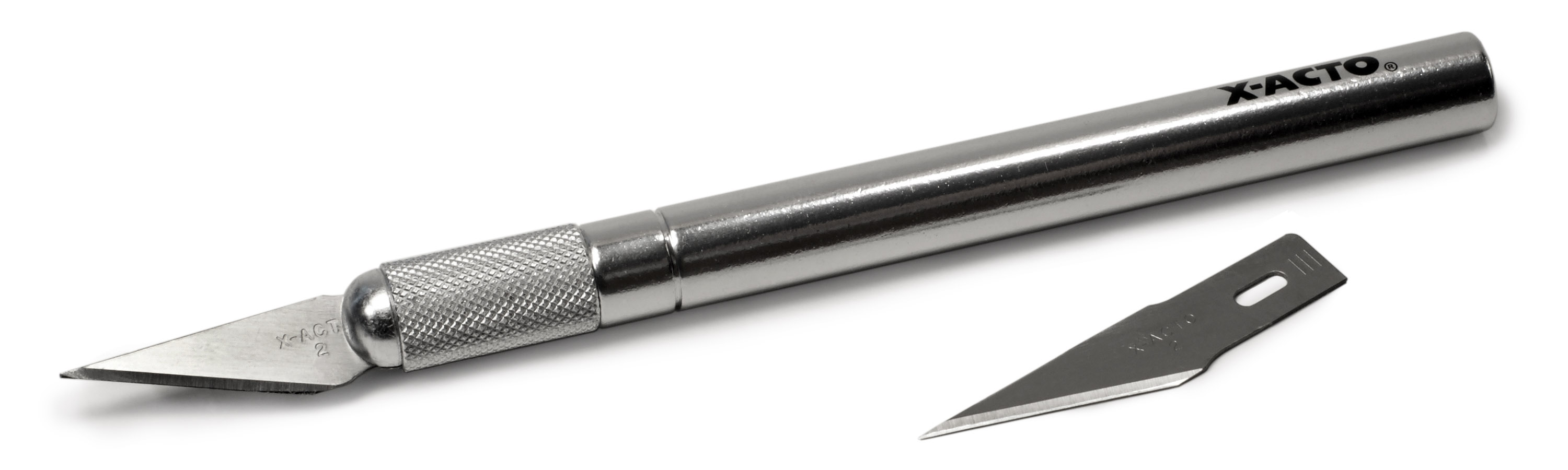
Fixed-blade X-Acto knife for handicrafts and model making

Large fixed-blade utility knives are most often employed in an outdoors context, such as fishing, camping, or hunting. Outdoor utility knives typically feature sturdy blades from 100 to 150 millimetres (4–6 in) in length, with edge geometry designed to resist chipping and breakage.

The term "utility knife" may also refer to small fixed-blade knives used for crafts, model-making and other artisanal projects. These small knives feature light-duty blades best suited for cutting thin, lightweight materials. The small, thin blade and specialized handle permit cuts requiring a high degree of precision and control.

=== Retractable utility knife ===
Construction utility knives, typically made from die-cast metal or robust molded plastic, have retractable and replaceable blades. The user of the knife can adjust the distance that the blade extends from the handle. For example, cutting the tape that seals a package without damaging the contents requires the blade to be extended slightly, while cutting the cardboard box requires the blade to be extended further forward.

A utility blade that has become dull can be reversed or replaced with a new one. Spare or used utility blades can be stored in the handle of some utility knife models and can be accessed by removing a bolt and opening the handle. There are also models of utility knives equipped with a quick-change feature that allows blades to be replaced without additional tools. Retractable utility knives are commonly used in construction, crafting, utility and warehouse work.

==== Utility knife blades ====
It is the material to be cut that determines which type of utility blade is required to be installed in the utility knife. In standard knives can be installed different forms of blades, varying and expanding the functionality of the knife. So the standard and universal option for craft and construction work is considered a trapezoidal blade, which is suitable for drywall, cardboard, cutting flooring covering materials, and more. There are also specialized blades for cutting roofing felt, linoleum, carpeting, foam, insulation and other building materials.

Standard blade types include:

- Trapezoidal blade: the sturdy blade is sharpened on both sides and has 2 pointed and sharp tips, so it can be turned over and reused. The most common replacement blade, suitable for universal use.
- Hook blade: a trapezoid-shaped blade that has hooks instead of pointed tips. Hook utility blades are suitable for cutting with a pulling motion such materials as roofing felt, linoleum, carpeting.
- Concave blade: similar to a hook blade, but has a more elongated hook on only one side. Suitable for cutting out details and forming shapes.

==== Snap-off utility knife ====
OLFA retractable utility knife with snap-off blade

Another type of utility knife is a snap-off utility knife that contains a long, segmented blade that slides out from it. As the endmost edge becomes dull, it can be broken off the remaining blade, exposing the next section, which is sharp and ready for use. The snapping is best accomplished with a blade snapper that is often built-in, or a pair of pliers, and the break occurs at the score lines, where the metal is thinnest. When all of the individual segments are used, the knife may be thrown away, or, more often, refilled with a replacement blade.

This design was introduced by Japanese manufacturer OLFA in 1956 as the world's first snap-off blade and was inspired from analyzing the sharp cutting edge produced when glass is broken and how pieces of a chocolate bar break into segments. The sharp cutting edge on these knives is not on the edge where the blade is snapped off; rather one long edge of the whole blade is sharpened, and there are scored diagonal breakoff lines at intervals down the blade. Thus each snapped-off piece is roughly a parallelogram, with each long edge being a breaking edge, and one or both of the short ends being a sharpened edge.

==== Box cutter knife ====
Another utility knife often used for cutting open boxes consists of a simple sleeve around a rectangular handle into which single-edge utility blades can be inserted. The sleeve slides up and down on the handle, holding the blade in place during use and covering the blade when not in use. The blade holder may either retract or fold into the handle, much like a folding-blade pocketknife. The blade holder is designed to expose just enough edge to cut through one layer of corrugated fibreboard, to minimize chances of damaging contents of cardboard boxes.

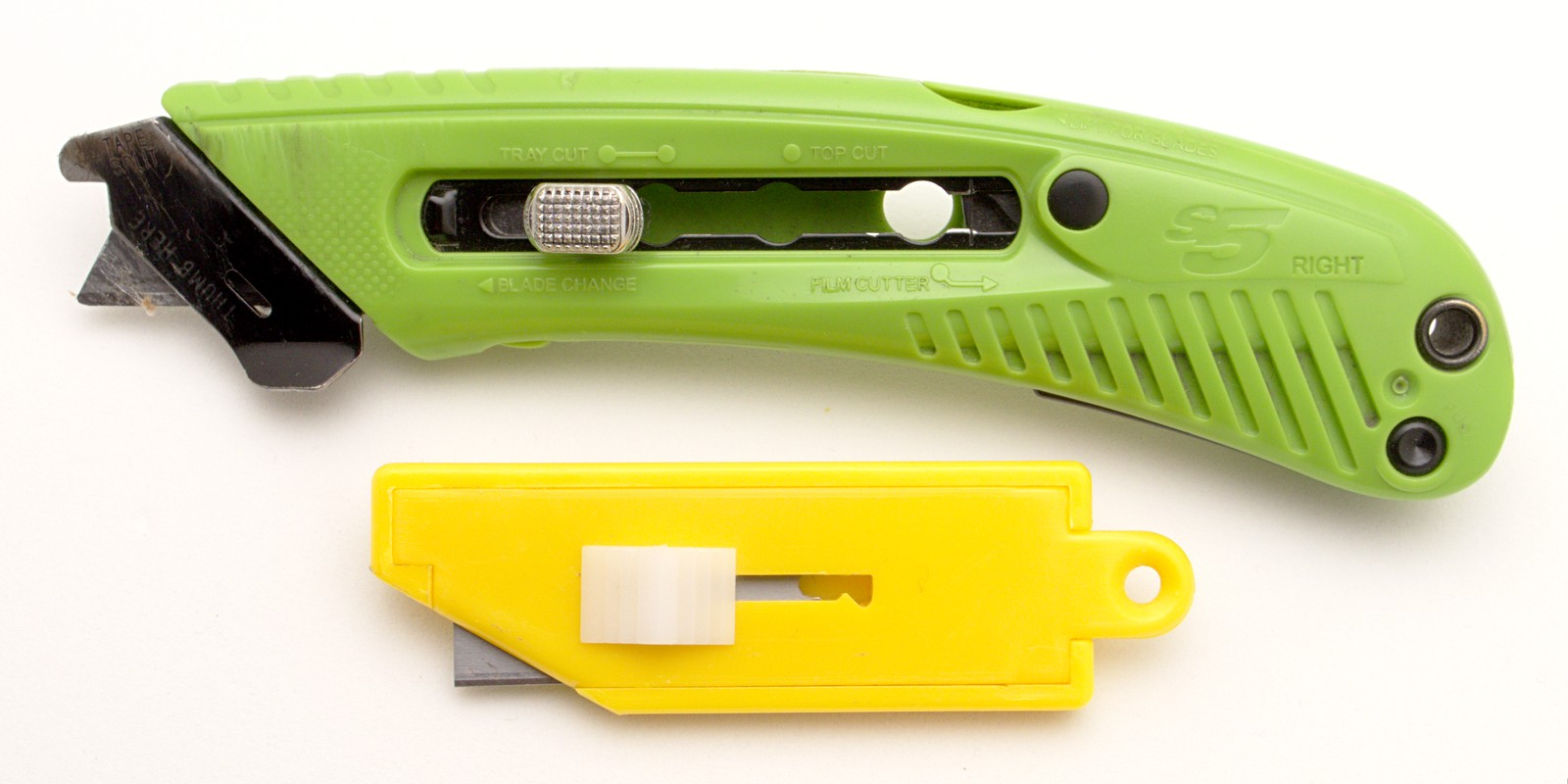
A modern safety cutter at top, with blunted tip blade and cutting guide/tape hook. At bottom, an older style simple plastic box cutter using standard straight edged blades.

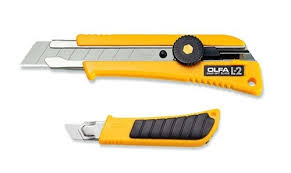
OLFA segmented blade or "snap-off blade" utility knife

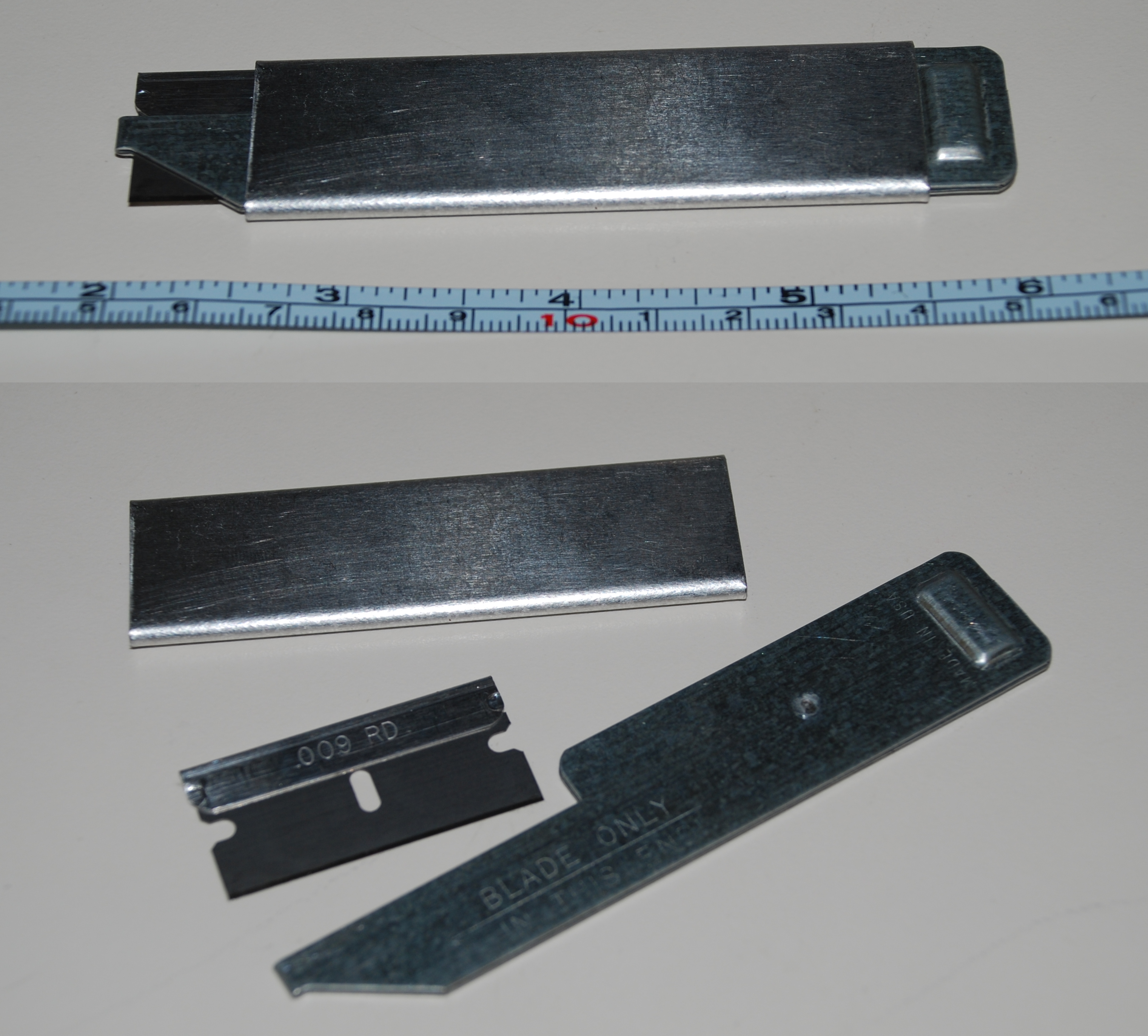
Inexpensive stamped steel and aluminum box cutter with disposable blade

== Use as weapon ==
Most utility knives are not well suited to use as offensive weapons, with the exception of some outdoor-type utility knives employing longer blades. However, even small blade type utility knives may sometimes find use as slashing weapons, particularly when used opportunistically due to their ubiquity. The 9/11 Commission report stated passengers in cell phone calls reported knives or "box-cutters" were used as weapons (also mace) in hijacking airplanes in the September 11, 2001 terrorist attacks against the United States, though the exact design of the knives used is unknown. Two of the hijackers were known to have purchased Leatherman knives, which feature a 4-inch (10 cm) slip-joint blade, which were not prohibited on U.S. flights at the time. Those knives were not found in the possessions the two hijackers left behind. Similar cutters, including paper cutters, have also been known to be used as a lethal weapon.

Small work-type utility knives have also been used to commit robbery and other crimes. In June 2004, a Japanese student was slashed to death with a segmented-type utility knife.

In the United Kingdom, the law was changed (effective 1 October 2007) to raise the age limit for purchasing knives, including utility knives, from 16 to 18, and to make it illegal to carry a utility knife in public without a good reason.

== See also ==
- Automatic box-opening technology
- Everyday carry
