= Shiny-floor show =

Television program broadcast from a studio

A shiny-floor show is a light entertainment television program that is recorded in or broadcast from the floor of a television studio, often in front of a live audience. The name derives from the flat floor of the studio, which is typically covered in a shiny temporary self-adhesive plastic overlay. Modern studios may have a laser-levelled black resin floor to allow multi-camera tracking.

Examples of shiny-floor shows include studio-based celebrity competition shows such as the BBC's Strictly Come Dancing, game shows such as BBC's The Weakest Link, and talent shows such as The Voice and The X Factor.
