= Rotary cutter =

Tool used by quilters to cut fabric

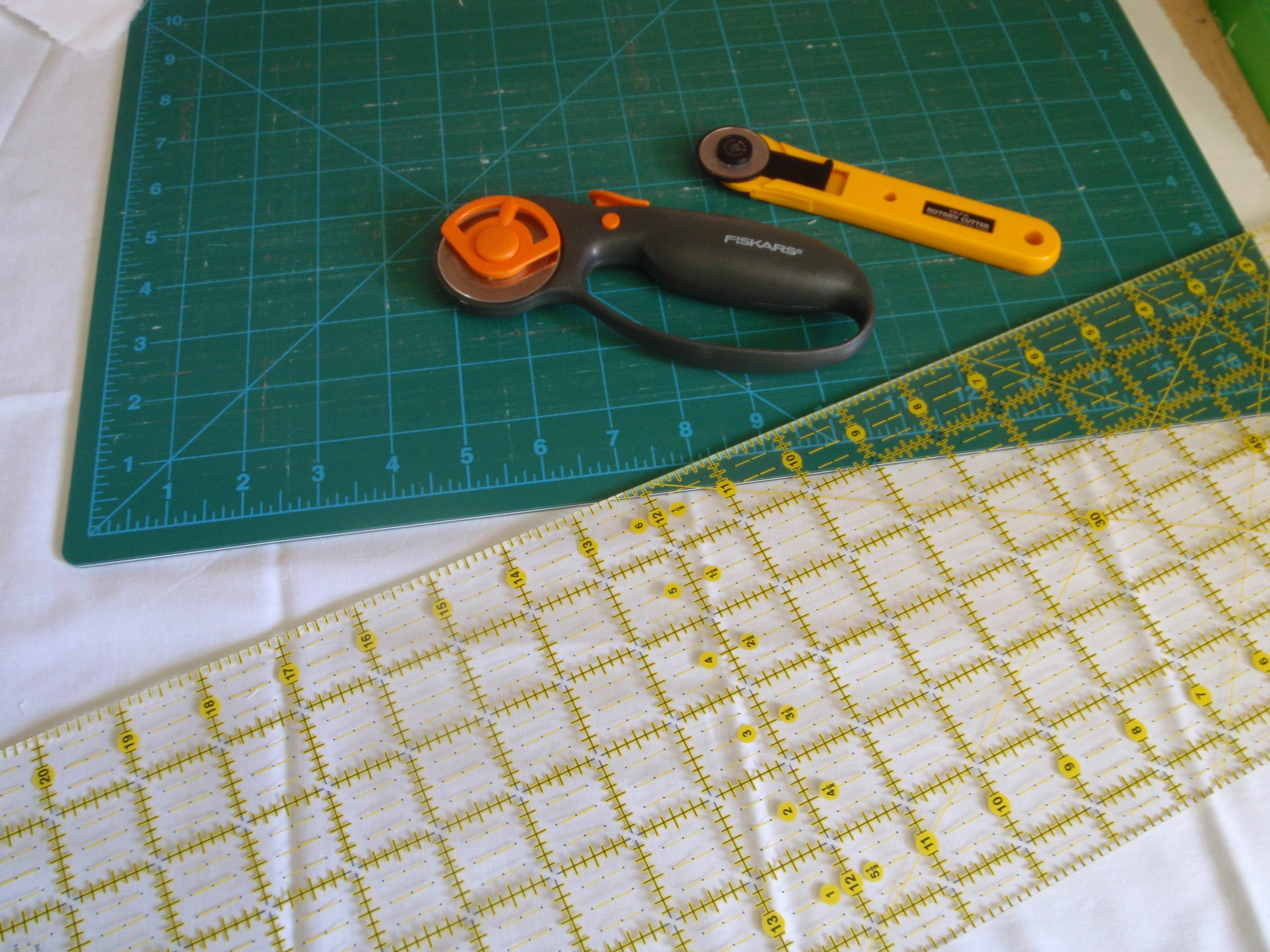
Rotary cutter in use on a cutting mat

A rotary cutter is a tool generally used by quilters to cut fabric. It consists of a handle with a circular blade that rotates, thus the tool's name. Rotary cutter blades are very sharp, can be resharpened, and are available in different sizes: usually smaller blades are used to cut small curves, while larger blades are used to cut to straight lines and broad curves. Several layers of fabric can be cut simultaneously with a sharp (fresh) blade, making it easier to cut out patchwork pieces of the same shape and size than with scissors. Quilters use rotary cutters with specially designed templates and rulers made of approximately 3.2 mm (0.125 in) thick clear or color-tinted plastic.

== History ==
The first rotary cutter was introduced by the OLFA company in 1979 for garment making, however, it was quickly adopted by quilters. Prior to the invention of the rotary cutter, quilters traced handmade templates of the necessary shapes onto the wrong side of the fabric and added 6.4 mm (0.25 in) seam allowances all around. Templates were often handmade of (cereal box type) cardboard and the pencil wore down the edges with repeated tracings, rendering them inaccurate; new templates would be made several times until all the patchwork pieces were cut. Pieces were usually cut one at a time with dressmaking scissors, which were often heavy and had long blades that were designed for cutting large pieces for garments but were cumbersome to use for cutting small pieces for patchwork. The rotary cutter gained almost immediate widespread use among quilters after its introduction and, along with the accompanying development of strip techniques, revolutionized quilting.

Today there are many companies making rotary cutters. Cutters come in a variety of handle types and some include specialty blades to cut curved or zigzagged lines. Most have retractable blades that can be locked to prevent injury.
