= Contact paper =

Adhesive paper used as a covering or lining

Contact paper is an adhesive paper used as a covering or lining.

== Description ==
Contact paper is an inexpensive material that has a decorative surface on one side and a highly adhesive material on the other side. The paper sticks to the desired surface with minimal effort. It is usually sold in roll form and the material is cut to size by the user. While its traditional use was as a shelf or drawer liner, or for covering cupboard doors, it can be used in many creative ways. Teachers often use it for creative projects at school. Other uses of contact paper include use as laptop skins and protective book covers.

== Types ==
Contact paper is usually categorized by the kind of surface that it is supposed to stick to. Some of the types of contact paper include:

- Adhesive contact paper
- Shelf liner contact paper
- Stainless steel contact paper
- Glass contact paper
- Vinyl contact paper

== Uses ==
- Commonly used to line or cover kitchen and bathroom cabinets and drawers, counter tops, bookshelves, closet shelving, and pantry areas
- Covering up or protecting areas which have become (or could become) stained or ruined because of a project. Examples include art projects, foods and liquids, destructive substances
- The clear variety can be used for laminating books, art projects, posters, pictures, or other objects
- As part of a collage

== Application ==
Most contact paper products feature an easy-to-peel liner and an adhesive that allows for repositioning of the material during installation. The material can be cut to size with scissors for custom applications depending on the requirement.

== See also ==
- Self-adhesive plastic sheet
