= X-Acto =

Brand of cutting tools and office products

- Founded: 1930; 96 years ago
- Founder: Sundel Doniger
- Headquarters: Westerville, Ohio, United States
- Products: Utility knives, office supplies
- Parent: Newell Brands
- Website: xacto.com

X-Acto is a brand name for a variety of cutting tools and office products owned by Newell Brands. These include hobby and utility knives, saws, carving tools and many small-scale precision knives used for crafts and other applications. An X-Acto knife may be called an Exacto knife, utility knife, precision knife, or hobby knife.

== History ==
The original knife was invented in the 1930s by Sundel Doniger, a Jewish Polish immigrant to the United States. He started a medical supply company in 1917 producing medical syringes and scalpels with removable blades. This would later be his inspiration for the X-Acto brand of knives. He had planned to sell it to surgeons as a scalpel but it was not acceptable, because it could not be cleaned. His brother-in-law, Daniel Glück (father of poet and 2020 Nobel Prize in Literature laureate Louise Glück), suggested that it might be a good craft tool.

In 1930, a house designer asked Doniger if he could create something for him that would help him crop some advertisements. Doniger agreed and created what is now known as the X-Acto Knife.

== Design ==
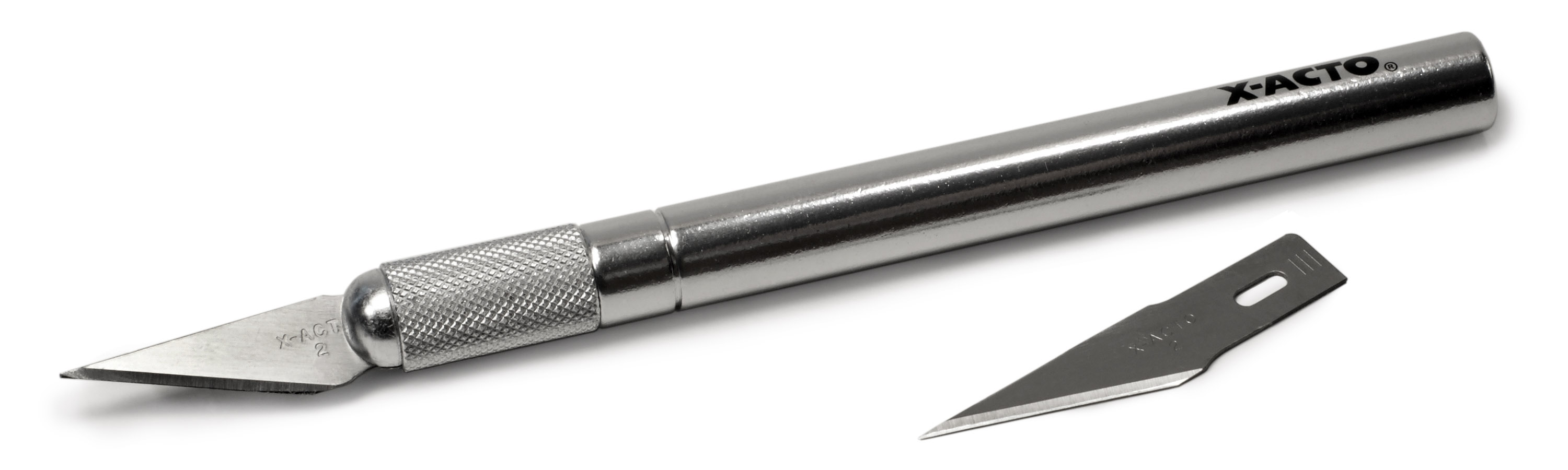
An X-Acto knife equipped with a "Number 2" blade

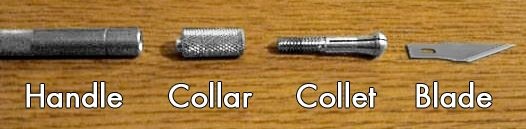
Parts of an X-Acto knife from left to right: (1) handle, (2) collar, (3) collet, (4) blade

An X-Acto knife is a blade mounted on a pen-like aluminum body. A knurled collar loosens and tightens an aluminum collet with one slot, which holds a replaceable blade.

There are numerous other knives on the market with very similar designs. Blades are typically interchangeable between different brands.

== Uses ==
X-Acto knives are generally used for crafting and hobbies, such as modelmaking.

Before the availability of desktop publishing tools, preparing copy for use in printing (literal cut and paste or paste up) depended heavily on the use of knives like the X-Acto for trimming and manipulating slips of paper.

== Other products ==
In addition to knives, blades, and tools, X-Acto produces office supplies including pencil sharpeners, paper trimmers, staplers, and hole punchers. X-Acto sharpeners are electric, battery, or manual. X-Acto has three types of trimmers: razor, rotary, and guillotine.

Through 2012, the company sold ceramic and convection space heaters and fans under the Boston brand name.

== See also ==
- Olfa – Japanese utility knife company
- Wood carving – Form of working wood by means of a cutting tool
