= Junk journal =

Modern hobby using recycled items

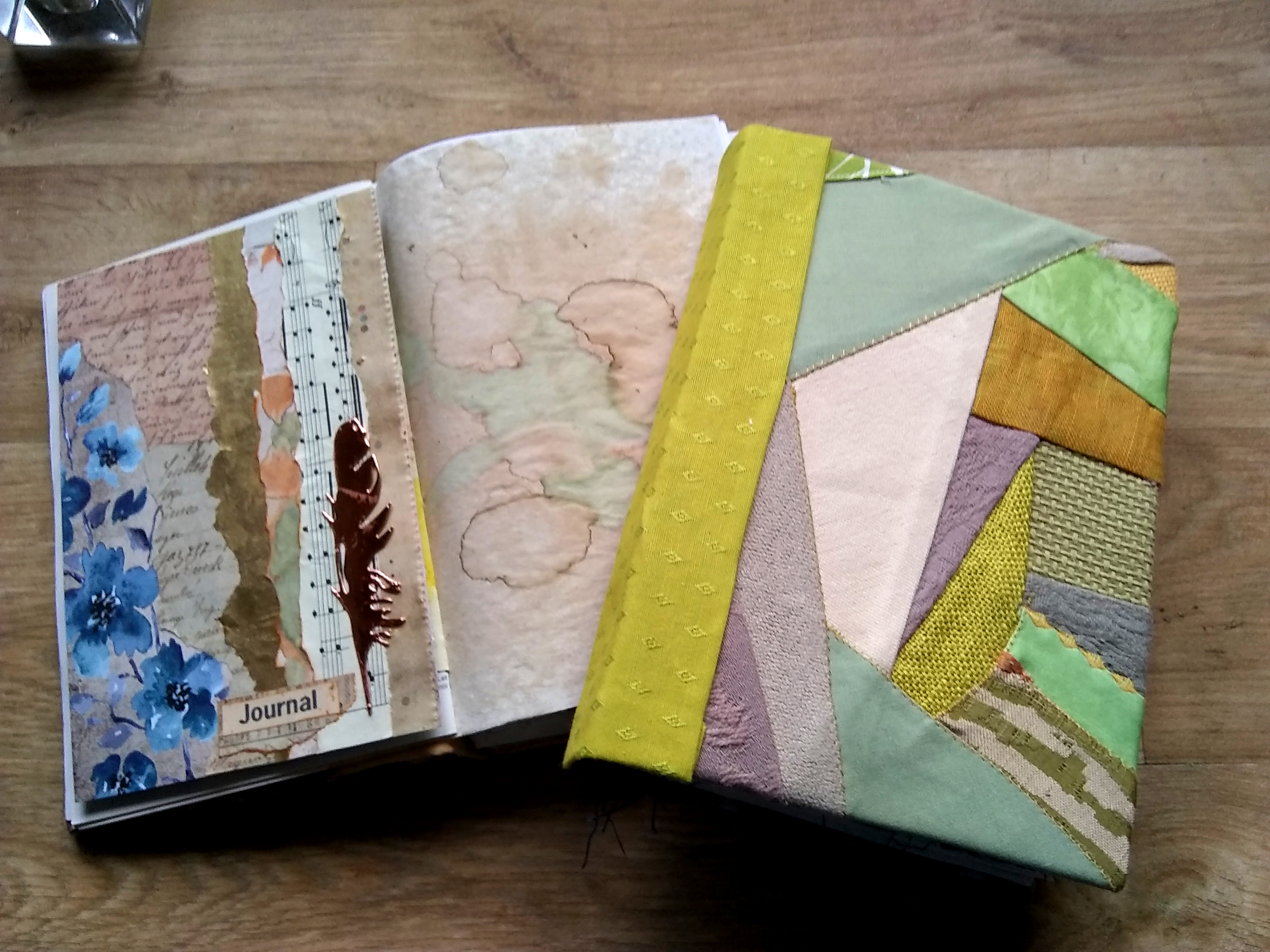
A handmade junk journal with a handmade quilted stitched cover, using scraps of fabric. Also showing tea stained and decorated pages from scrap paper

A junk journal is a handmade journal, of any size, composed of recycled or upcycled papers. Junk journals are generally constructed from old or unwanted materials, such as letters, papers, books, photos, invoices, or modern day "junk mail". The journal itself can be a stand-alone art piece or be used on a daily, weekly or monthly basis.

Junk journaling is a popular and relatively low-cost crafting hobby.

Francesca Radice suggests in her book Junk Journal Joy, that making junk journals out of recycled and affordable materials enhances well-being and is a therapeutic outlet to reduce stress.

== History ==
Modern junk journaling developed as a subgenre of scrapbooking and collage. The practice shares historical roots with the 19th-century tradition of scrapbooking momentos and the resourcefulness seen during economic recessions, such as the 1940s post war era. Author Justine Jenkins notes that during this period of material scarcity, "people took to making journals using whatever they could get their hands on at the time," repurposing everyday ephemera like, "newspapers, paper packaging, seed packets", for writing and drawing."

Journalist, Kaur Harmeet, notes that the craft also shares ties with 21st-century mixed media trends. Craft designer Jennifer Perkins, traces the form to interactive books such as Keri Smith’s 2007 publication Wreck this Journal, which encouraged users to unleash their creativity by filling and defacing its pages, and K&Company’s Smash Books, which prompted users to glue in items from their day-to-day lives.

== Purpose ==
Junk journals serve multiple purposes, including creative writing, sketching, collage and mixed media art. The process of creating the journal is often regarded as a distinct form of artistic expression and it has infinite creativity no matter what even though it may have a purpose for memories it could also just be there for fun.

In her book Treasure Book Making, Natasa Marinkovic explains that junk journaling is "transforming junk into treasure".

Junk journals are typically catergorised as themed or eclectic. Themed journals focus on a specific aethetic such as,vintage, art, seasonal, holidays, hobbies, grunge, modern themes. Conversely eclectic journals celebrate a diverse freestyle mix. All junk journals use everyday ephemera including, product packaging, pamphlets, clothing labels, vintage stamps.

Sammi Tapper wrote "After a spiral down Pinterest and TikTok, I learned that junk journaling is true to its name. Instead of being a place to organize your thoughts, this was a place to organize your junk."

The process of junk journaling is widely associated with therapeutic benefits including relaxation and stress relief. Author and creator Helen Colebrook highlights this perspective, writing: "A junk journal is probably the journal where I feel most relaxed, as the complete lack of any structure enables me to play, document and explore".

Felicia Bottos, a graphic designer, explains "Junk journalling can be whatever you want it to be." As she sees it, "there's only one rule in junk journalling: there are no rules!"

== Comparison with scrapbooking ==
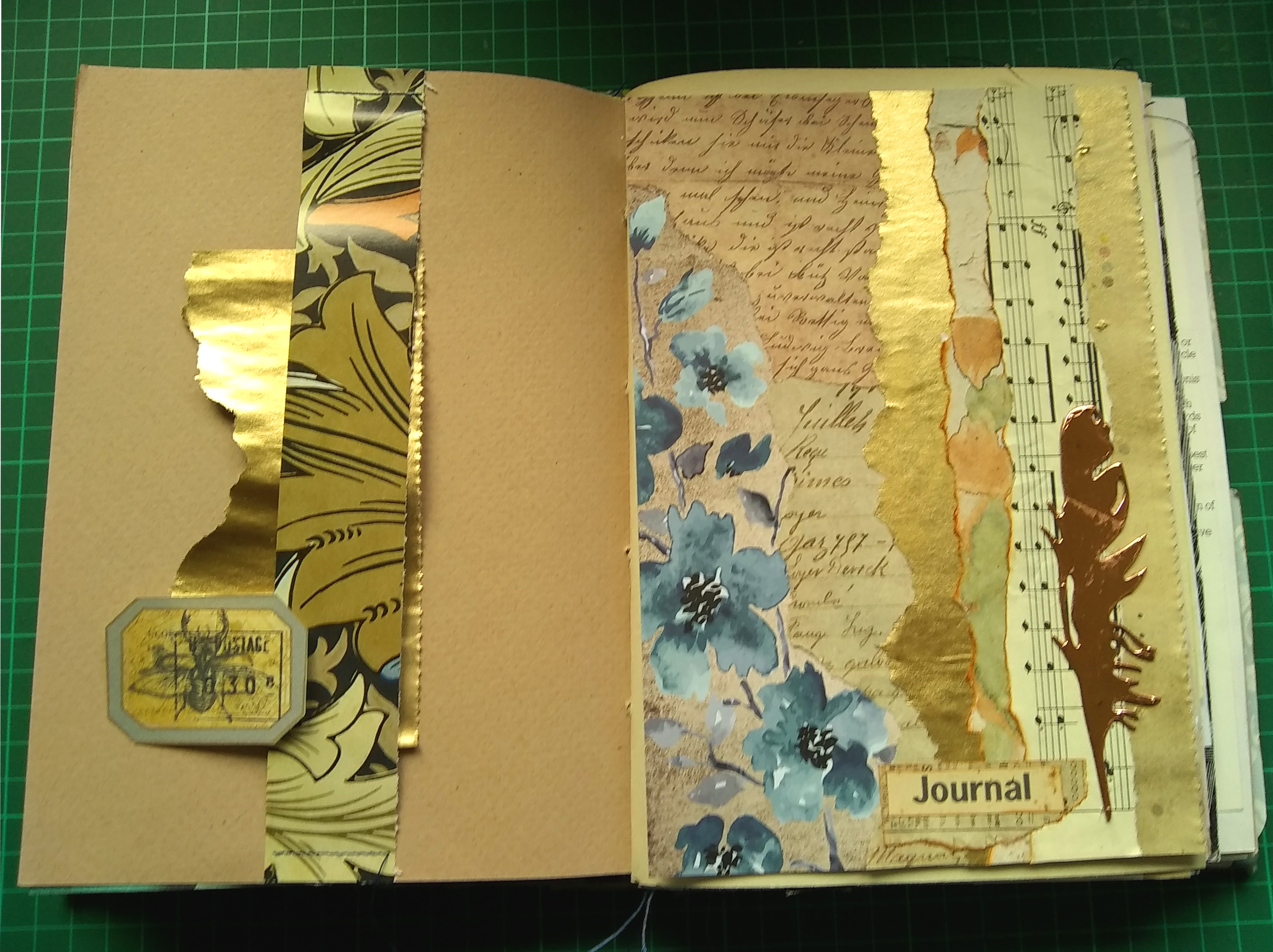
Decorated junk journal pages using scraps of paper creating a personal art style with layering, inking and collage.

While scrapbooks and junk journals are both used to collect paper and ephemera, they differ significantly in construction and intent. Scrapbooks are typically manufactured and more uniform with personal memorabilia, family histories, or specific events - such as holidays and hobbies. Researchers Susan Tucker, Katherine Ott, and Patricia Buckle write that scrapbooking has a long history of being used to store collections of personal memorabilia, from photos to tickets as a memory of a special occasion.

In contrast, junk journals are primarily handmade from non-uniform, repurposed materials. A junk journal can hold all types of unrelated ephemera. While a scrapbook focuses on the maker's own life, a junk journal may incorporate unrelated or anonymous ephemera, including vintage photographs, discarded product packaging, and ticket stubs. Junk journals also frequently include handmade ephemera made of various materials. The practice places a heavier emphasis on a freestyle, less precise artistic process, utilizing layering, inking and collage to express a personal aesthetic.

== Modern resurgence and social media ==
In the 21st century, junk journaling has developed into a global hobby with significant communities in countries including the US, UK, Australia. The growth of the craft is heavily tied to digital platforms; practitioners regularly share tutorials, flips-throughs, and photographs of their work on YouTube, TikTok, Pinterest and other social media platforms. This online presence has fostered a robust social network, leading to dedicated crafting groups and organized, in-person junk journalling retreats. Many groups form and meet in libraries and community halls, focusing on skill-sharing, community building and sharing materials.

Alice Cullinane writes, "Thousands of people around the world are using materials others could consider junk to create personal books full of memories and inspiration, known as junk journals"

== Equipment ==
The equipment used in junk journaling ranges from very basic household stationary to specialized crafting machinery. Essential tools typically include adhesives, scissors, pens, pencils and paints. As practitioners advance they often incorporate more specialized equipment, including cutting boards, specialist inks, card stock, printers and die cutting machines.

However, the acquisition of these materials has sparked discussion regarding the philosophy of the craft. Writer CT Jones notes, "just as junk journaling has begun to grow in popularity, so has the internet commodification of the trend... with hundreds of new crafters spending money on items to fill their journals, rather than actually using the trash they acquire in real life".

== Size ==
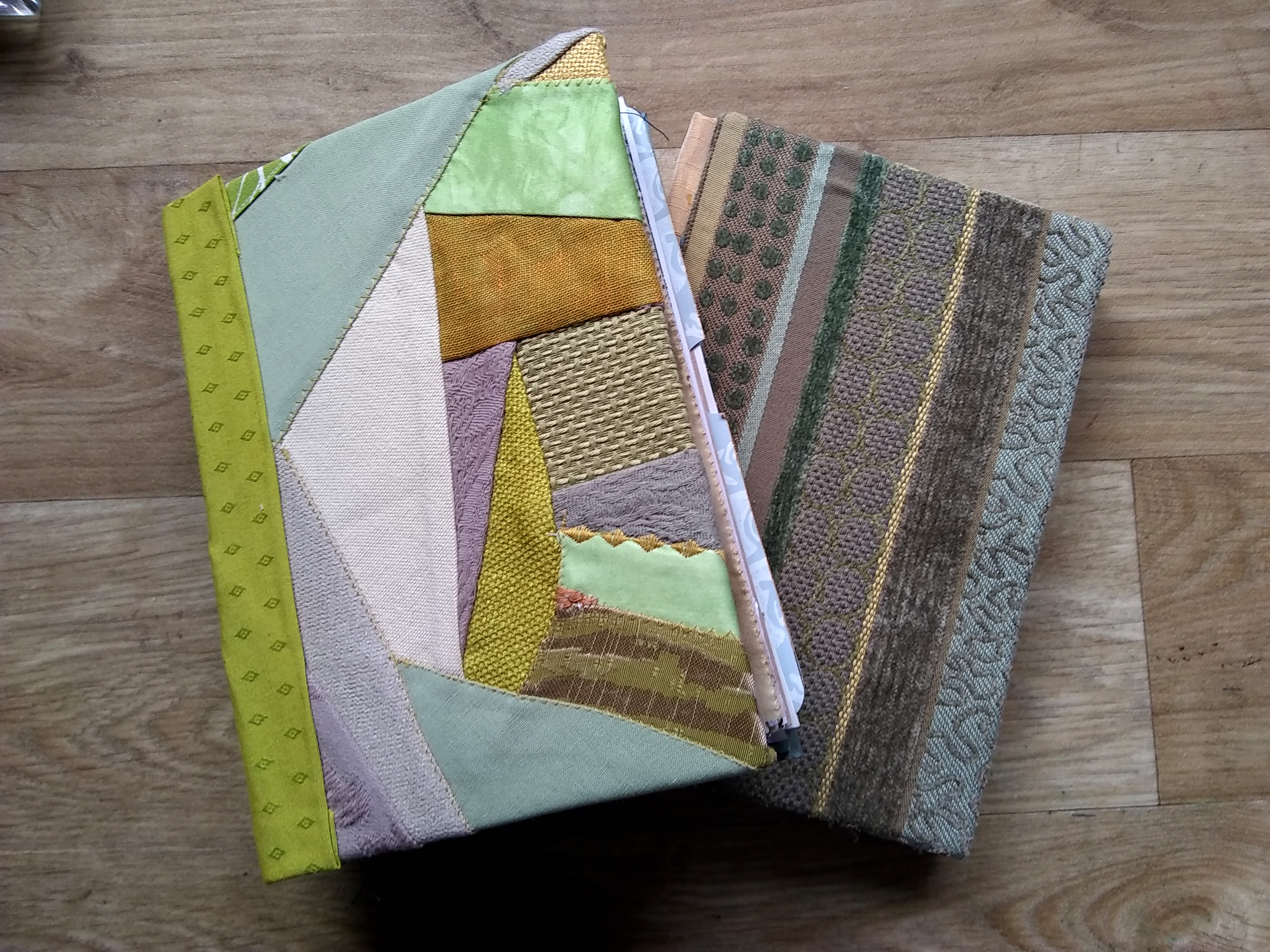
Showing handmade, hardbacked, fabric covered junk journals in A5 size.

The size of junk journals is up to the maker's preference. They typically range from miniature to no more than A4.

== Commercial industry and market ==
The global expansion of junk journaling has fostered a specialized commercial market that overlaps significantly with the broader scrapbooking and papercraft industries. Industrial scale businesses, devoted specifically to the manufacturing and sale of junk journaling supplies have evolved, supplying ready-made aged papers, cardstock, distressing inks, paints and precision pens.

Prominent craft designers, such as, Tim Holtz develop product lines for junk journaling, inspired by everyday objects and materials he encounters in antique malls, flea markets, and collections of old ephemera, reflecting his interest in found and repurposed items.

In addition to mass-produced goods, a micro-economy exists on e-commerce platforms like Etsy where independent creators sell downloadable, themed printed papers. A secondary market also features artists selling fully completed, hand bound junk journals as stand alone art pieces or functional diaries.

Craft and trade fairs are numerous in many countries selling all the requistes available for papercrafting. Author Paula Wilson writes: "By 2026, junk journaling had transitioned from a niche hobby into a mainstream creative industry, with international trade and craft fairs serving as primary venues for practitioners to source specialized tools and materials. Major events such as Creativeworld in Frankfurt and the Paper Craft & Stamping Show in the UK"

== Glossary ==
Stephanie of 'My Porch Prints' writes that "there are some common terms to help you understand the world of junk journaling"

- Altered paperclips: Standard paperclips that are embellished that still serve their original purpose.
- Artist Trading Card (ATCs) miniature collectable handmade artworks, measuring usually 2.5 inches by 3.5 inches(64mm x 89mm).
- Bellybands: A horizontal or vertical strip of paper or fabric adhered to a page at two ends creating a slot to secure loose papers or a piece of ephemera.
- Clusters: a decorative embellishment, they involve layering different materials together.
- Embellishment: Accessories used to decorate a page, include stickers, rub-ons, stamps, applied to enhance the visual design.
- Ephemera: Additional material, such as tickets, postcards, hand-made items, added to the junk journal
- Flip thru: A video demonstration or digital showcase where a creator turns and displays every page of a completed journal.
- Flip up: A folded page element or pocket that hinges open vertically or horizontally to reveal a hidden space.
- Grungy: A stylistic aethetic characterised by heavy distressing, intended to make materials appear aged, weathered and heavily used.
- Inking up: The practice of applying archival or water based ink to the edges of paper and ephemera to simulate a vintage aged appearance.
- Layering: The process of stacking multiple pieces of paper, textiles or elements to build depth and create a textured background.
- Pockets: Decorative slots created by adhering pocket shaped paper to pages to hold ephemera
- Printables: Digitals or printables are a type of paper you can purchase online to download and print on a home printer for use in a journal.
- Signature: A group of pages grouped together and bound into the journal
- Tags: Decorated luggage-style tags made from cardstock or heavy paper, tucked into pockets to add to the visual display of a page or cover.
- Tuck-spots: Created and added to a junk journal for storing pieces of memorabilia.
