= Self-adhesive plastic sheet =

Wide sheet material used for decorative purposes

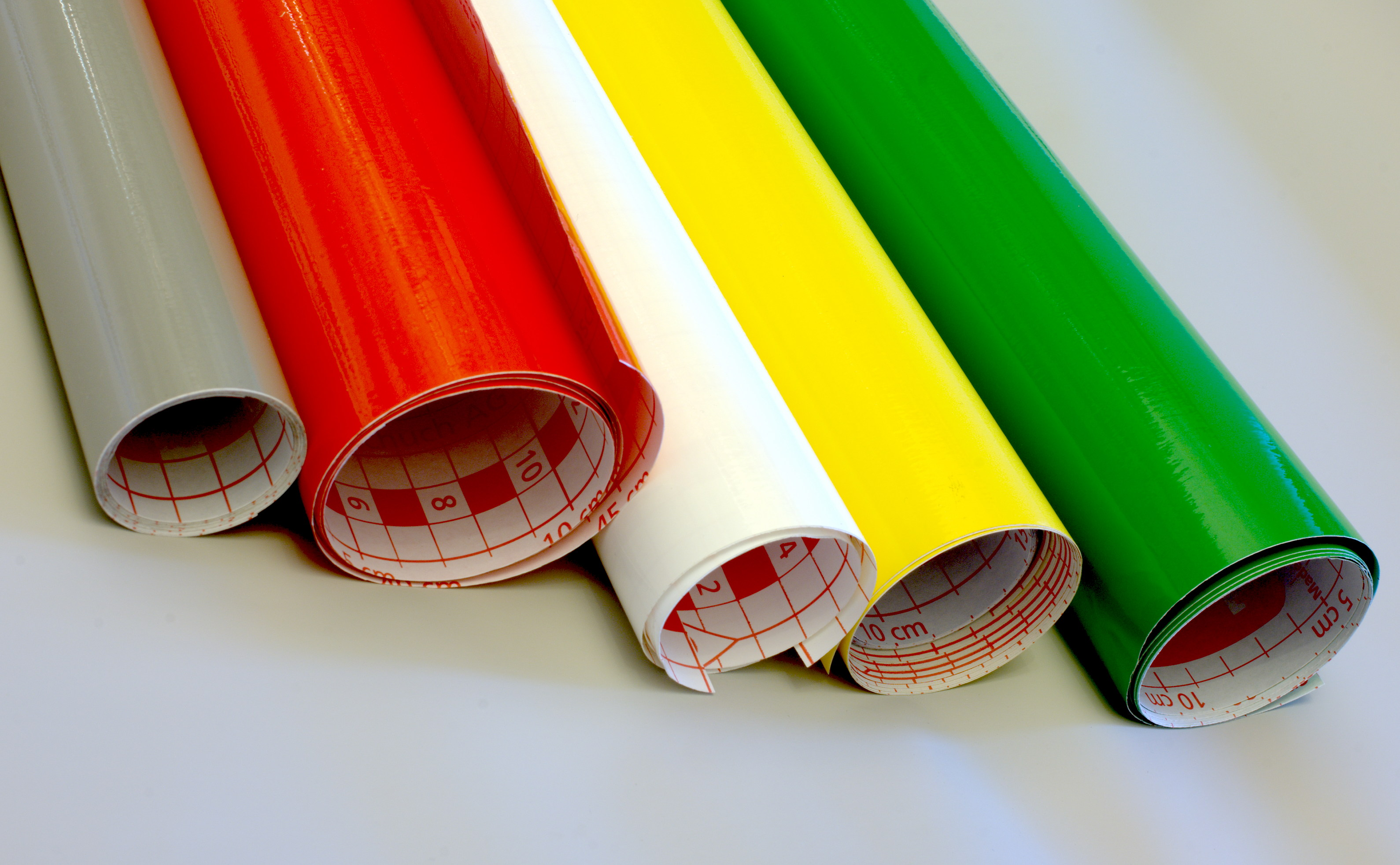

Self-adhesive plastic sheet, known in the United Kingdom as sticky-backed plastic, is wide plastic sheet or film with an adhesive layer on one side, used as a surface coating for decorative purposes. It is typically smooth and shiny, but can also come in textured varieties, in which case it can sometimes be used as a cheap alternative to veneer. The plastic is often PVC. The sheeting is typically sold with a removable paper release liner to prevent it from adhering prematurely.

Self-adhesive vinyl sheet was introduced to the UK market in the 1960s under the brand name Fablon.

It is extensively used in DIY at the time, and notably featured in children's DIY projects on the British TV show Blue Peter, but always under the generic name "sticky-backed plastic."

Smooth self-adhesive plastic sheet is typically used to cover the studio floor for shiny-floor shows, thus giving them their name.

Since the 1980s, the vinyle films are typically cut on a computer-controlled plotter (see vinyl cutter) or printed in a wide-format printer. These sheets and films are used to produce a wide variety of commercial signage products, vinyl wraps or racing stripes on vehicles for aesthetics or as wrap advertising, and general purpose stickers.

Adhesive lettering has largely overtaken painted lettering and developed into a sector that uses around 20,000 tonnes of PVC and glues per year.

== See also ==
- Contact paper
- Vinyl lettering
- Pressure-sensitive tape
