= Brass fastener =

Type of paper fastener

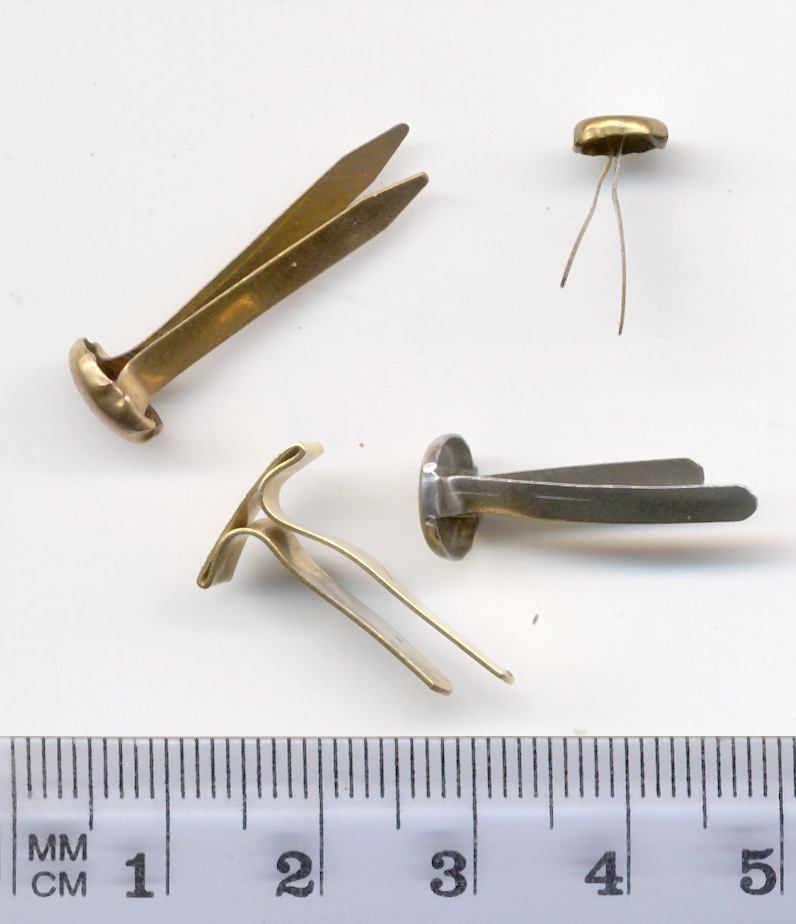
A variety of brass fasteners. Note the two legs of different length.

A brass fastener, butterfly clips, brad, paper fastener or split pin is a stationery item used for securing multiple sheets of paper together. A patent of the fastener was issued in 1866 to George W. McGill. The fastener is inserted into punched holes in the stack of paper, and the leaves, or tines, of the legs are separated and bent over to secure the paper. This holds the pin in place and the sheets of paper together. When used for only a few sheets of paper, holes can be made using the sharp end of the fastener.

A split pin may be used in place of staples, but they are more commonly used in situations where rotation around the joint is desirable. This lends split pins to use in mobile paper and cardboard models, and they are often used as modern scrapbooking embellishments. In the film industry, brass fasteners are an industry standard in binding screenplays.

It is shaped somewhat like a nail with a round head and flat, split length. Brass fasteners are made of a soft metal such as brass and the tines are typically of two slightly different lengths to allow easy separation. A brass fastener is similar in design and function to the mechanical counterpart split pins.
