= Immunization registry =

An immunization registry or immunization information system (IIS) is an information system that collects vaccination data about all persons within a geographic area. It consolidates the immunization records from multiple sources for each person living in its jurisdiction.

== Introduction ==
Immunization information systems (IIS) are an important tool to increase and sustain high vaccination coverage by consolidating vaccination records of children and adults from multiple providers, forecasting next doses past due, due, and next due to support generating reminder and recall vaccination notices for each individual, and providing official vaccination forms and vaccination coverage assessments. One of the national health objectives is to increase to 95% the proportion of children aged <6 years who participate in fully operational population-based IIS.

A "fully operational" IIS includes 95% enrollment or higher of all catchment area children less than 6 years of age with 2 or more immunization encounters administered according to ACIP recommendations.

In a population-based IIS, children are entered into the IIS at birth, often through a linkage with electronic birth records. An IIS record also can be initiated by a health care provider at the time of a child's first immunization. If an IIS includes all children in a given geographical area and all providers are reporting immunization information, it can provide a single data source for all community immunization partners. Such a population-based IIS can make it easier to carry out the demonstrably effective immunization strategies (e.g., reminder/recall, AFIX, and WIC linkages) and thereby decrease the resources needed to achieve and maintain high levels of coverage. IIS can also be used to enhance adult immunization services and coverage. Pharmacy immunizations are reported to state IIS, allowing for a complete lifetime immunization history.

The concept of IIS is not new. Many individual practices and health plans administer immunizations to their patients. Records of these immunizations often are based on computerized information systems designed for other purposes, such as billing. There is also a growing movement toward the development of totally computerized patient medical records. Although an IIS includes all immunizations administered by health care providers participating in it, only population-based IIS are capable of providing information on all children and all adult doses of vaccines administered by all providers.

== See also ==
- Vaccination schedule
