= Heat press =

Machine that imprints a design using heat

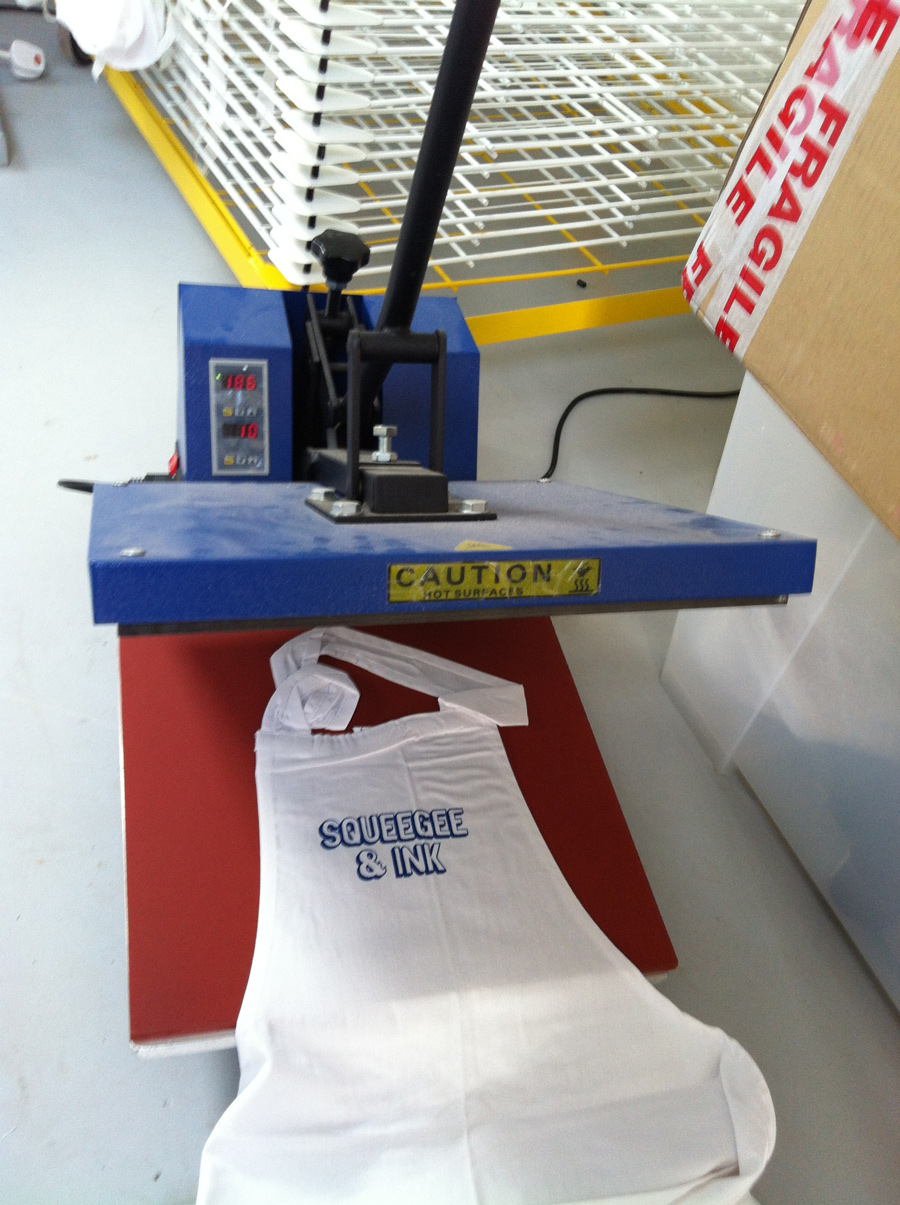
Screen printed fabric on heat press to set the ink.

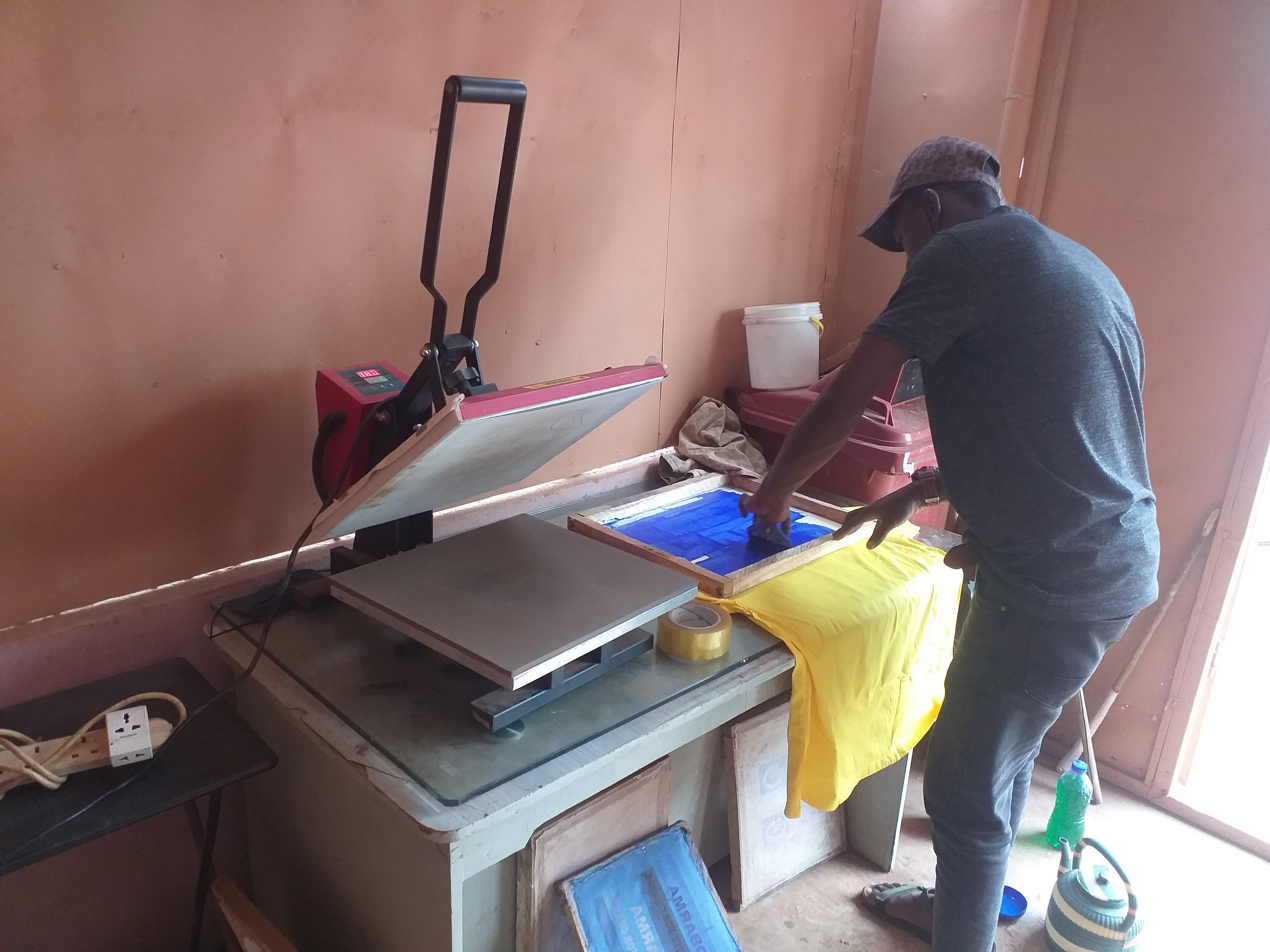
A graphic designer silkscreen printing next to a heat press

A heat press is a machine engineered to imprint a design or graphic on a substrate, such as a t-shirt, with the application of heat and pressure for a preset period of time. While heat presses are often used to apply designs to fabrics, specially designed presses can also be used to imprint designs on mugs, plates, jigsaw puzzles, caps, and other products.

Both manual and automatic heat presses are widely available. A new style of press that is semi-automatic has entered the market as well, allowing for a manual closing process with an automatic, electromagnetic opening. Digital technology in newer machines enables precise control of heat and pressure levels and timing. The most common types of heat press employ a flat platen to apply heat and pressure to the substrate. In the "clamshell" design, the upper heat element in the press opens like a clamshell, while in the "swing-away" design, the heat platen swings away from the lower platen. Another design type a "draw style press" allows for the bottom platen to be pulled out like a drawer away from the heat for preparation of the graphic. Vacuum presses utilize air pressure to provide the necessary force and can achieve high psi ratings.

Most heat presses currently on the market use an aluminium upper-heating element with a heat rod cast into the aluminium or a heating wire attached to the element. For high-volume operations involving the continuous imprinting of items, automatic shuttle and dual platen transfer presses are used. The substrates to be imprinted are continuously loaded onto the lower platen and shuttled under the heat platen, which then applies the necessary heat and pressure.

The pattern is printed in sublimating ink on sublimating paper which allows the pattern to transfer.

== Uses ==
A heat press is used to permanently apply a heat transfer to a surface. Common transfer types are Heat Transfer Vinyl cut with a vinyl cutter, Printable Heat Transfer Vinyl, Inkjet Transfer Paper, Laser Transfer Paper, Plastisol Transfers, and Sublimation. Using a Heat Press to apply a heat transfer is a way to ensure accurate time, temperature, and pressure, which are all essential to the transfer process.
