= Cutting mat =

Mat placed under a workpiece to be cut to protect the underlying surface

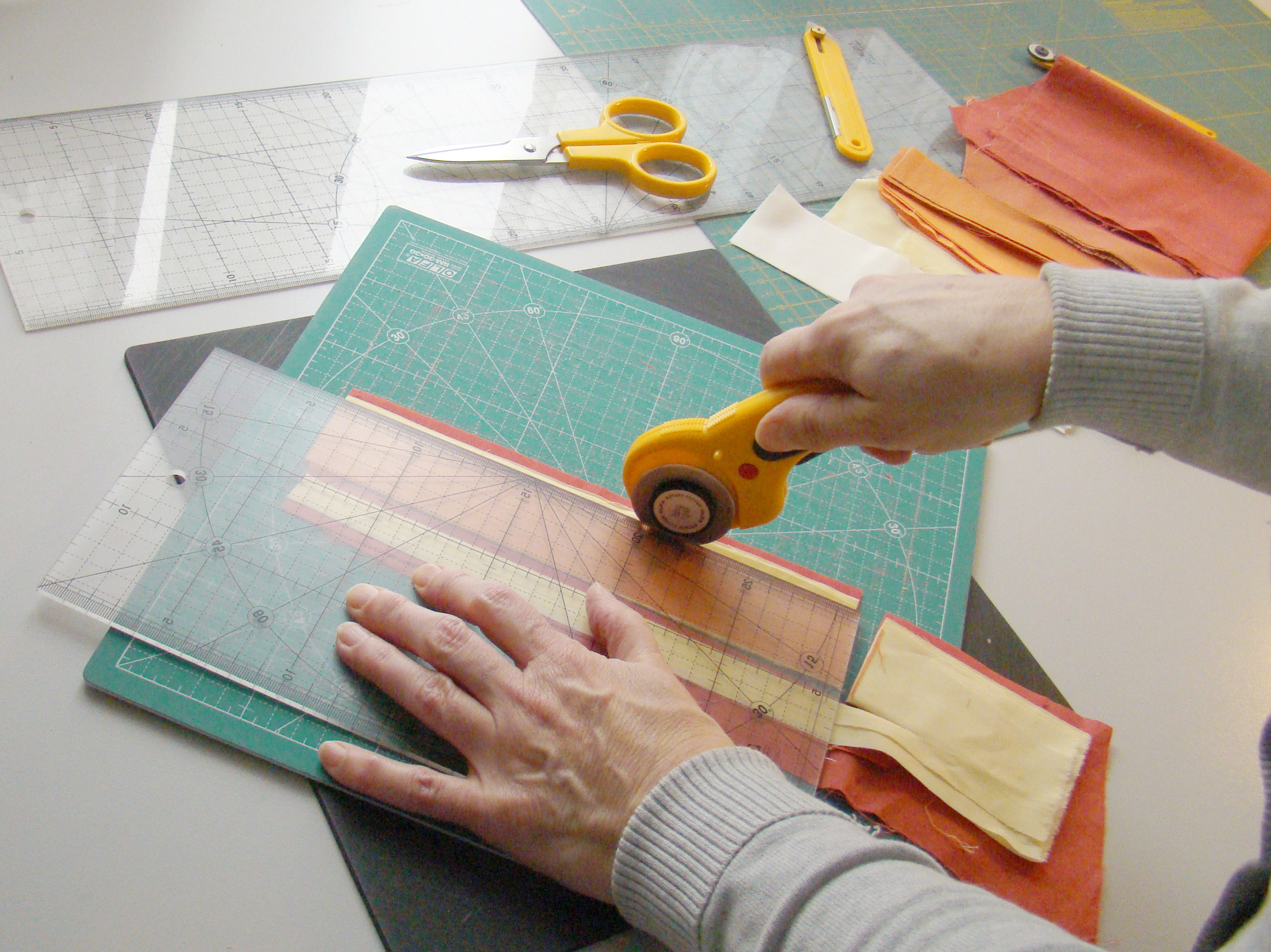
Fabric cutting for patchwork with a cutting wheel on a 300 × 300 mm cutting board (with 10 mm grid)

A cutting mat is a mat that is placed between a workpiece to be cut and the surface below (e.g. a table) to protect the surface. The material is significantly softer than steel blades, thus preserving their sharpness.

They are used, amongst other things, in hobby work for precise and clean cuts of paper, cardboard or textiles using a scalpel or rotary cutter. They often have grids with a line every 5 or 10 millimeter that can be used to position, aim and measure the workpiece.

Examples of uses are textile cutting for patchwork, or paper cutting for art or architecture modeling. They are also used as a substrate in vinyl cutters.

== Materials ==
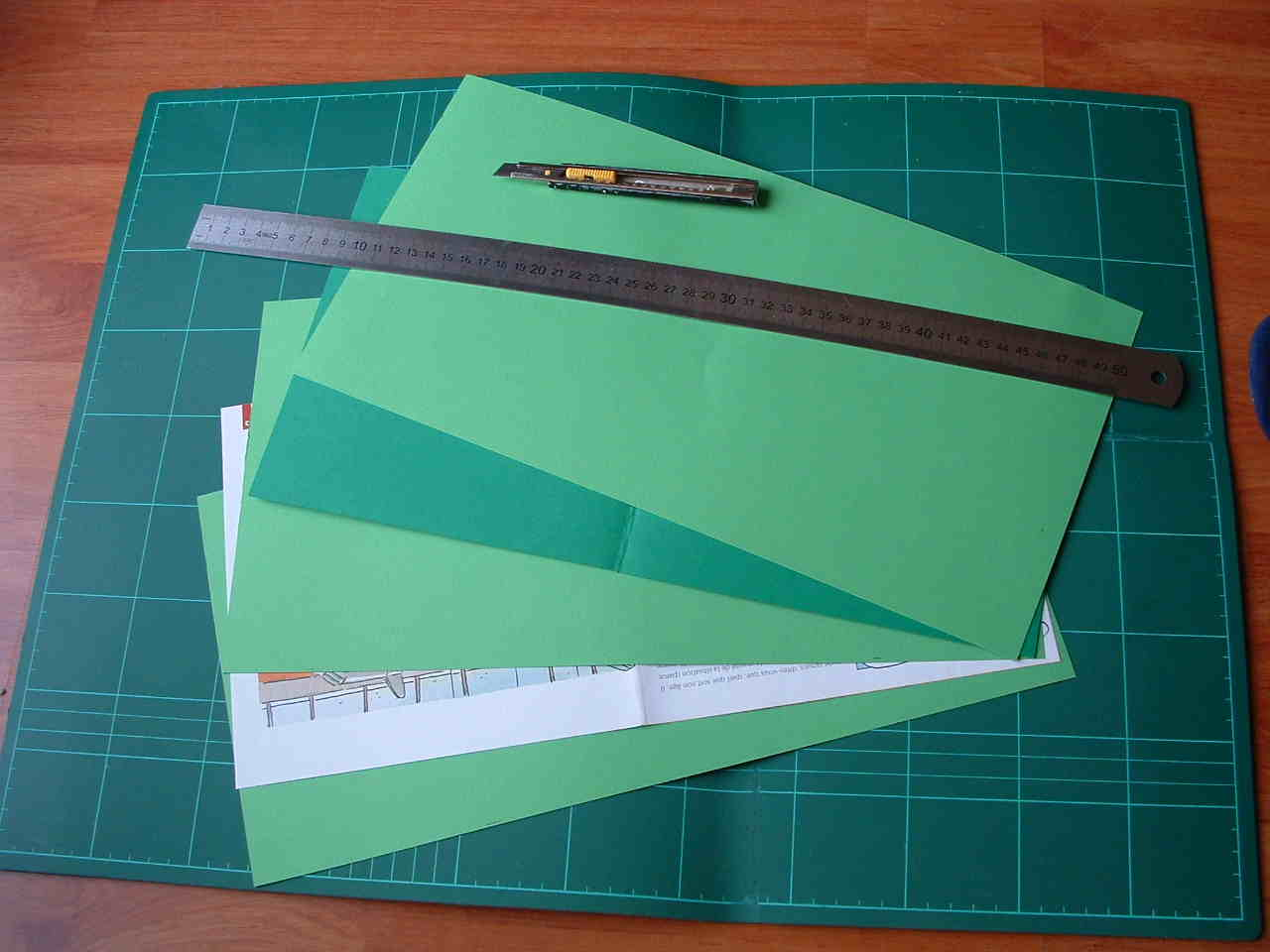
Note that the mat is bent after improper storage (50 mm grid)

Cutting mats are made in various materials. Vinyl chloride (soft or hard plastic) and alkene are the most common materials. Many mats are somewhat soft and bendable, and some are marketed as having "self-healing" properties. Some mats have a magnetic core. There are also mats made of glass.

=== Wear ===
Some cutting mats are marketed as "self-healing", but this claimed functioning is not well documented. Apparently, such cutting mats have the characteristic that stripes from cuts in the mat are not so easily visible. However, this only applies when the cutting blade is moved perpendicular to the surface. Ordinary cuts in the plate itself will therefore often not be very visible in the form of surface irregularities even with repeated use, unless the surface cuts are done in a V shape, which, on the other hand, quickly will leave irregularities that make the mat difficult to use.

Cutting mats are usually not heat resistant.

=== Storage ===
Some mats do not tolerate sunlight well, and should therefore not be stored in direct sunlight. Mats can bend if they are not stored flat, which may result in them not lying evenly during use.

== Size and grids ==
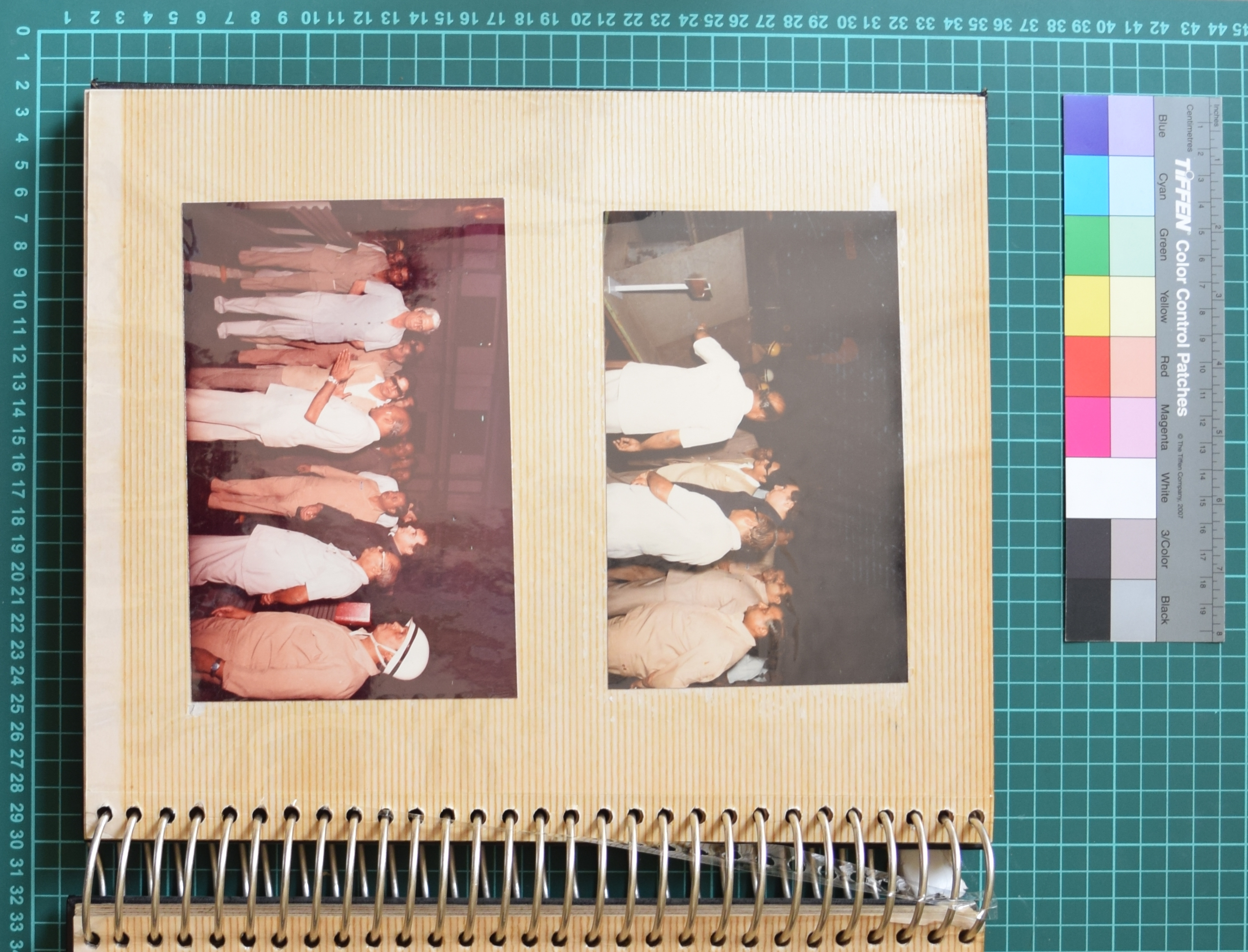
Image of a photo album, where the cutting mat below shows the scale by lines every 10 mm, as well as a color chart being used to document colors

Many cutting mats are plastic sheets in the sizes A4 (297 × 210 mm) or A5 (210 × 148 mm), but there are also larger sheets in A1 (841 × 594 mm, or possibly 900 × 600 mm) or larger.

The thickness is on the order of 3 to 5 mm.

The grid often has divisions with lines every 5 mm or 10 mm.

== Improvised variants ==
For occasional and ad hoc work, one can instead use old newspapers, magazines, cardboard or the like instead of a dedicated cutting mat.

== Other uses ==
Cutting boards with grids are sometimes used for scale when taking pictures.

== See also ==
- Origami
- Cutting board
