= University of British Columbia Library =

Academic library system in British Columbia, Canada

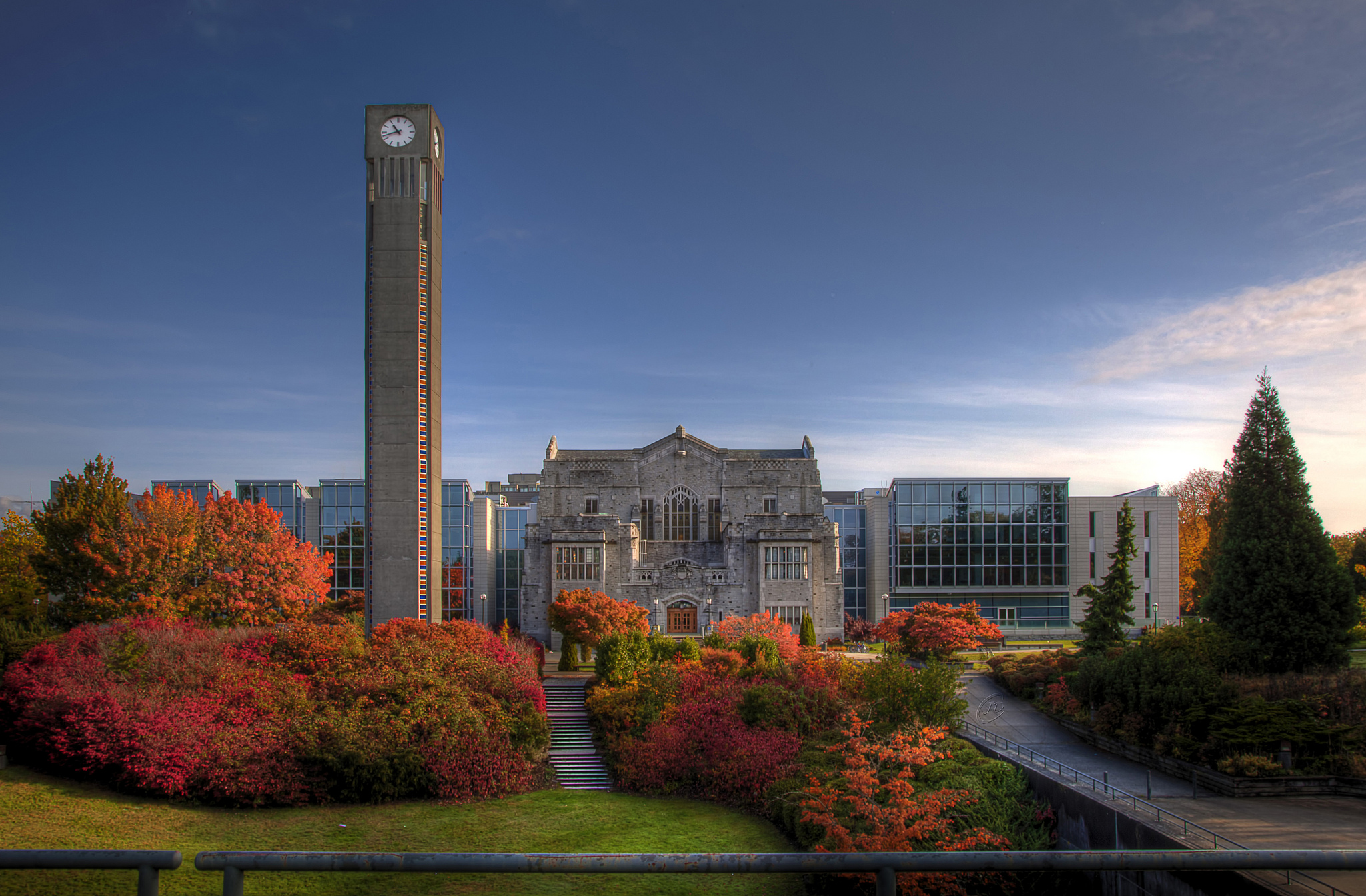
- The Irving K. Barber Learning Centre, built around the Main Library
- 49.2665707°N 123.2535571°W
- Location: British Columbia, Canada
- Type: Academic library system of the University of British Columbia (UBC)
- Established: 1914
- Branches: 12

Collection
- Items collected: more than 15.8 million items, including 5.7 million physical items (including 923,000 maps, videos and other multimedia materials.), 5.3 million microforms, 4.2 million e-books, and 440,000 journal titles.
- Size: 8.3 million (2019)
- Legal deposit: depository library for publications of the governments of British Columbia (BC), Canada, Japan and the United Nations.

Other information
- Budget: CAD 51.8 million (2025, Vancouver Campus), with 41% for collections, 39% for salaries, 11% for other costs, and 9% for benefits. This is a decrease from a CAD 54.6 million budget in 2022.
- Employees: 290 total, including 139 Professional Staff, 129 Support Staff, and 22 student assistants (2021)
- Website: www.library.ubc.ca

The University of British Columbia Library (UBC Library) is the library system of the University of British Columbia (UBC). The library is one of the 124 members of the Association of Research Libraries (ARL). In 2025, UBC Library ranked 32nd among members of the ARL for the number of volumes in library (physical volumes), making it the third largest Canadian academic library after the University of Toronto and the University of Alberta. However, UBC Library ranked 23rd for the titles held (physical and online documents) and second in Canada.

UBC Library is one of the largest research libraries in Canada, with 13 branches and divisions at UBC and at other locations, including branches at Vancouver Hospital and Health Sciences Centre, and one at the UBC Okanagan campus.

As of 2025, UBC Library's collection comprises 8.3 million items, including 4.2 million e-books, 5.3 million microforms, 440,000 journal titles and more than 923,000 maps, videos and other multimedia materials. During the year 2024–2025, the UBC community consisted of 101,949 unique users and in 2019 downloaded 3.4 million ebooks and 7.4 million journal articles, the equivalent of 89 journal article downloads and 41 ebook downloads per person.

UBC Library has one of the largest collection of Asian-language materials in North America and the largest biomedical collection in Western Canada. It is a depository library for publications of the governments of British Columbia (BC), Canada, Japan and the United Nations.

The Library's collections of special and unique materials include the archives of Canadian author and artist Douglas Coupland, the Uno Langmann Family Collection of B.C. Photographs (consisting of more than 18,000 rare and unique early photographs of British Columbia), the H. Colin Slim Stravinsky Collection (the largest collection of its kind in Canada, including more than 130 items documenting the work and life of Igor Stravinsky) and the Wallace B. Chung and Madeline H. Chung Collection, containing more than 25,000 rare and one-of-a-kind items relating to the discovery of BC, the development of the Canadian Pacific Railway, and Chinese immigration to Canada. The collection includes documents, books, maps, posters, paintings, photographs, silver, glass, ceramic ware and other artifacts.

In October 2015, UBC Library opened its newest facility, Library Preservation and Archives (PARC), a new modular storage facility designed to accommodate the future growth of library collections. The building is located at UBC Vancouver's South Campus (in the Research Precinct) and provides 2,280 square metres of high-density collection storage. It can store about 1.6 million volumes and the facility also houses a campus-wide records management service.

== Major branches ==
=== Asian Library ===
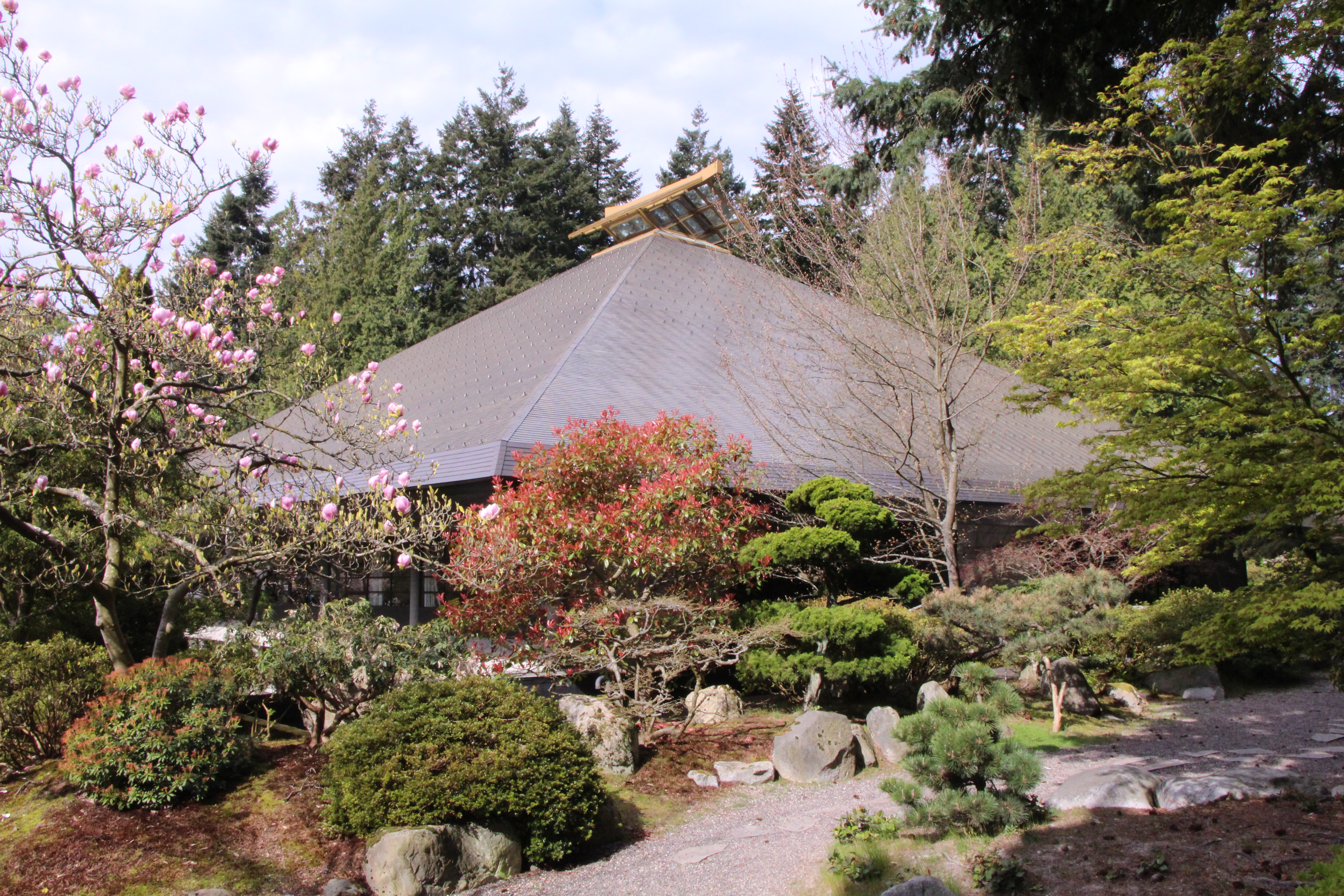
UBC Asian Centre, building for the Asian Library and Asian Studies faculty and staff

Since 1959, the Asian Library, located in the Asian Centre since 1981, houses one of the largest research collection in Asian languages in North America. Its holdings in Chinese, Japanese, Korean, Hindi, Tibetan, Persian, Punjabi, Sanskrit, Urdu and Indonesian exceed 710,000 volumes as of June 2020. As of April 2022, the library includes 203,000 Chinese language books and ebooks, 250,000 Japanese language books and ebooks, 42,000 Hindi language books and ebooks and 38,000 Korean language books and ebooks.

Subject material about Asia in English and other European languages, as well as Asian materials in non-Asian languages, are kept in Koerner Library and other branches. Asia-related law materials are located in the Law Library. Monographs in Tamil, Malayalam, Bengali, Gujarati, Kannada, Marathi, Rajasthani, Assamese, Nepali and Tibetan are shelved in the Irving K. Barber Learning Centre.

Special materials include Japanese government publications, research materials on Chinese Canadian settlement in British Columbia and the Pearl Delta Area as well as Japanese Canadian studies collections. The Asian Library's rare book collection, mainly from the Puban collection, ranks first in North America. The Chinese collection ranked third in North America in number of volumes at the time of publication of Endymion Wilkinson's Chinese History: A Manual in 2000.

The architecture of the Asian Centre building, in which the Asian Library is located, is based on a traditional pagoda, and the building was designed by Donald Matsuba at the cost of $1.6 million Canadian dollars. The building was intended to be a centennial gift funded by the Government of Japan, serving as a symbol of Asian-Canadian and Canada–Japan relations. The Asian studies idea was created by Geoffrey Brian Hainsworth and a few of his colleagues.

=== Irving K. Barber Learning Centre/Main Library ===
UBC's Main Library underwent major renovations beginning in 2002. In phase one, the north wing was demolished and rebuilt. It now houses the bookstacks of the facility. Once the renovated north wing opened, the old south wing and "heritage core" of the Main Library was closed, with the south wing being demolished and the heritage core stripped to the original frame and exterior from 1925. The South Wing was officially opened to the public on February 25, 2008, with the heritage core opening in late March 2008. The building is now known as the Irving K. Barber Learning Centre, named in honour of donor Irving K. Barber.

Notable features include the first Automated Storage and Retrieval System (ASRS) in Canada, referred to as the "library robot." The system increases the amount of storage space available, but has been criticized for preventing browsing.

The Irving K. Barber Learning Centre houses the Rare Books and Special Collections (RBSC) and University Archives divisions (level one) and the Music, Art and Architecture Library (levels three and four). The Chung Collection, a designated national treasure, is located in the RBSC space, and focuses on the Canadian Pacific Railway, the Asian experience in Canada, and West Coast history and exploration. The Learning Centre is also home to the Chapman Learning Commons on level three, located in the restored historic core of the old Main Library.

Artwork on display around the Learning Centre includes pieces from noted artists such as John Nutter, Kevin DuBois and First Nations artist Brent Sparrow. The Institute for stained glass in Canada has documented the stained glass at the UBC Main Library.

=== Okanagan Libraries ===
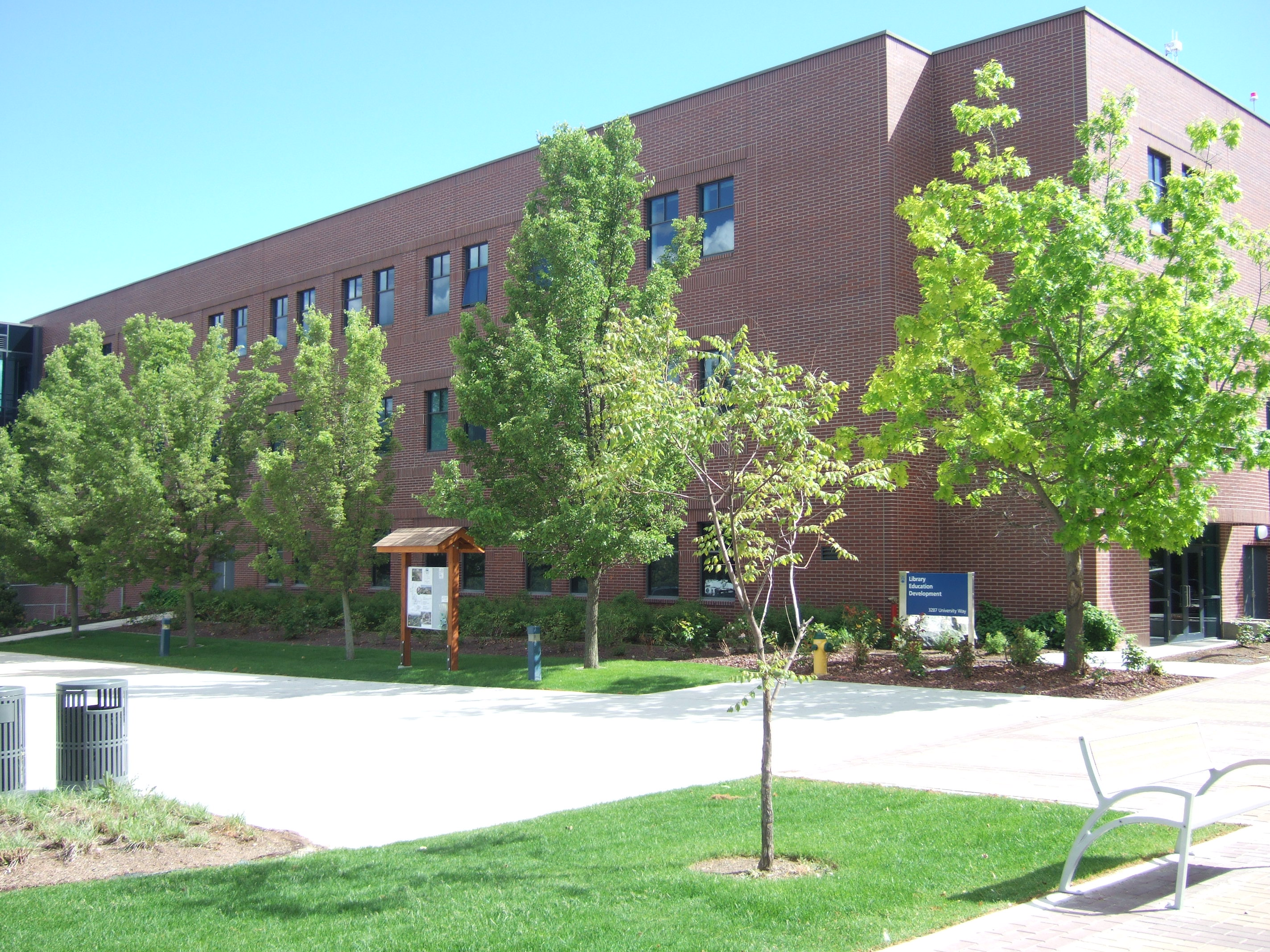
Okanagan Library Building at UBC's Okanagan campus

UBC Library also serves the university's Okanagan campus in Kelowna. Two library buildings on campus are interconnected with the southern "Library" building containing the Okanagan Library with open collections and access to Okanagan Regional Library, while the northern "The Commons" building containing media labs, special collections and archives.

In 2014–15, the Okanagan campus Library had 688,000 library visits and answered more than 17,000 in-person inquiries at their Library Service Desk.

The Okanagan Library assumed responsibility for campus writing services in 2014, and launched a new Writing & Research Services unit. 2014 also marked the launch of UBC Okanagan's special collections program, with collections relating to the history, literature and culture of the Okanagan Valley.

In 2014, UBC Okanagan's students voted in a referendum to contribute up to $10 million toward the expansion of the campus’ Library and Learning Centre. The renovations will add 45,000 square feet of space, more than doubling the size of the existing library.

In Fall 2015, the Innovation Library - a collaboration between the UBC Okanagan Library and the Okanagan Regional Library - opened to support the Okanagan campus' students, faculty, and staff, as well as community researchers in the Okanagan. The Innovation Library is located downtown in the Okanagan Regional Library's Kelowna Branch.

In 2017, UBC Okanagan partnered with numerous local museums and archives throughout the Okanagan region to initiate the Digitized Okanagan History project. The project digitizes historical photographs and records related to the history of B.C.'s Southern Interior, and provides access to them online.

=== Walter C. Koerner Library ===
Koerner Library, designed by Arthur Erickson, was built in 1997, replacing Sedgewick Library. Koerner houses humanities and social sciences, government publications, journals and microforms, and numeric data files, the Map & Atlas Collection, and the UBC Research Commons. It is home to nearly 1.3 million items. Its postmodern architecture contrasts with the Gothic Revival design of the original Main Library (now the Irving K. Barber Learning Centre) on the other side of Main Mall. Koerner is also home to the university's Interlibrary loan program.

=== Woodward Library ===
The Woodward Library's collection covers a broad range of disciplines in support of learning and research in the Faculties of Applied Science, Dentistry, Forestry, Land & Food Systems, Medicine, Pharmaceutical Sciences and Science. The collection covers a range of subject areas, including agriculture, animal welfare, biology, botany, chemistry, computer science, dentistry, earth and ocean sciences, engineering, food science, forestry, mathematics, medicine, nursing, nutrition, pharmacy, physics, public health, statistics, wood science and zoology. Woodward Library has the largest biomedical collection in Western Canada and a strong history of medicine and science collection.

=== X̱wi7x̱wa Library ===
X̱wi7x̱wa (pronounced whei-wha) Library is one of the only Aboriginal branches of a university library in Canada. Located adjacent to the First Nations Longhouse, it houses a collection of 12,000 items, including to 6,000 books and 450 videos relating to First Nations in British Columbia, and resources on Indigenous peoples from across Canada and internationally. The name comes from the Squamish Nation word meaning "echo." The name was gifted by Chief Simon Baker of the Squamish Nation. Established in May 1993, the X̱wi7x̱wa Library became a branch of the UBC Library in 2005. The library is the result of a 1984 Stauffer Foundation Grant to the Native Indian Teacher Education Program (NITEP) that provided funds to build the collection. This collection was then gifted to the X̱wi7x̱wa Library when opening in 1993. The library also received a $1 million gift by William and June Bellman the same year. The classification used by the library reflects efforts to decolonize the current library classification systems. The library uses a British Columbia variant of the Xwi7xwa classification system, developed by Kahnawake librarian, Brian Deer, for the National Indian Brotherhood in the 1970s.

== Other branches and units ==
- The Biomedical Branch Library is located at Vancouver Hospital and Health Sciences Centre.
- The David Lam Management Research Library houses materials relating to commerce and business administration, and the Canaccord Learning Commons.
- The Education Library houses curriculum materials and other education materials, including children's books. (Closed as of June 6, 2025).
- The Innovation Library a collaboration between UBC Okanagan Library and the Okanagan Regional Library (ORL) and located at ORL's Kelowna branch.
- The Law Library houses law-related materials, and is located in the Allard Hall, the new UBC Faculty of Law building.
- The University Archives is the official repository of the university's corporate records and information
- The Digitization Centre preserves, collects, organizes, disseminates and provides access to the Library's collections
- cIRcle is the university's digital open access institutional repository for research and teaching materials created by the UBC community
- The Library Preservation and Archives (PARC), is a storage facility for low-circulation items

There are also several theological libraries associated with Regent College and the Vancouver School of Theology. The John Richard Allison Library at Regent College houses 185,000 items, including 140,000 print books, with a strong representation of biblical studies, pastoral studies, and Protestant intellectual thought.

== Partnerships and collaboration ==
The Library is a member of the Canadian Association of Research Libraries and the Association of Research Libraries; CRKN / RCDR; the International Federation of Library Associations and Institutions; the Council of Prairie and Pacific University Libraries; the Center for Research Libraries; the Council of Post-Secondary Library Directors, British Columbia; the BC Electronic Library Network; and SPARC.
