= List of tallest buildings in Kelowna =

Skyline of Kelowna
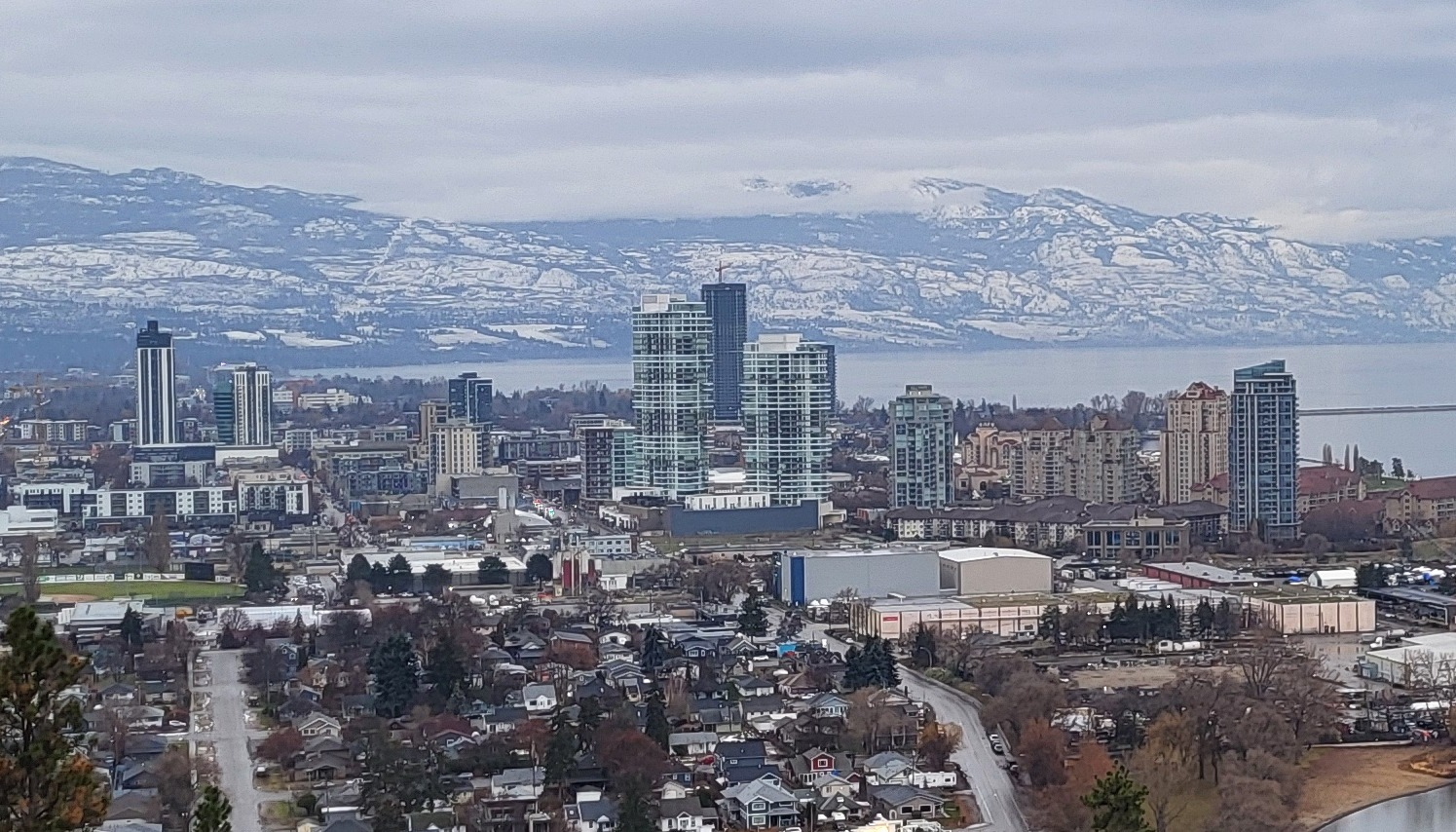
- Kelowna viewed from Knox Mountain Park in 2024
- Tallest building: The Eli at Water Street by the Park (2025)
- Tallest building height: 137.8 m (452 ft)

Number of tall buildings (2026)
- Taller than 50 m (164 ft): 21
- Taller than 75 m (246 ft): 8
- Taller than 100 m (328 ft): 3

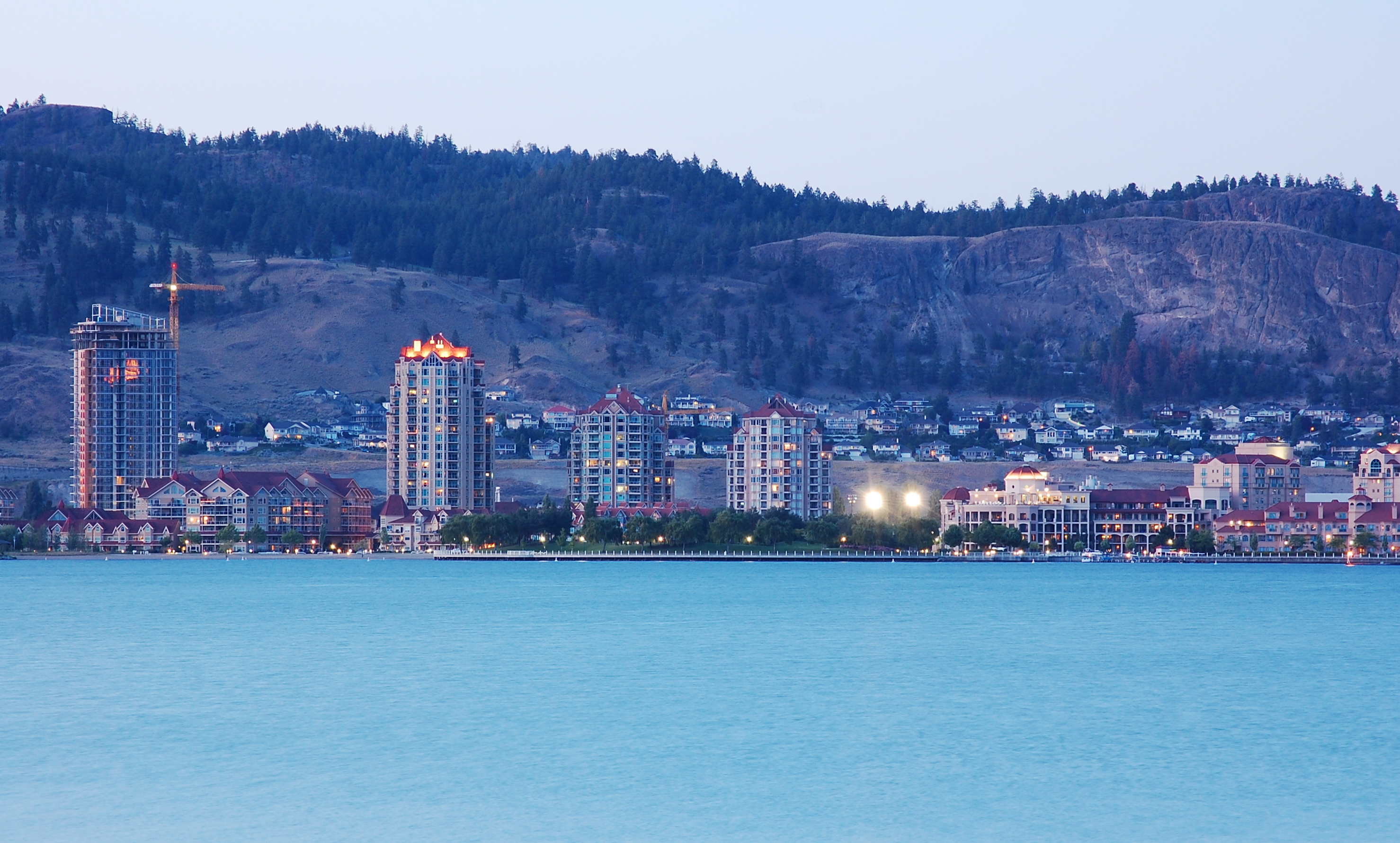
Kelowna's skyline in 2009, seen on Okanagan Lake, is noticeably smaller than today.

Kelowna is the largest city in the Okanagan Valley region of the Canadian province of British Columbia, with a metropolitan area population of around 250,000 as of 2025. Kelowna has some of the tallest buildings of any metropolitan area of its size in North America. The city contains many of the tallest buildings in British Columbia outside of Greater Vancouver. As of 2026, Kelowna has 21 buildings taller than 50 m (164 ft), three of which exceed 100 m (328 ft) in height. The tallest building in Kelowna is The Eli at Water Street by the Park, a 137.8 m (452 ft), 42-storey residential tower completed in 2025.

The first high-rise in Kelowna is considered to be the 12-storey Kiwanis Tower (now Legacy Tower), constructed in 1976. Between 1994 and 2005, a trio of condominium towers—The Dolphins, The Lagoons, and Sunset Waterfront Resort—were built on Kelowna's waterfront on Okanagan Lake, each successively becoming the city's tallest building upon completion. They were followed by Skye at Waterscapes in 2010, which rose to 83 m (273 ft).

Since the late 2010s, Kelowna has been undergoing a significant high-rise boom, driven by the city's healthy population growth, limited land availability, and support for infill development. All five of Kelowna's tallest buildings were completed after 2020, transforming its downtown skyline. UBCO Tower, a skyscraper under construction to house the downtown campus of University of British Columbia Okanagan, will reach a height of 155 m (510 ft) upon its completion in 2027.

Most of Kelowna's tallest buildings are located in the city centre, including Downtown Kelowna and the neighbourhood of North End to its north. This area is on the eastern shore of Okanagan Lake, and north of British Columbia Highway 97. Landmark, a business district east of downtown, is home to several office towers, including Landmark Centre VI and VII. Both of them are among Kelowna's ten tallest buildings.

== History ==
Number of buildings by height in Kelowna by the end of each year, based on the information in this article. Click on the legend to toggle a specific height on or off. View chart definition.

== Map of tallest buildings ==
The map below shows the location of buildings taller than 50 m (164 ft) in Kelowna. Each marker is numbered by the building's height rank, and coloured by the decade of its completion. There are two buildings taller than 50 m (164 ft) located outside of the map: Aqua I and SOPA Square.

Buildings taller than 50 m (164 ft) in Kelowna. An asterisk (*) next to the building's name indicates it is located outside the map.
- 1990s
- 2000s
- 2010s
- 2020s
1 The Eli at Water Street by the Park
2 ONE Water Street East
3 Bertram at Bernard Block
4 ONE Water Street West
5 Landmark Centre VII
6 Skye at Waterscapes
7 Landmark Centre VI
8 Water Street by the Park II
9 Brooklyn at Bernard Block
10 Sunset Waterfront Resort
11 1151 Sunset
12 ELLA
13 Centuria Urban Village
14 Park Place
15 The Lagoons
16 The Madison
17 The Dolphins
18 The Block at Bernard Block
19 Ellis Parc
20 Aqua I*
21 SOPA Square*

== Tallest buildings ==
This list ranks completed buildings in Kelowna that stand at least 50 m (164 ft) tall as of 2026, based on standard height measurement. This includes spires and architectural details but does not include antenna masts. The “Year” column indicates the year of completion. Buildings tied in height are sorted by year of completion with earlier buildings ranked first, and then alphabetically.

Was the tallest building in Kelowna upon completion

Rank	Name	Image	Location	Height m (ft)	Floors	Year	Purpose	Notes
1	The Eli at Water Street by the Park		49°53′05″N 119°29′50″W	137.8 (452)	42	2025	Residential	Tallest building in British Columbia outside of Greater Vancouver. Also known as Water Street by The Park Tower B. Part of the Water Street by the Park development.
2	ONE Water Street East		49°53′39″N 119°29′39″W	116.2 (381)	36	2021	Residential	Tallest building in Kelowna from 2021 to 2025. Part of the One Water Street development. Also known as One Water Street I. First building in Kelowna to exceed 100 m (328 ft) in height.
3	Bertram at Bernard Block		49°53′12″N 119°29′26″W	104.1 (342)	34	2024	Residential	Part of the Bernard Block development.
4	ONE Water Street West		49°53′40″N 119°29′42″W	92.2 (302)	29	2022	Residential	Also known as One Water Street II. Part of the One Water Street development.
5	Landmark Centre VII		49°52′51″N 119°27′36″W	90.9 (298)	23	2022	Office	Tallest office building in Kelowna. The tallest office building between Metro Vancouver and Calgary.
6	Skye at Waterscapes		49°53′47″N 119°29′51″W	83.2 (273)	26	2010	Residential	Tallest building in Kelowna from 2010 to 2021. Tallest building completed in Kelowna in the 2010s.
7	Landmark Centre VI		49°52′49″N 119°27′41″W	81 (266)	17	2013	Office	Also known as Landmark VI.
8	Water Street by the Park II		49°53′05″N 119°29′53″W	80 (260)	28	2025	Residential	Also known as Water Street on the Park Tower A. Part of the Water Street by the Park development.
9	Brooklyn at Bernard Block		49°53′13″N 119°29′29″W	74.9 (246)	26	2021	Residential	Part of the Bernard Block development.
10	Sunset Waterfront Resort		49°53′41″N 119°29′52″W	71.3 (234)	21	2005	Residential	Tallest building in Kelowna from 2005 to 2010. Tallest building completed in Kelowna in the 2000s.
11	1151 Sunset		49°53′42″N 119°29′44″W	69.8 (229)	21	2019	Residential	
12	ELLA		49°53′08″N 119°29′38″W	66.2 (217)	19	2021	Mixed-use	
13	Centuria Urban Village	–	49°53′12″N 119°28′33″W	57.9 (190)	16	2008	Residential	
14	Park Place	–	49°52′44″N 119°26′04″W	57 (187)	16	2005	Residential	
15	The Lagoons		49°53′40″N 119°29′50″W	54.3 (178)	16	2000	Residential	Tallest building in Kelowna from 2000 to 2005.
16	The Madison	–	49°53′22″N 119°29′35″W	52.4 (172)	15	2010	Residential	
17	The Dolphins		49°53′38″N 119°29′49″W	51.8 (170)	16	1994	Residential	Tallest building in Kelowna from 1994 to 2000. First building in Kelowna to exceed 50 m (164 ft) in height. Tallest building completed in Kelowna in the 1990s.
18	The Block at Bernard Block		49°53′12″N 119°29′29″W	51.5 (169)	16	2024	Office	
19	Ellis Parc		49°53′36″N 119°29′38″W	51.2 (168)	14	2020	Residential	
20	Aqua I	–	49°50′39″N 119°29′24″W	50 (165) (Note: Sources do not state the exact height of this building. This figure was determined using Google Earth by subtracting the altitude of the building's lowest main pedestrian open-air entrance from its highest architectural point.)	15	2024	Residential	
21	SOPA Square	–	49°51′49″N 119°29′31″W	50 (164)	15	2019	Residential	

== Tallest under construction or proposed ==
=== Under construction ===
The following table includes buildings under construction in Kelowna that are planned to be at least 50 m (164 ft) tall as of 2026, based on standard height measurement. The “Year” column indicates the expected year of completion. Buildings that are on hold are not included.

Name	Height m (ft)	Floors	Year	Purpose	Notes
UBCO Tower	155.3 (510)	46	2027	Mixed-use	Planned downtown campus for the University of British Columbia Okanagan. Residential and educational building. Will become the tallest building in Kelowna upon completion.
1333 Bertram	–	19	2027	Residential	
The Ledge On Lakeshore	–	17	2026	Residential	
Aqua 2	–	17	2026	Residential	

=== Proposed ===
The following table includes approved and proposed buildings in Kelowna that are expected to be at least 50 m (164 ft), based on standard height measurement.

Name	Height m (ft)	Floors	Status	Notes
1355 St Paul - Tower 1	122.8 (403)	40	Approved	
Waterscapes Phase 2 - Tower 1	115 (377)	36	Approved	
Waterscapes Phase 2 - Tower 2	109.5 (359)	34	Approved	
346 Lawrence / 1551 Water	109 (358)	34	Proposed	
Waterscapes Phase 2 - Tower 3	104 (341)	32	Approved	
Gateway Tower	102 (335)	32	Proposed	
Waterscapes Phase 2 - Tower 4	92 (302)	28	Approved	
Water Street by the Park III	80 (262)	24	Approved	
Bertram BC Housing	63 (207)	20	Approved	
1428 St. Paul	58.3 (191)	18	Proposed	
Elta	56 (184)	19	Proposed	

== Timeline of tallest buildings ==
Name	Image	Years as tallest	Height m (ft)	Floors	Reference
Legacy Tower	–	1976–1994	39.6 (130)	13	
The Dolphins		1994–2000	51.8 (170)	16	
The Lagoons		2000–2005	54.3 (178)	16	
Sunset Waterfront Resort		2005–2010	71.3 (234)	21	
Skye at Waterscapes		2010–2021	83.2 (273)	26	
ONE Water Street East		2021–2025	116.2 (381)	36	
The Eli at Water Street by the Park		2025–present	137.8 (452)	42	

== See also ==
- List of tallest buildings in Canada
- List of tallest buildings in British Columbia
- List of tallest buildings in Calgary
