= ORL =

ORL is the abbreviation for a subspecialty within medicine:

- Otorhinolaryngology or otolaryngology – head and neck, or ear, nose, and throat medicine
  - ORL (journal), a journal of otorhinolaryngology published by Karger

ORL may also refer to:

- Oil Refineries Ltd
- Okanagan Regional Library, a library system in British Columbia, Canada
- Old Red Lion, Islington, a pub theatre in London, England
- Oldham and Rochdale Line, a tram line of the Manchester Metrolink
- Olivetti Research Laboratory
- Omar Rodríguez-López, filmmaker, musician, leader of The Mars Volta
- Ontario Rugby League, a rugby league football association in Ontario, Canada
- Optical return loss in fiber optics and telecommunications
- Orlando, Florida, the U.S. city, is commonly abbreviated as ORL
  - Orlando Executive Airport's IATA airport code
  - Orlando Magic, the city's National Basketball Association team
