= Building Academic Retention Through K9s =

Therapy dog organization at University of British Columbia Okanagan

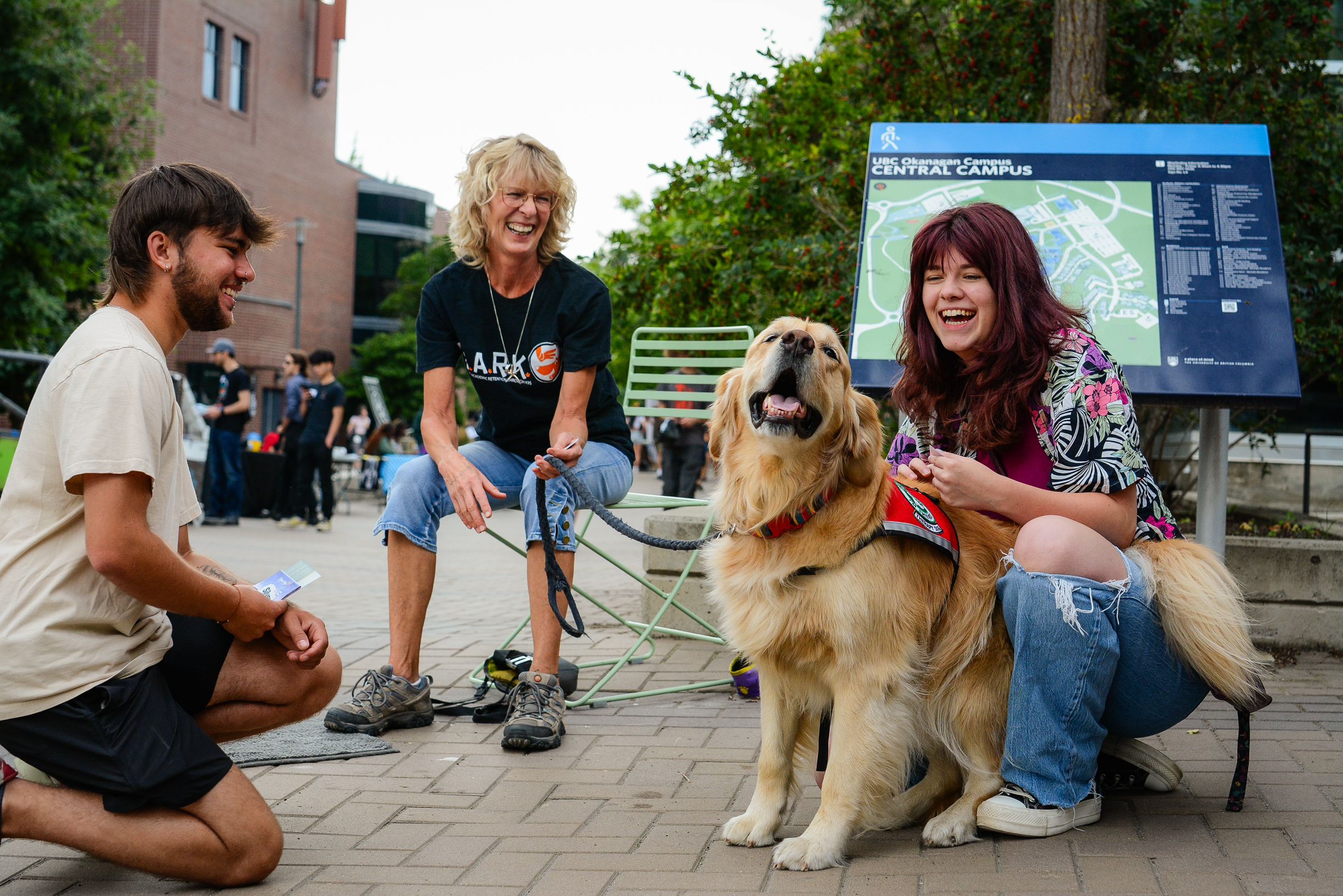
B.A.R.K. Therapy dog Mac welcomes new students to UBC Okanagan.

Founded in 2012, the Building Academic Retention Through K9s (B.A.R.K) program operates out of the University of British Columbia Okanagan (UBCO). The program brings therapy dogs to the UBCO campus with a goal of reducing student stress, homesickness, and loneliness by improving overall wellbeing of students, staff, and faculty on campus. According to Dr. John-Tyler Binfet, the director of the program, "Having a therapy dog program on a college or university campus helps create a sense of community for students and provides a low-barrier and low-cost way for students to take care of themselves". The program has over four thousand visitors per year.

== Background ==
Dr. John-Tyler Binfet, Professor at UBCO, founded the B.A.R.K program in 2012 with the support of Dr. Ian Cull, UBCO's former Associate Vice-President of Students. Dr. Binfet was inspired to begin this initiative after an experience he had on UBCO's campus saying "Upon my arrival to UBC, I would walk across campus with my dog Frances and would be besieged by students. Students would immediately begin interacting with Frances and would eventually look up and with tear-filled eyes say 'As much as I miss my parents, I miss my dog more'. It was at that moment that the idea to offer a canine-assisted visitation program was born." The program now has over 70 dog and handler volunteers and is run by Dr. Binfet along with university student volunteers.

== Programs ==
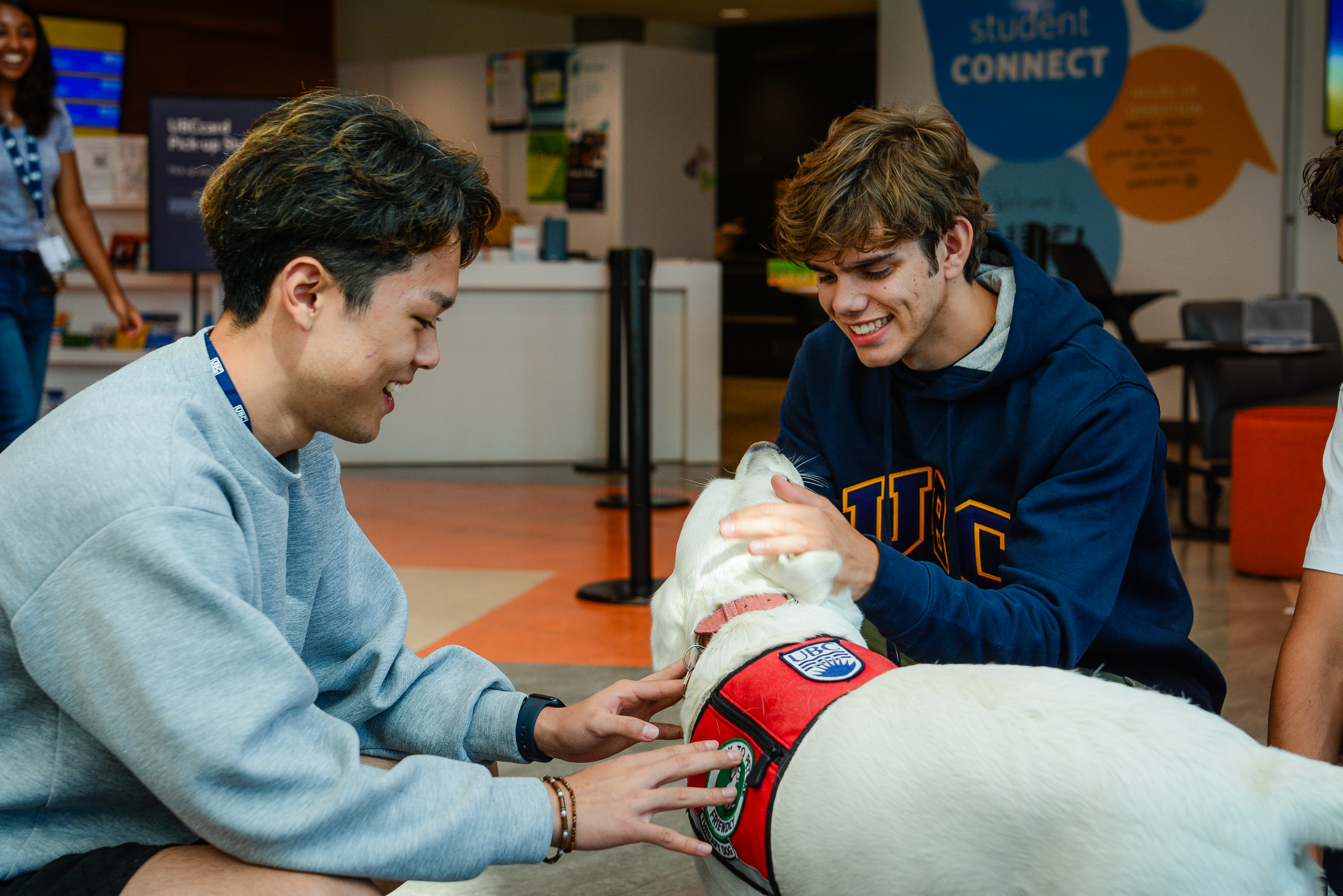
Students spend time with therapy dog Cali at B.A.R.K.2Go

Noticing an increased demand for B.A.R.K. programming throughout the semester, UBCO students Charlie Drummond and Christy Hui pitched a new program idea at Pitch This in 2015. Between the students innovation and funding from Pitch This, B.A.R.K.2Go was launched. B.A.R.K.2Go involves smaller therapy dog stations set up at four locations across the UBCO campus on Wednesday afternoons and is designed to provide easy-access and low-barrier support to students during their regular day-to-day activities on campus.

In 2018, B.A.R.K. held a pilot program to study the impact of therapy dogs and stress reduction in law enforcement officers and staff. Following the pilot program, an ongoing partnership with the Royal Canadian Mounted Police, the City of Kelowna and B.A.R.K. was established. This program has since expanded and now a team of 5-8 dogs attend bi-weekly to provide opportunities for stress reduction and community building within the detachment setting.

== Bibliography ==
- Optimizing Therapy Dog-Handler Team Welfare: A Guide for Researchers and Practitioners
- Virtual Human-Animal Interactions: Supporting Learning, Social Connections, and Well-being
- Canine-Assisted Interventions: A Comprehensive Guide to Credentialing Therapy Dog Teams
- B.A.R.K. Program: Supporting College Students at UBC (Chapter in Handbook of Animal-Assisted Therapy by A. H. Fine)
- Canine-Assisted Interventions: Insights from the B.A.R.K Program and Future Research Directions (Chapter in Canine Cognition and the Human Bond by J.R. Stevens)
