= Irving K. Barber Learning Centre =

Building at the University of British Columbia Vancouver

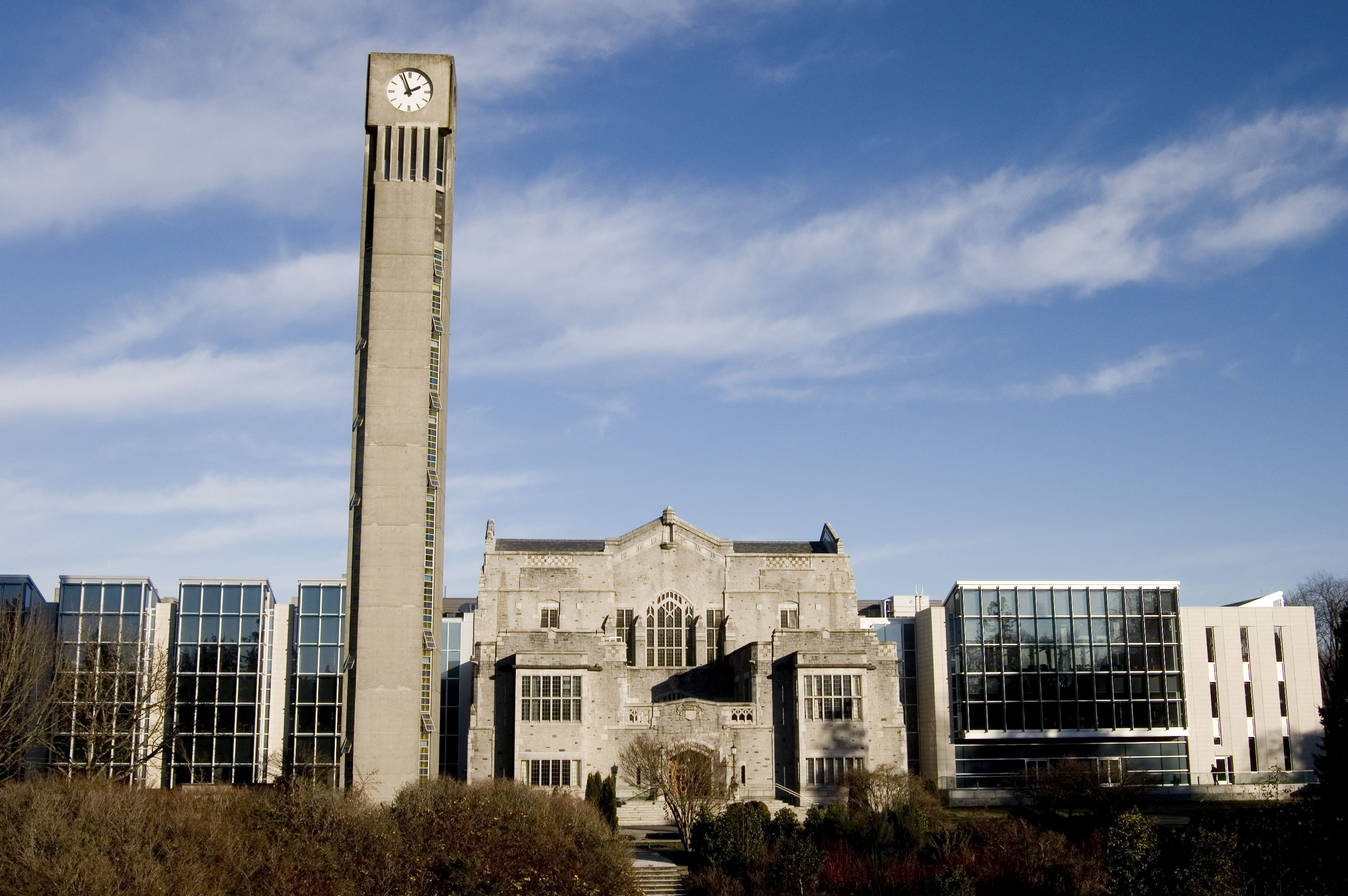
- 49.2674°N 123.2528°W
- Location: 1961 East Mall, Vancouver, British Columbia, Canada
- Type: Academic library
- Branch of: University of British Columbia Library

Other information
- Website: ikblc.ubc.ca

The Irving K. Barber Learning Centre (IKBLC), commonly referred to Irving or IKB, is a four-storey facility at the Vancouver campus of the University of British Columbia. The learning centre is built around the refurbished core of the 1925 UBC Main Library. The Centre is named for Irving. K. Barber, a philanthropist and graduate of UBC.

== Programs and services ==
The IKBLC provides library systems, education centre, library and a conduit of knowledge for lifelong learners and space for UBC Library's print collection and collections of rare and special materials.

=== BC History Digitization Program ===
Started in 2006, the goal of the digitization program is to promote access to British Columbia's historical resources, with free online access to provincial historical materials.

=== Indigitization ===
The Indigitization program supports Indigenous communities and organizations in British Columbia to digitize their cultural heritage materials by providing grant funding and digitization training. The program is unique as it prioritizes communities' needs and ensures that communities retain copyright and control over their cultural heritage materials. Indigitization is a joint project of IKBLC, the Museum of Anthropology, the iSchool at UBC, and Northern BC Archives (at UNBC), and continuously receives feedback from Indigenous project partners and grantees through initiatives such as the Indigenous Futures Forum held in 2016.

=== Multimedia repository ===
Webcasts of lectures are archived and accessible through the Webcasts Portal.

== Chapman Learning Commons ==
The Chapman Learning Commons, in a refurbished central section of the Learning Centre, provides space for group work as well as seating for individual study. It provides support and services for research and information literacy instruction, writing assistance, learning skills programs and technology through one-to-one help, workshops, peer mentoring and virtual resources and services.

== Facilities ==
- Music, Art & Architecture Library
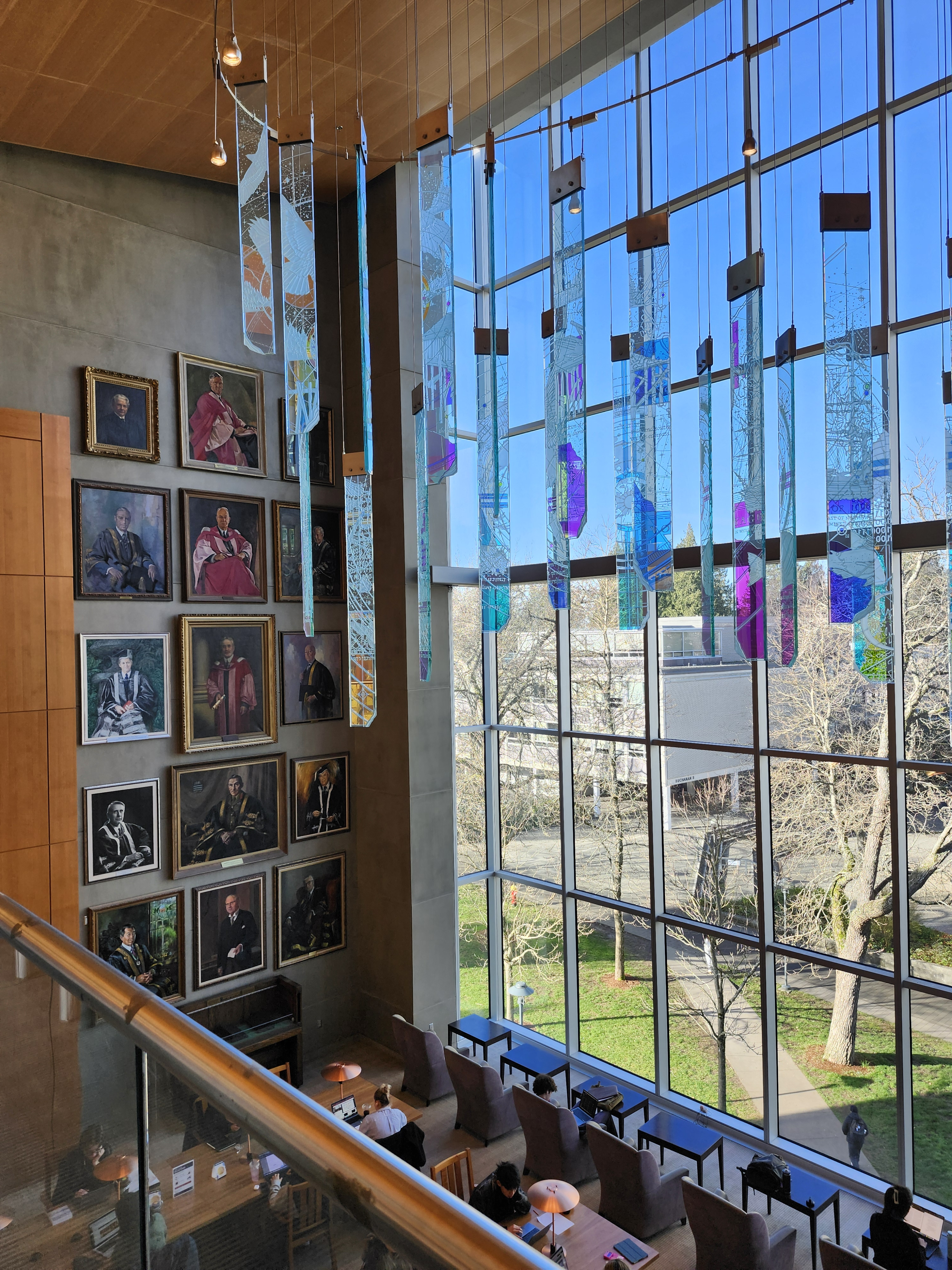
  Ridington Reading Room. Walls feature portraits of Chancellors of the University of British Columbia as well as a glass art installation by John Nutter, commissioned by Jean Barber.
- Collection space for 2,100,000 volumes including open stack shelving and 1,800,000 item capacity with the automated storage and retrieval system (ASRS)
- Rare Books and Special Collections
- Climate-controlled vault for rare books and archives
- The Wallace B. and Madeline H. Chung Collection
- iSchool@UBC: School of Library, Archival and Information Studies (iSchool)
- Center for Teaching, Learning and Technology (CTLT)
- Gateway Programs – Arts One, Science One, Coordinated Arts and Coordinated Science
- Dodson and Lillooet Rooms
- 157-seat Victoria Learning Theatre
- Classrooms, seminar rooms, project rooms, boardrooms
- Ridington Reading Room and Musqueam Reading Room
- Ike’s Café with a seating capacity of more than 80 persons
