= UBC School of Information =

Graduate school at the University of British Columbia

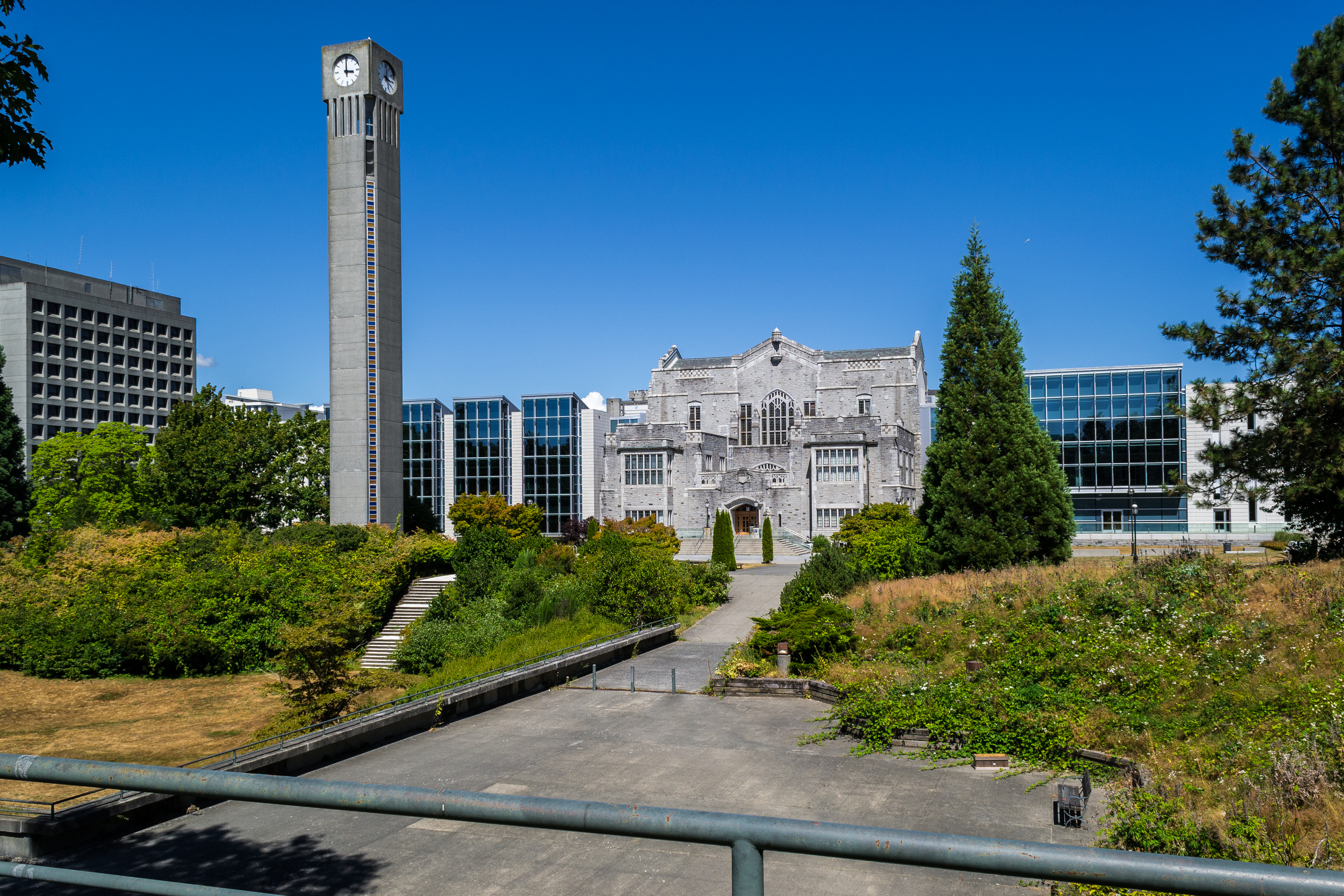
- Irving K. Barber Centre
- Type: Public
- Established: 1961
- Affiliations: University of British Columbia, Vancouver
- Director: Luanne Sinnamon
- Administrative staff: More than 20 staff and faculty (15 full-time tenured/tracked faculty), 25 seasonal lecturers
- Postgraduates: 130 MLIS, 30 MAS, 30-40 Dual, 20 MACL, 15-18 PhD
- Location: Vancouver, British Columbia, Canada; 49.2677°N 123.2528°W
- Campus: Urban, 402 ha (993 acres)
- Colours: Green
- Website: ischool.ubc.ca

The UBC School of Information (iSchool) is a graduate school at the University of British Columbia in Vancouver offering a Master of Archival Studies (MAS), a Master of Arts in Children's Literature (MACL), a Master of Library and Information Studies (MLIS), a DUAL Master of Archival Studies/Master of Library and Information Studies (MASLIS) and a Doctor of Philosophy in Library, Archival and Information Studies (Ph.D.). Founded in 1961 as the School of Librarianship, the iSchool is currently located in the Irving K. Barber Learning Centre. The school changed its name in 2020, but was previously known as the School of Library, Archival and Information Studies (SLAIS or SLAIS, The iSchool at UBC). UBC iSchool is an internationally ranked, multi-disciplinary school, ranked first in the world for graduate education in library and information management based on 2019 and 2020 QS ranking.

== Academic programs ==
UBC iSchool offers four master's degrees and a doctoral degree. Students can also specialize in the First Nations Curriculum Concentration if they want to work with, or within Indigenous knowledge organizations.

The Master of Archival Studies and Master of Library and Information Studies degrees are 48-credit programs, consisting primarily of coursework, with an optional 12-credit thesis option.

The Master of Library and Information Studies degree is accredited by the American Library Association. The degree was first offered in 1995 and superseded the Master of Library Studies, which had been offered since 1971. Prior to that, the school offered a one-year Bachelor of Library Science.

The Master of Archival Studies degree program follows the guidelines for archival education published by the Association of Canadian Archivists and the Society of American Archivists. The degree program began in 1981 and was the first stand-alone degree program in archival science in Canada or the United States.

The Dual Master of Archival Studies/Master of Library and Information Studies program enables students to earn both the MAS and MLIS degrees within three to five years, following the completion of 81 credits.

The Master of Arts in Children's Literature is a 30-credit interdisciplinary program, composed of courses from the departments of English, French, Language and Literacy Education, Theatre and the School of Information.

The Doctor of Philosophy in Library, Archival and Information Studies program was introduced in 2003, with Archival Studies and Library and Information Studies streams.

== Research ==
Research is carried out across a number of areas.

=== New Media ===
At the iSchool, a number of faculty do research in the new media space: Internet research, online social networks, e-learning, new media literacy, youth and new media, e-books, social media, open data and government, user engagement, social tagging, researchers on GRAND (Graphics, Animation and New Media), as well as faculty associated with the Faculty of Art's Bachelor of Media Studies.

=== Human-Computer Interaction (HCI) ===
HCI is necessarily an interdisciplinary field, engaging researchers who design, build, test, evaluate and examine the impact of new computer implementations for individual, group and community use across levels of skill, ability, and facility with technology. It addresses multiple contexts from work to learning and includes both fixed and mobile technologies and applications.

=== Cultural Heritage ===
Collection, preservation, access and use in library, archival and museum contexts, as augmented and challenged by digitization, digital production (‘born digital’ materials), participatory culture, and access through contemporary media. Cultural Heritage Management addresses what in the cultural realm will be retained, by whom, in what manner, and with what access (i.e. whose history will be digitized, retained and made available). Research addresses both traditional and newly emerging contexts. It includes new access protocols and technologies for physical and digitized cultural artifacts held in traditional institutions, documentation, preservation, and sustainability of cultural knowledge and practices. For example, professors and students from the iSchool at UBC work with the Irving K. Barber Learning Centre and others to support the Indigitization program, which provides funding and training for Indigenous communities and organizations to digitize cultural heritage materials.

=== Records and Information Management ===
Archival science is concerned broadly with the creation and preservation of representations of transactions (i.e., records and archives) that can provide information and evidence about past activities of individuals and organizations. Archival Science explores the theoretical and practical conditions that lead to, or work against, creation and preservation of persistent and trustworthy records and archives. It also touches on issues of representation, openness, transparency, privacy, security, accountability, internal control, compliance and risk and risk management.

=== Children and Young Adult Literature and Services ===
This research depends on a multi-disciplinary approach bringing an understanding of child development, cognition, literacy, and literary analysis to bear on creative and critical evaluation of children's literature and young adult literature in traditional and new media formats.
