= Irving K. Barber =

Canadian businessman

Irving K. "Ike" Barber OC OBC
- Born: Irving Kearl Barber; February 14, 1923; Edmonton, Alberta, Canada
- Died: April 13, 2012 (aged 89); Tsawwassen, British Columbia, Canada
- Education: Bachelor of Science in Forestry (BSF), UBC, 1950; Honorary Doctorate of Law (LL.D), UBC, 2002; Honorary Doctorate of Law (LL.D), UNBC, 2002; Honorary Doctorate of Law (LL.D), JIBC, 2012
- Known for: Entrepreneurship; Philanthropy
- Spouse: Jean Barber (m. 1943)
- Children: 3

Irving Kearl "Ike" Barber OC OBC (February 14, 1923 – April 13, 2012) was a Canadian forest industrialist and philanthropist. Though originally from Alberta, Barber spent most of his life in British Columbia, where he founded Slocan Forest Products Ltd., a lumber-producing company. He then went on to use his resource-based fortune to become one of BC's most prominent education philanthropists. Barber made significant donations to the University of British Columbia, as well as many other schools across the province, until his death in 2012.

== Personal life and career ==
Barber was born in Edmonton, Alberta in 1923, where he attended school until he dropped out in grade 11. He then travelled to the Peace River Region of British Columbia, where he worked as a parts man for Caterpillar Tractor in Fort St. John until the beginning of the Second World War.

During World War II, Barber spent five years in the Royal Canadian Air Force working as a flight instructor. After his war service, he was given Department of Veterans Affairs credits from the Government of Canada, entitling him to one free month of university education for every month served during the war. Though Barber had initially planned on becoming a forest ranger in British Columbia upon his return from war, he decided instead to use his credits to attend the University of British Columbia in 1945, where he graduated with a Bachelor of Science in forestry in 1950. Barber credited this "second chance at education" as a main reason for his future support of various education programs in BC.

Barber qualified as a Professional Registered Forester in 1952, and went on to work in British Columbia's forestry industry for 57 years. Barber initially worked for MacMillan Bloedel and Triangle Pacific, but in 1978 he bought the Slocan sawmill and founded Slocan Forest Products Ltd. Barber spent the next 23 years building it into one of the most prominent lumber producers in North America before retiring as its chairman in 2002.

Barber died at his home in Tsawwassen, British Columbia in 2012 at the age of 89.

== Philanthropy ==
Barber was passionate about improving the quality of education and access to education for students of British Columbia, and donated millions of dollars to various schools and educational causes across the province.

In 1999, Barber donated $500,000 to the University of Northern British Columbia in order to establish the I.K. Barber Enhanced Forest Laboratory.

In 2001, Barber donated $2.5 million to the University of British Columbia in order to establish research programs at the university, such as the Irving K. Barber Diabetes Research Endowment Fund at UBC and the Ike Barber Human Islet Transplant Laboratory at Vancouver General Hospital in partnership with UBC.

In 2002, Barber donated $20 million to the Vancouver campus of the University of British Columbia in order to update their main library and build the Irving K. Barber Learning Centre. In 2004, Barber donated $10 million to establish both the Irving K. Barber School of Arts and Sciences and the Irving K. Barber Learning Centre Interface Program at UBC's Okanagan campus.

Also in 2004, the Irving K. Barber British Columbia Scholarship Society was established, and Barber assisted the society in funding the Barber Transfer Scholarship and the Aboriginal Student Award program.

In 2010, Barber donated $2.5 million to Kwantlen Polytechnic University to establish the Irving K. Barber Endowment for Educational Opportunities. Also in 2010, Barber donated $1.5 million to Thompson Rivers University for the Irving K. Barber British Columbia Centre.

In 2012, Barber donated $250,000 to the Justice Institute of British Columbia in order to establish a new Aboriginal Justice Worker Certificate.

== Awards and honours ==
In 1993, Barber was inducted into the Canadian Business Hall of Fame.

In 1996, he was awarded the Forest Excellence Award in Communications for his work in publishing the book The Working Forest of British Columbia.

In 1997, Barber was presented with the Ernst and Young Entrepreneur of the Year Award for the Pacific Region.

In 1999, he was named the Distinguished Forester of the Year by the Registered Professional Foresters Association.

In 2002, both the University of British Columbia and the University of Northern British Columbia conferred Honorary Doctorate of Law (LL.D) degrees to Barber.

In 2003, Barber was recognized by the Order of British Columbia, and in 2004, he became an Officer of the Order of Canada for both his contributions to the forestry industry and his philanthropic work.

In 2012, the Justice Institute of British Columbia conferred an Honorary Doctorate of Law (LL.D) degree to Barber.

Barber also received the Golden Jubilee Medal (2002) and the Diamond Jubilee Medal (2012) for his outstanding contributions to Canada.
