= UBCO Tower =

Planned skyscraper in Canada

UBCO Tower is a skyscraper currently under construction in Kelowna, British Columbia. At 43 storeys tall, it will be the tallest building between Calgary and Metro Vancouver. It will serve as the downtown Kelowna campus of the University of British Columbia Okanagan.

Originally expected to open in 2027, that deadline was pushed back to 2028 due to a construction stoppage during excavation when cracks started to appear in some nearby buildings. One of those buildings had to be condemned.

8 floors will be used for academic space, including nursing, social work, and some other professional programs. There will also be 508 residential units for students.
