= Okanagan Regional Library =

Library system serving Okanagan region, British Columbia, Canada

Okanagan Regional Library Administrative Centre
- 49.86166683562736°N 119.46892081594086°W
- Location: 1430 K.L.O. Rd; Kelowna, British Columbia; V1W 3P6
- Established: 1936
- Branches: 30

Collection
- Items collected: books, e-books, music, cds, periodicals, maps, genealogical archives, business directories, local history
- Size: 25,000 (2011)

Access and use
- Circulation: 3.2 M (2013)
- Population served: 400,000

Other information
- Website: ORL website

The Okanagan Regional Library (ORL) system serves the Okanagan region of the Canadian province of British Columbia. Its administrative headquarters are in Kelowna. The system covers 59,000 square kilometers of area, and serves 360,000 people through 30 branches. ORL was founded in 1936. In 2013, the library held 3.2 million physical items. The library is largely funded through tax revenues from four administrative areas, the Regional District of North Okanagan, the Regional District of Central Okanagan, the Columbia-Shuswap Regional District, and the Regional District of Okanagan Similkameen. It also receives funding from the provincial and federal governments.

In November 2018, the ORL collaborated with the University of British Columbia Okanagan (UBCO) to open an on-campus branch to serve the UBCO community.

In 2019 the first Makerspace was added to the ORL system at the Westside Learning Lab. Soon after a makerspace in the Downtown Kelowna, Vernon, Lumby, Golden, and Revelstoke library branches. Makerspaces are equipped with maker technologies including: 3D printers, recording studios, Cricut Makers, Glowforge laser cutters, and sublimation printers and heat presses.

Patrons of the library are also able to borrow more than books. The ORL has a Library of Things (LoT) that houses different kits and technologies that can be checked out for a period of time. Different kits in the LoT include: outdoor activity kits, Snap Circuits, birding backpacks, Sphero Bolt, Ozobot Evo, Code and Go Robot Mouse, microscope, Home Energy thermal camera, radon detector, and carbon dioxide monitor.

The Westbank Branch has an active writers group: Westbank Writers' Group. Members meet weekly to share and discuss their writings.

== Locations ==
- Armstrong
- Cherryville
- Enderby
- Falkland
- Golden
- Hedley
- Kaleden
- Kelowna
- Keremeos
- Lake Country
- Lumby
- Mission Branch
- Naramata
- North Shuswap
- Okanagan Falls
- Oliver
- Osoyoos
- Peachland
- Princeton
- Revelstoke
- Rutland
- Salmon Arm
- Sicamous
- Silver Creek
- South Shuswap
- Summerland
- University of British Columbia (Okanagan Campus)
- Vernon
- Westbank
- Westside Learning Lab

== History ==
In 1935, residents of the Okanagan participated in a referendum to decide whether to start a library system in the valley. After a majority voted "yes", the first Kelowna library, then called the Okanagan Union Library, was constructed. The original collection was 18,000 items, and served a population of about 25,000.
