= University of British Columbia Okanagan =

University campus in Kelowna, Canada

Coordinates: 49.9396°N 119.3963°W

The University of British Columbia Okanagan
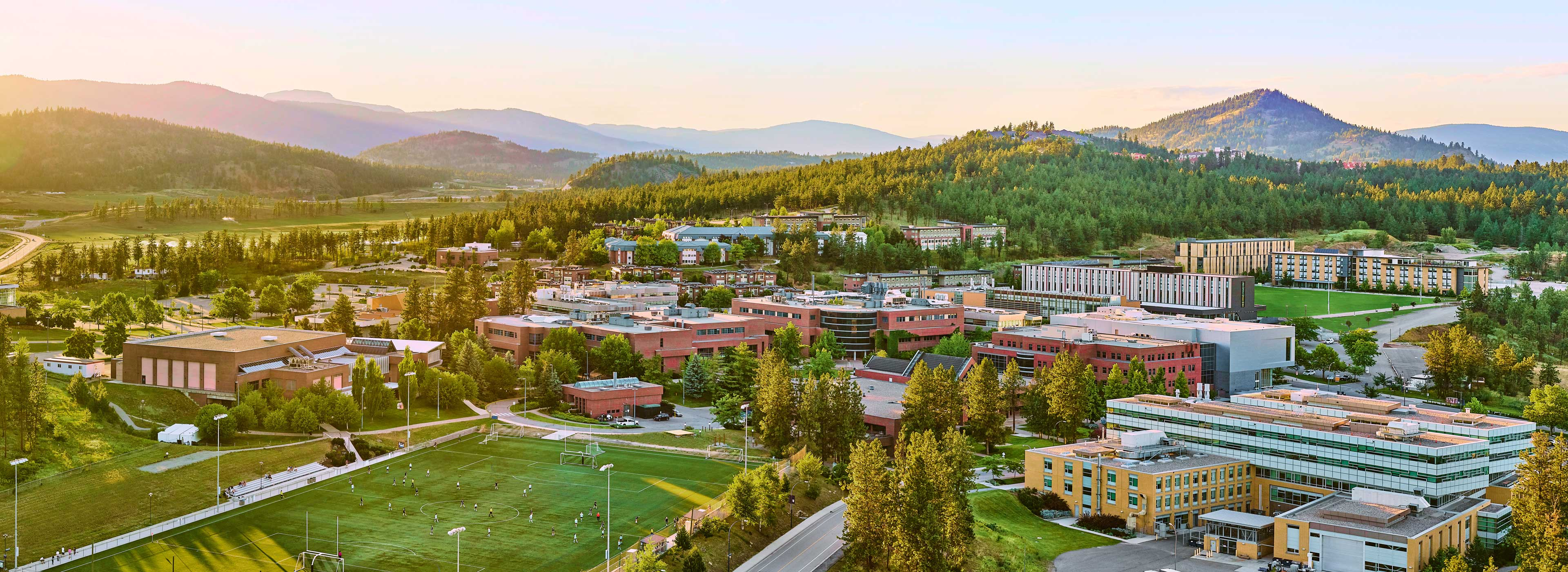
- Aerial view of the campus in 2024
- Other name: Okanagan Campus
- Type: Public
- Established: 2005; 21 years ago
- Parent institution: University of British Columbia
- Provost: Rehan Sadiq
- Principal: Lesley Cormack
- Academic staff: 707
- Total staff: 1,366
- Undergraduates: 10,514
- Postgraduates: 1,399
- Location: 3333 University Way, Kelowna, British Columbia, V1V 1V7, Canada
- Campus: Suburban
- Nickname: Heat
- Website: ok.ubc.ca

The University of British Columbia Okanagan (also known as UBC Okanagan or UBCO) is a campus of the University of British Columbia in Kelowna, British Columbia, Canada.

This campus is the research and innovation hub in the province's southern interior, in British Columbia's Okanagan Valley and home to over 11,913 undergraduate and graduate students. UBC Okanagan has 62 undergraduate programs and 19 graduate programs.

== History ==
=== Okanagan University College ===
The current site of UBC Okanagan was initially used by Okanagan University College (OUC), which was founded in 1989 (in principle) as a part of a plan by the government to improve access to post-secondary education in the Southern Interior of British Columbia. Initially, degrees were awarded in partnership with other universities, but by 1995, the university college began granting degrees in its name. In the late 1990s, OUC started lobbying efforts to gain full university status.

=== University of British Columbia ===
In December 2002, the British Columbia Progress Board submitted a report to the provincial government, recognizing the need to expand post-secondary education in the Okanagan. The board, chaired by the University of British Columbia president Martha Piper, recommended that the province extend "the mandate of an existing provincial University to Kelowna".

In March 2004, British Columbia premier Gordon Campbell and UBC president Martha Piper held a press conference, announcing that OUC would be dissolved. OUC's university operations would be consolidated at its North Kelowna Campus and would come under the University of British Columbia. The other programs and campuses of OUC would form a new community college, which would later take on the name Okanagan College. The OUC board was reportedly not invited to the press conference. It had not been told in advance of the imminent demise of the OUC Board and removal or the termination of the majority of the OUC board members.

== Academics ==
UBC Okanagan offers a wide range of undergraduate and graduate (Ph.D. & Masters) programs. There are more than 50 undergraduate programs in Arts, Education, Engineering, Fine Arts, Human Kinetics, Management, Media, Medicine, Nursing, and Sciences. The university also offers graduate programs in the following areas: Biology, Biochemistry, and Molecular Biology, Chemistry, Physics, Computer Sciences, Education, Engineering, English, Earth, and Environmental Sciences, Fine Arts, Interdisciplinary Graduate Studies, Management, Mathematics, Medical Physics, Nursing, Psychology, and Social Work.

== Research ==
Since its establishment in 2005, the research capability and researcher profiles have increased rapidly. Annual tri-council funding increased from $1.1M to $5.9M between 2005 and 2015. The total research funding reached $14.7M/year, with 714 projects in 2015. The Survive and Thrive Applied Research (STAR) initiative projects include control software for unmanned aerial vehicles. STAR creates a bridge between UBC Okanagan and industry, specializing in technologies for human protection and performance in extreme, remote, or rural conditions. UBCO has 15 research centres and 505 faculty members.

== Campus ==
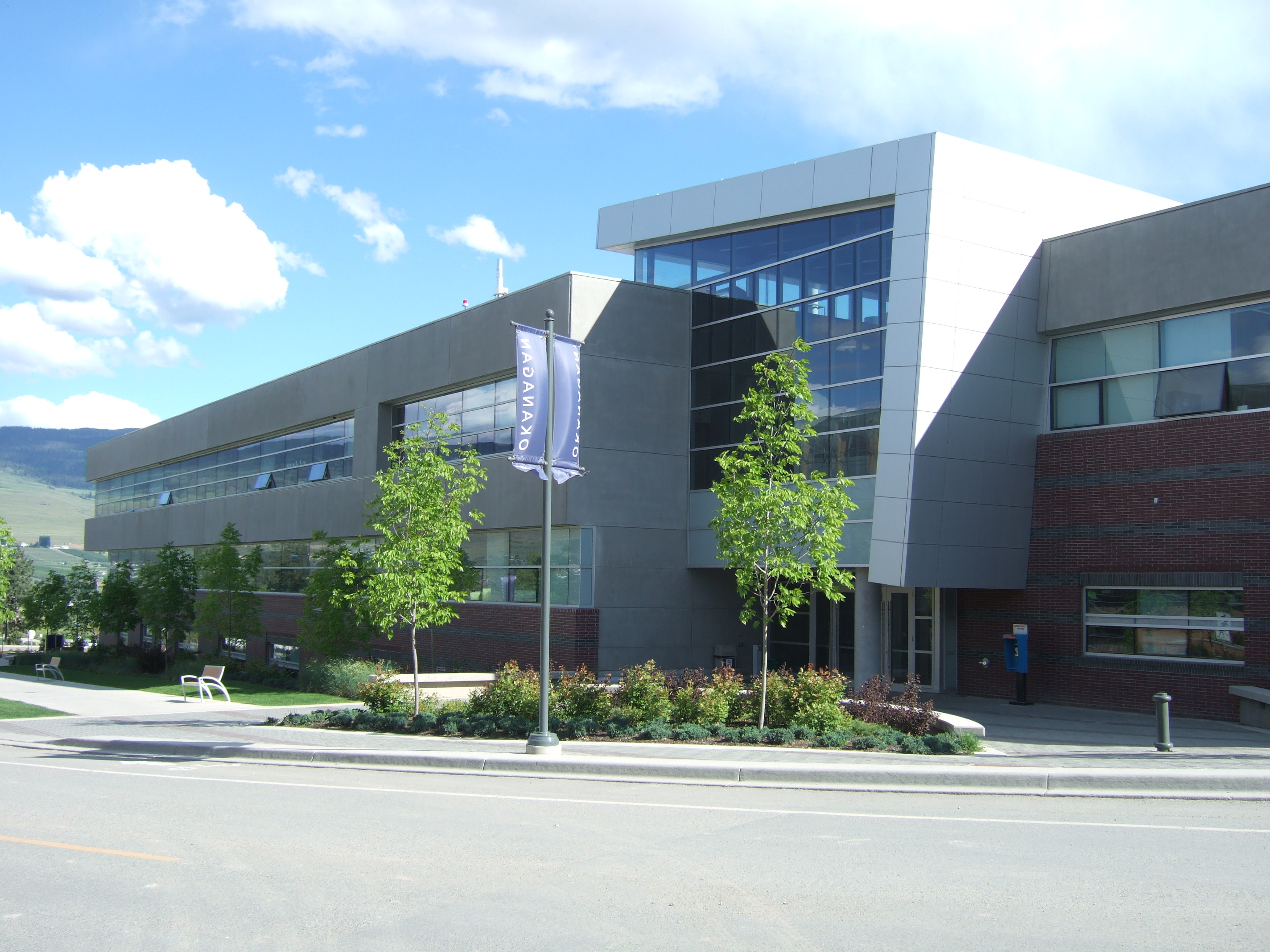
Charles E. Fipke Centre for Innovative Research

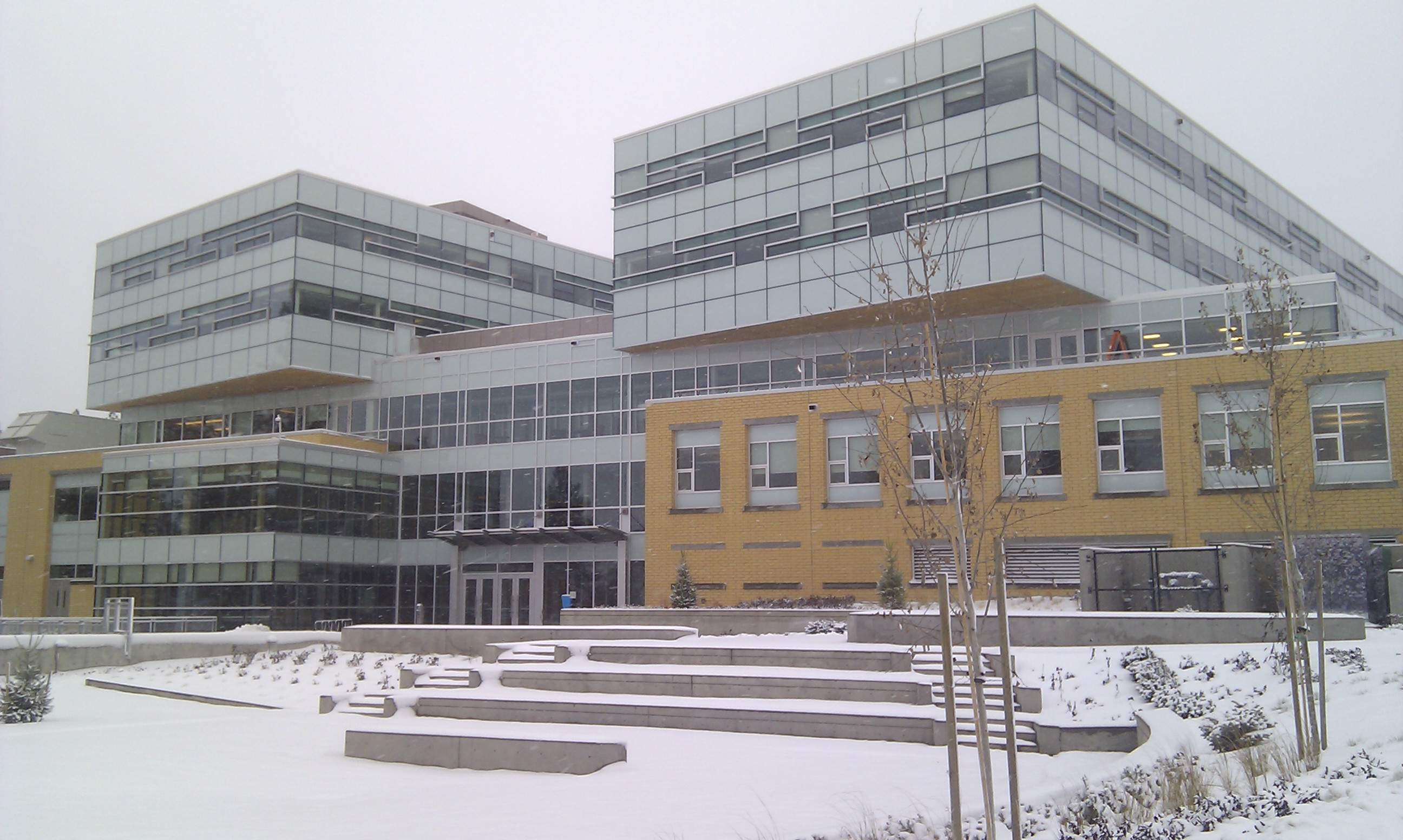
Engineering, Management and Education (EME) Complex

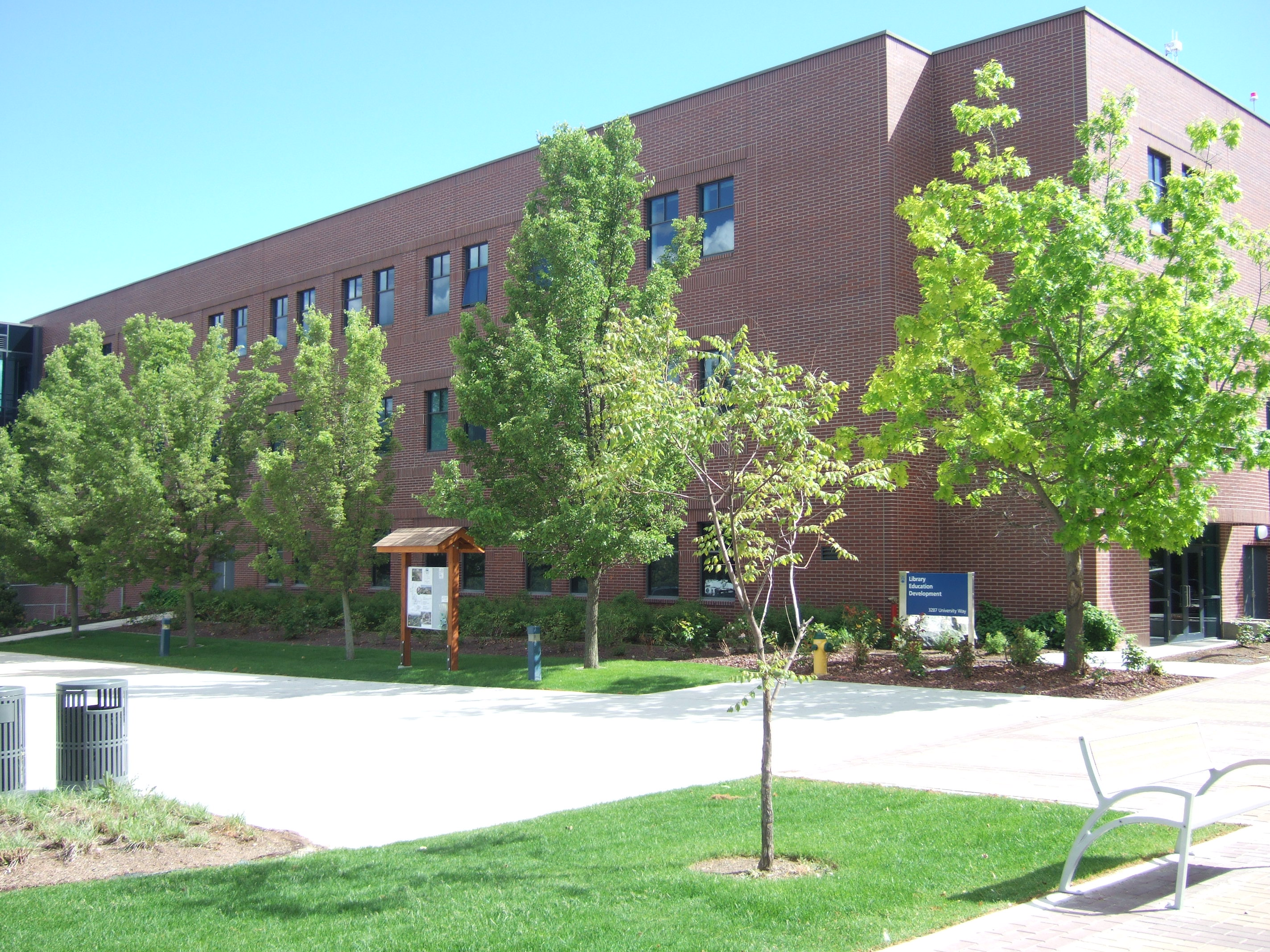
The original UBC Okanagan Library before The Commons expansion in 2018

The UBC Okanagan campus is situated on a hill between Glenmore and Ellison in Kelowna. Street names are signed in English and Nsyilxcən language. The campus consists of Upper Campus, Lower Campus, Innovation Precinct, and Endowment Lands.

The Lower and Upper Campuses are situated around the Courtyard and University Walk hosts UBCO's core academic and administrative functions. Most institutional and administrative buildings are located on the Lower Campus, including the UBC Okanagan Library, Learning Commons and the Transit Exchange.

The Charles E. Fipke Centre for Innovative Research (FIP) is a multi-purpose academic and research facility, including research labs, classrooms and teaching labs, offices, student commons, lecture theatre. The Arts and Sciences Centre (ASC), and Engineering, Management and Education Building (EME) were completed in 2011.

The expansion of UBC Faculty of Medicine created a new distributed medical site, the Southern Medical Program at UBC Okanagan. Part of the program is also located in the Clinical Academic Campus building adjacent to the Kelowna General Hospital.

Learning Commons Building, referred to simply as The Commons, opened in late 2018 as part of the UBC Okanagan Library expansion and contains study spaces, media labs, special collections and archives.

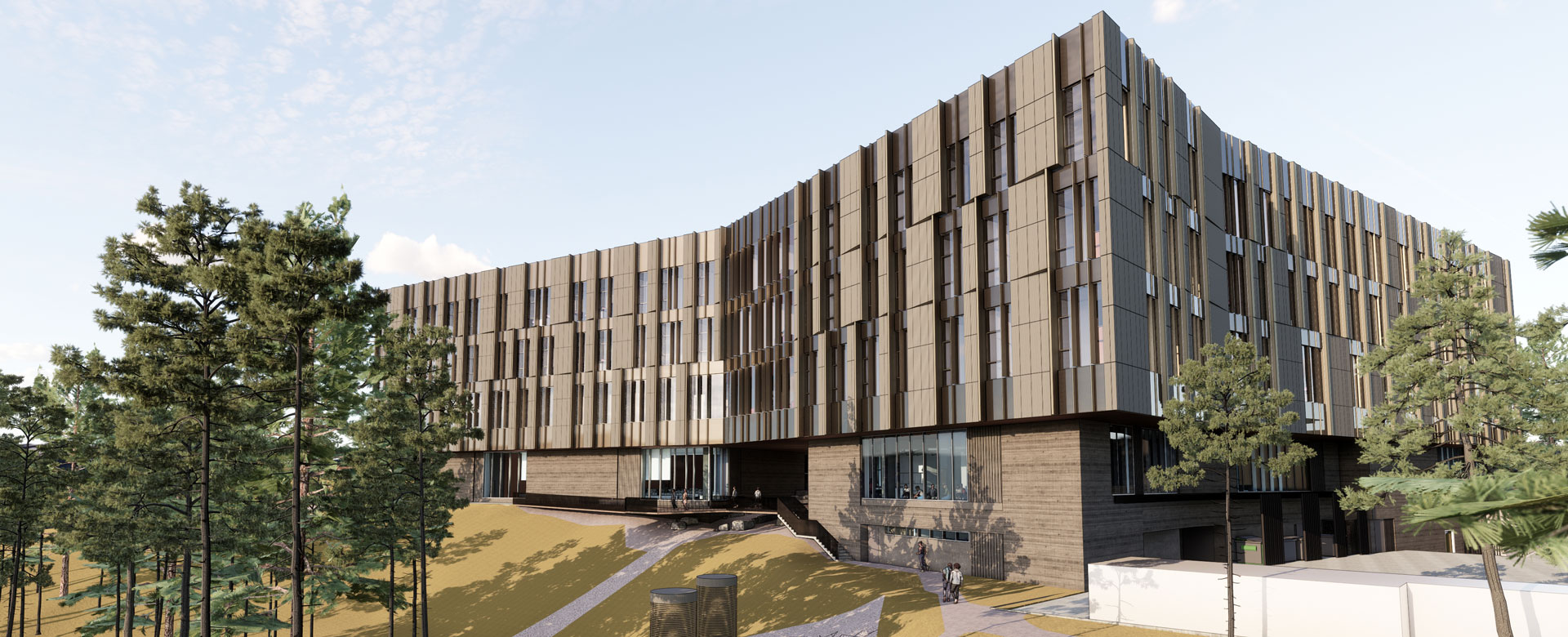
x̌əl sic snpax̌nwixʷtn building on UBCO campus

x̌əl sic snpax̌nwixʷtn, a Nsyilxcən name gifted to the university by the En'owkin Centre, also known as the Interdisciplinary Collaboration and Innovation (ICI) Building, is under construction south of the EME. The building will contain lecture halls, offices, various labs, workstations, and research facilities. Construction began in 2023 and is expected to be completed in 2026, at an estimated cost of $119 million.

The Innovation Precinct is 24.2-hectare (60-acre) land located at the bottom of the hill along Innovation Drive.

UBC Endowment Lands (West Campus Lands) is 103.6-hectare (256-acre) agricultural land, which occupies the western half of the Okanagan campus along John Hindle Drive and contains UBC Plant Growth Facility. UBC Endowment Lands are part of ALR and are reserved for future research and recreational uses. It is not to be confused with University Endowment Lands, an unincorporated area adjacent to Vancouver next to the UBC Point Grey campus.

=== Downtown Kelowna Campus ===
UBC Okanagan also has a presence in Downtown Kelowna with UBC Innovation Library, located in the downtown Kelowna branch of the Okanagan Regional Library, and the Innovation UBC Hub, located in the Innovation Centre.

UBC announced in June 2020 that it is planning to expand its presence in Downtown Kelowna by constructing a new 43 storey mixed-use tower on Doyle Avenue. Construction was approved in August 2023 and is expected to be completed in 2027. The building will include spaces for health programs, community engagement, and an art gallery.

There is also a Southern Medical Clinical Academic Campus located at Kelowna General Hospital.

=== Expansion ===
According to the UBC Okanagan Campus Plan from September 2015, the next 20 years will see drastic expansion in research, teaching, student residence, and commercial spaces. A proposed 85,292-square-metre (918,080 sq ft) increase in academic space would more than double the current capacity. The student residence is proposed to increase by approximately 2,200 beds to a total of approximately 3,900 beds. Commercial space would increase from 2,411 square metres (25,950 sq ft) to 4,561 square metres (49,090 sq ft). The additional space will remain within the main Okanagan campus, rather than expanding into the West Endowment Lands. Sustainability upgrades to 11 of the existing buildings are also underway.

Future projects include the newly constructed Nechako Commons Block building adjacent to the UNC (University Centre), additional residences, an engineering design building, a retrofit of a nearby industrial building billed as Innovation Precinct, and various other, more minor projects.

== Student life ==
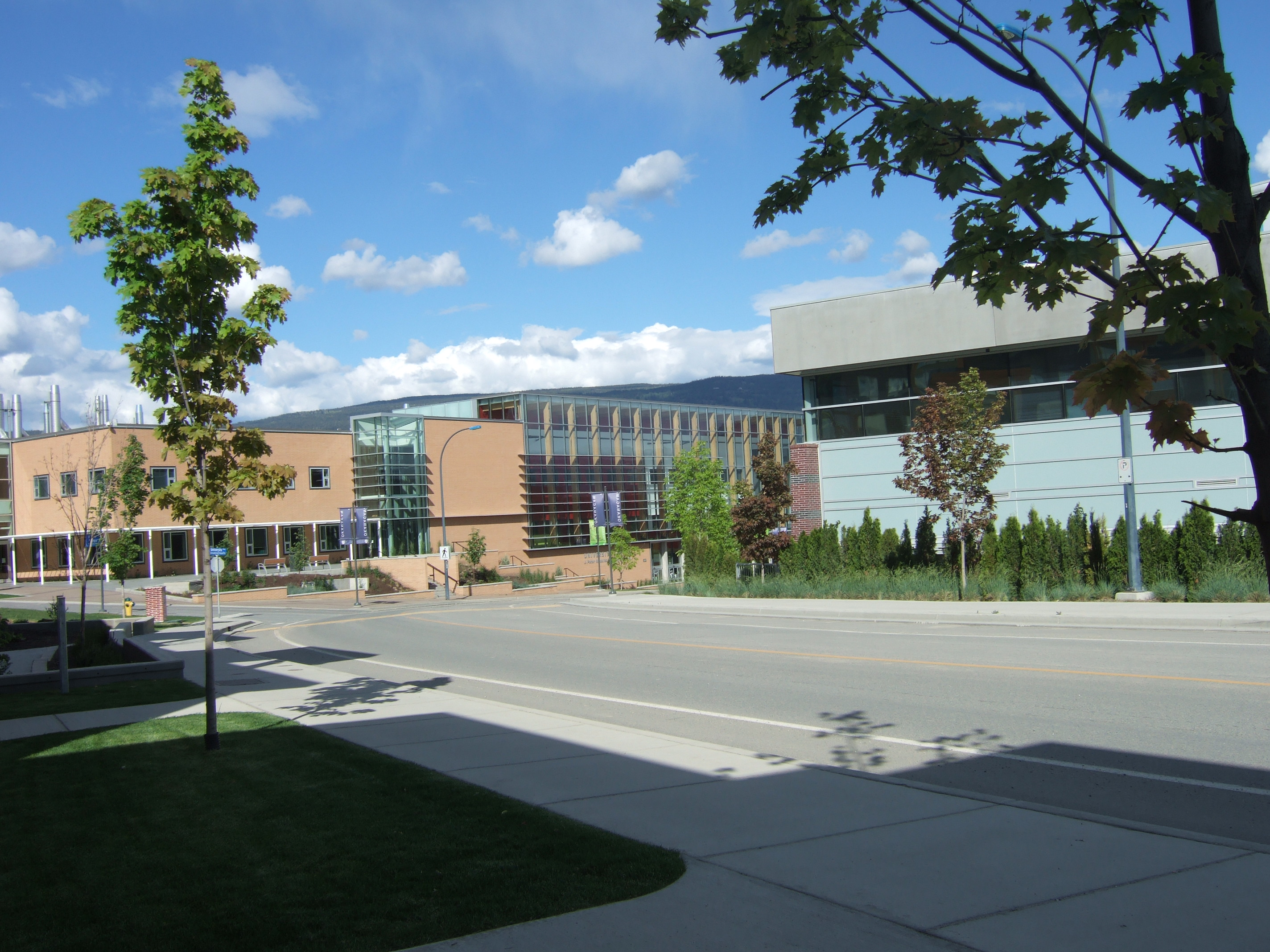
University Centre

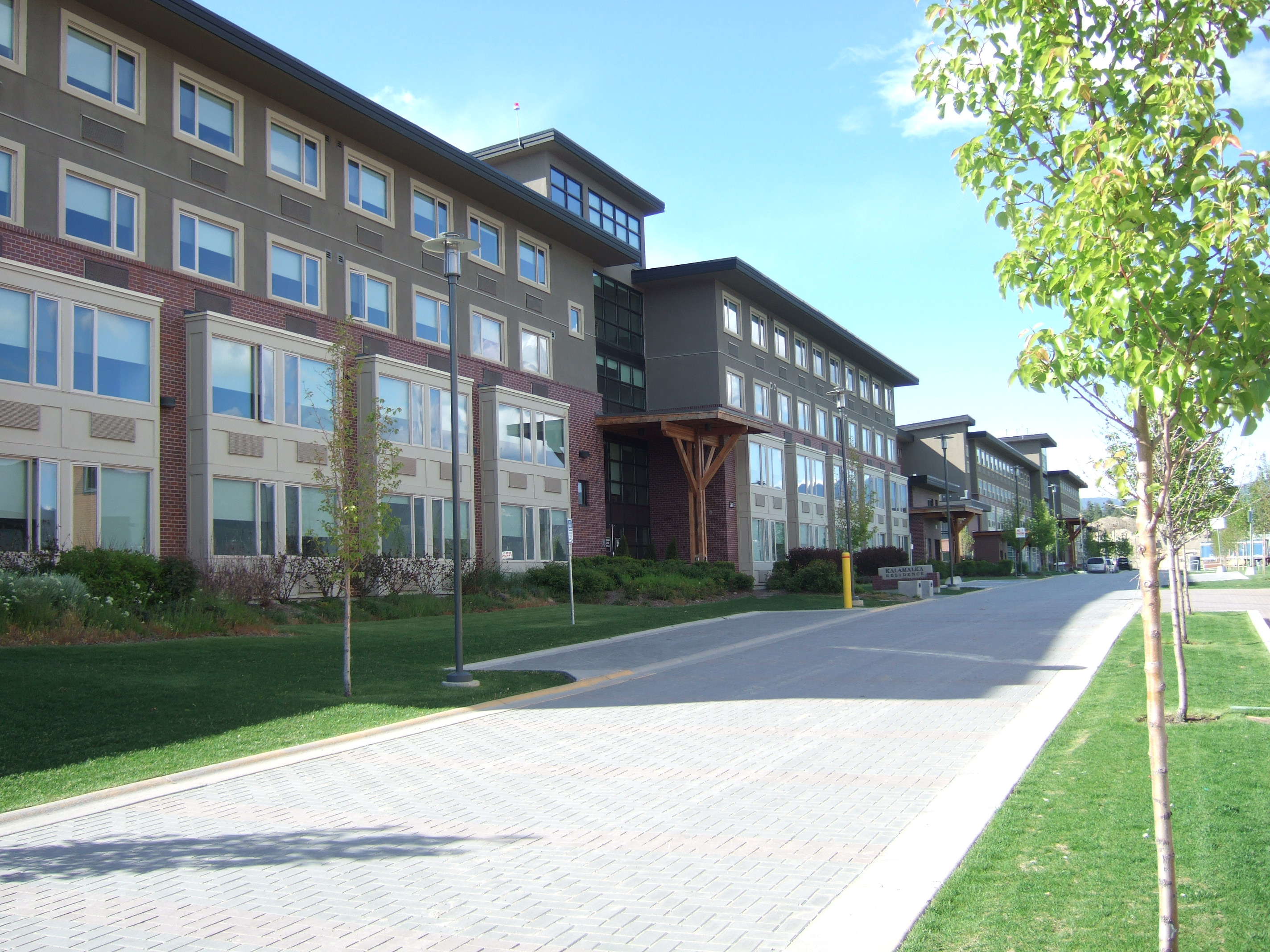
Student residences

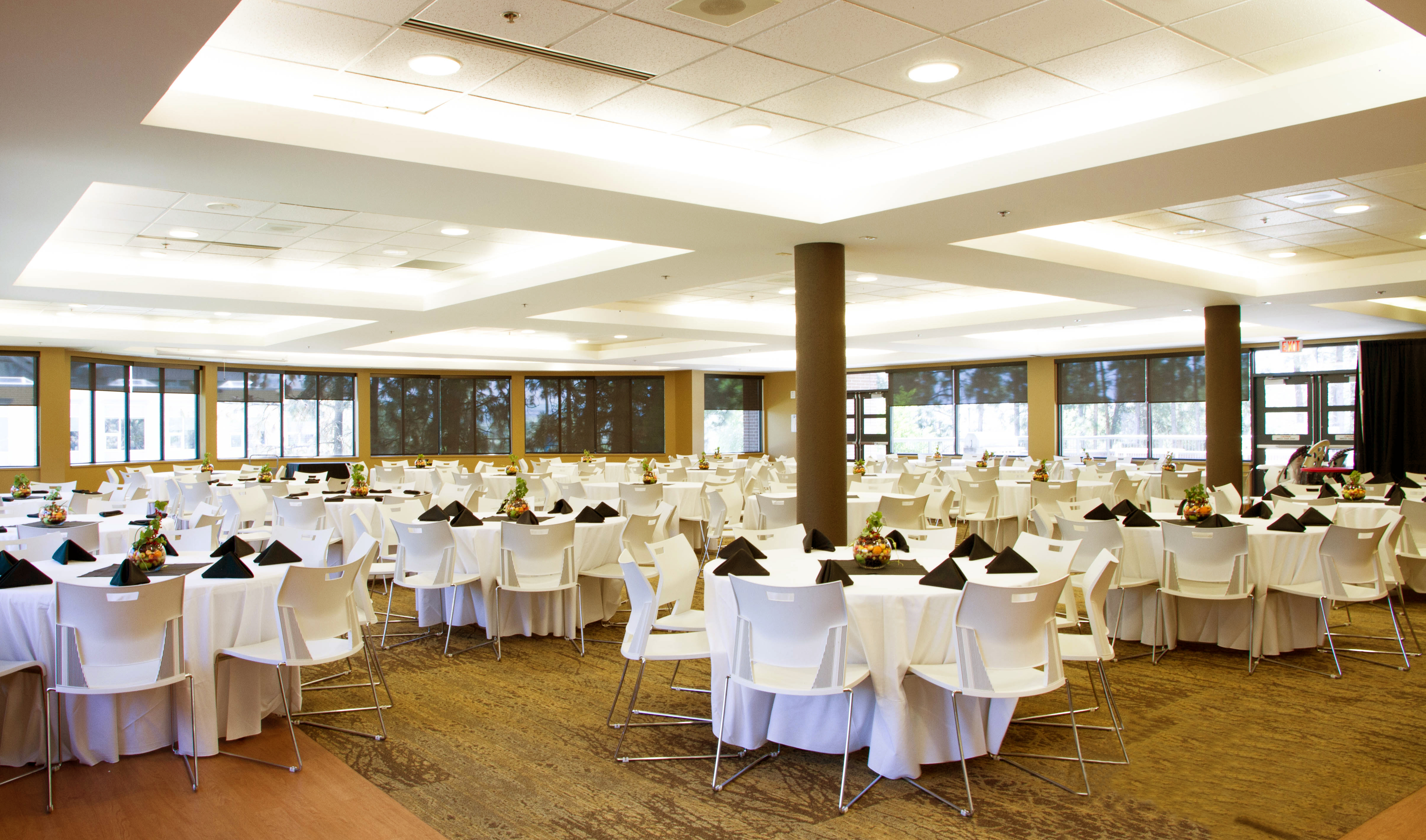
Sunshine cafeteria operated by UBC Food Services

The University Centre (UNC) contains many student services, including the Students' Union Okanagan of UBC office, meeting rooms, student club space, cafeteria and pub, cinema, multi-faith space, UBC Health & Wellness Clinic, learning centres, the Collegia, as well as Picnic, which is a new centre where students can seek mental and sexual health support.

=== Collegia ===
Common rooms known as Collegia were created for commuter students, containing kitchen facilities, study space, lounges, and social areas. Each Collegium has theme and targeted for a particular student population, but are open to all students.

=== Greek life ===
UBC Okanagan currently has two sororities and two fraternities.

== Campus media ==
=== The Phoenix ===
The Phoenix is the bi-weekly student newspaper at the University of British Columbia Okanagan. It was established in 1989 at the former Okanagan College.

=== UBCO.TV ===
UBC Studios Okanagan and UBC Communications Services took over the UBCO.TV functions and co-manages a YouTube channel.

== Faculties and schools ==
UBC Okanagan has the following faculties and schools:

- College of Graduate Studies
- Faculty of Creative and Critical Studies
- Faculty of Applied Sciences
  - School of Engineering
- Faculty of Health and Social Development
  - School of Nursing
  - School of Health and Exercise Sciences
  - School of Social Work
- Faculty of Medicine Southern Medical Program
- Faculty of Management
- Okanagan School of Education
- Irving K. Barber Faculty of Arts and Social Sciences
- Irving K. Barber Faculty of Science

== Notable alumni ==
People who attended UBC Okanagan include:

- bbno$
