= Gérard de Sède =

French author

- Born: Géraud-Marie de Sède de Liéoux; 5 June 1921; 17th arrondissement of Paris, France
- Died: 30 May 2004 (aged 82); Désertines, Allier, France
- Occupations: journalist, author
- Known for: Surrealism, Gisors, Rennes-le-Château

Géraud-Marie de Sède, baron de Liéoux (5 June 1921 – 30 May 2004) was a French author, writing under the nom-de-plume of Gérard de Sède, and a member of various surrealist organizations. He was born into an aristocratic family from Comminges, the son of Marcel Alfred Gustave de Sède, baron de Liéoux and Aimée de Sède de Liéoux 's first cousins, once removed. De Sède's father was the senior editor of the Catholic newspaper Le Courrier du Pas-de-Calais owned by the De Sède family.

De Sède authored more than 20 books and contributed articles to various magazines, sometimes using the pseudonyms Pumaz, Allard, Gillot and Simon. He is best known for his 1967 book L'Or de Rennes, ou La Vie insolite de Bérenger Saunière, curé de Rennes-le-Château ("The Gold of Rennes, or The Strange Life of Bérenger Saunière, Priest of Rennes-le-Château"), published as a paperback in 1968 entitled Le Trésor Maudit de Rennes-le-Château ("The Accursed Treasure of Rennes-le-Château"). A revised and updated version entitled Signé: Rose+Croix was published in 1977.

== Early life ==
After passing his Baccalauréat, de Sède began studying law and literature where he met his future wife Marie-Andrée at the Sorbonne. It was during this period that he established contacts with the Surrealists and began producing his first works.

In 1941, he was a member of the Surrealist group "La Main à Plume", which was named after a phrase by Arthur Rimbaud, "La main à plume vaut la main à charrue" ("The hand that writes is equal to the hand that ploughs").

The group published a series of pamphlets. Its third issue, in 1943, included Gérard de Sède's L'Incendie habitable ("The Inhabitable Fire").

Gérard de Sède was active in the war during the German occupation of Paris, working with the Forces Françaises de l'Intérieur (FFI), for which he received two citations. He was imprisoned by the Germans in Bourges.

Regarding the Resistance as a way of establishing a new world order, de Sède moved about in Trotskyist circles.

De Sède married Marie-Andrée in February 1947, commonly known as 'Sophie', who had been his companion in the resistance. He decided to study philosophy and became a pupil of Gaston Bachelard, under whom he wrote a dissertation on Jean-Jacques Rousseau.

At the beginning of the 1950s de Sède associated with the poets Nazim Hikmet and Edouard Glissant, and with the philosopher Henri Lefebvre. At the same time he re-established contact with André Breton.

Attracted by the politics of Marshal Tito, de Sède moved to Yugoslavia with his wife and children before returning to France, holding several jobs in journalism before deciding to become a farmer.

== Gisors ==
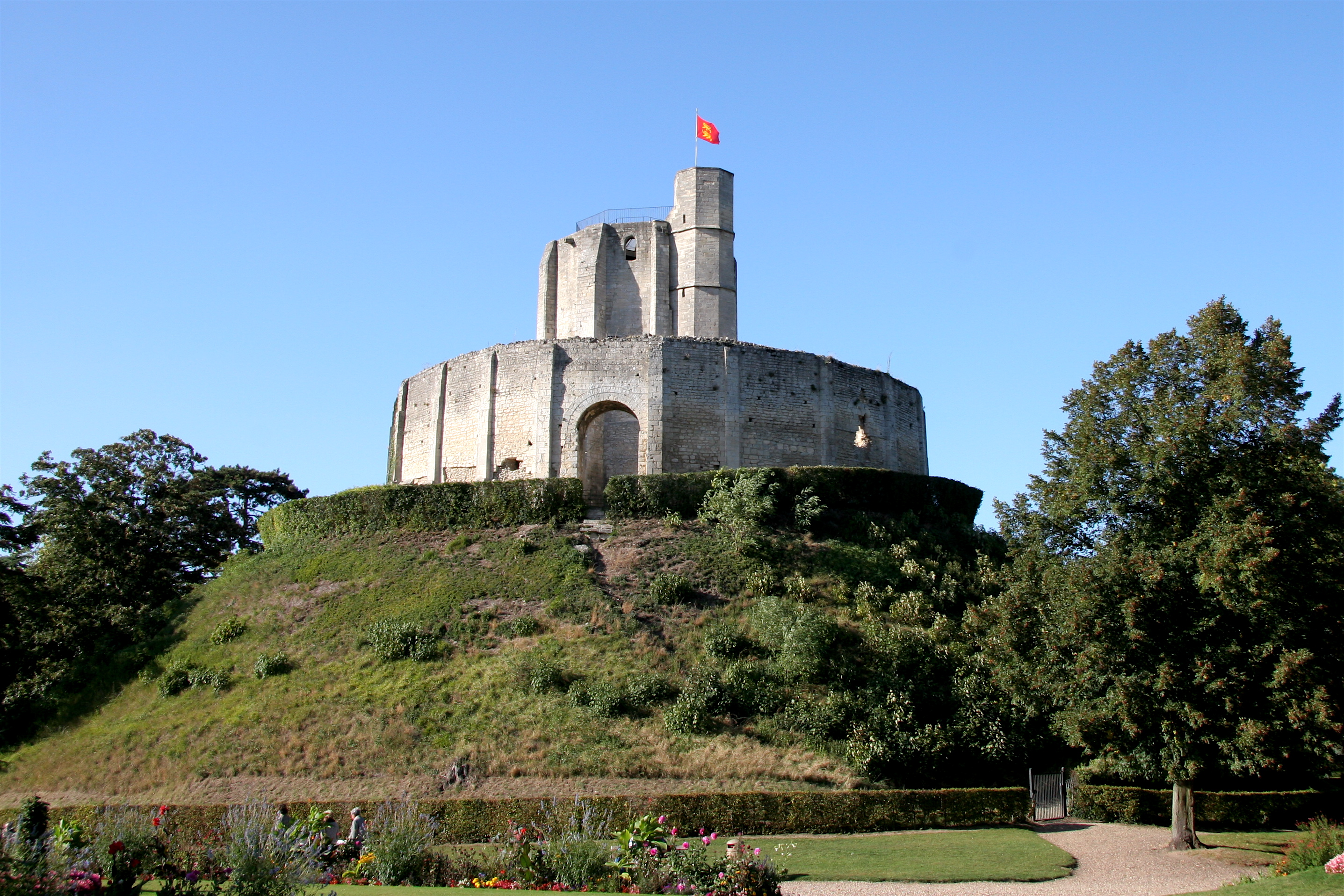
The 13th century keep of Gisors

It was during his period as a farmer that he employed and got to know Roger Lhomoy - Lhomoy had previously worked since 1929 as a tourist guide at the Château de Gisors in Normandy and claimed to have discovered under the tower donjon in March 1946, a secret entrance to a long basement thirty meters long, nine meters wide, and approximately four and a half meters high, saying it was a subterranean chapel dedicated to Saint Catherine. He alleged it contained nineteen sarcophagi of stone, each two meters long and sixty centimeters wide, with 30 iron coffers arranged in columns of ten. Lhomoy said it was the treasure of the Knights Templar These allegations inspired Gérard de Sède to write a magazine article about Gisors, that caught the attention of Pierre Plantard, who wrote to de Sède. They collaborated on Les Templiers sont parmi nous, ou, L'Enigme de Gisors ("The Templars are Amongst Us, or The Enigma of Gisors"), that was published in 1962, containing passing references to the Priory of Sion. Lhomoy was finally dismissed as a liar when in 1964 an official excavation produced a negative result. Philippe de Chérisey, a friend and associate of Pierre Plantard, later claimed in 1978 that the subterranean chapel contained "30 iron coffers of the archives of the Priory of Sion."

== L'Or de Rennes ==
Le Trésor Maudit de Rennes-le-Chateau, 1968

De Sède and Plantard collaborated next on the subject of Rennes-le-Château, resulting in the publication of L'Or de Rennes in 1967.

Originally a Pierre Plantard manuscript that failed to find a publisher, and extensively rewritten by Gérard de Sède, L'Or de Rennes presented as fact various claims about Bérenger Saunière and Rennes-le-Château that were the authors' inventions, in order to embellish a story about the discovery of a hidden secret. The book was most famous for its reproduction of two "parchments" that were allegedly discovered by the priest: but for a variety of different reasons they have been identified as forgeries by Philippe de Chérisey.

The central claim in L'Or de Rennes was that Saunière found parchments proving that the lineage of the "last" Merovingian king, Dagobert II, assassinated on 23 December 679, did not die with him as had previously been thought. His son was presumed to have escaped the massacre and took refuge at Rennes-le-Château, where he founded a line of descent before being buried in 758 in the church crypt. These genealogical documents implicated to an exceptional degree the Priory of Sion, a secret organisation working behind the scenes ever since the Carolingian and Capetian usurpations for the recognition of the legitimacy of the Merovingian line of descent to the throne of France. Pierre Plantard claimed to be descended from Dagobert II.

De Sède and Plantard fell out over book royalties relating to L'Or de Rennes and never worked together again, at the same time Philippe de Chérisey announced the "parchments" were his creations that he later elaborated upon in his 1978 unpublished document entitled L'Énigme de Rennes, claiming they were originally made for his friend Francis Blanche, as material for a French radio serial entitled Signé Furax. The story about the parchments was previously given in the 1977 document by Jean Delaude entitled Le Cercle d'Ulysse.

L'Or de Rennes was to have a lasting impact on British script-writer Henry Lincoln, who read the book while on holiday in the Cévennes in 1969, leading him to inspire three BBC Two Chronicle documentaries, as well as working some of its material into the 1982 bestseller Holy Blood, Holy Grail which itself was used as source material for the bestselling 2003 novel by Dan Brown, The Da Vinci Code.

== Later years ==
Gérard de Sède returned to the subject matter of Bérenger Saunière during the late 1980s writing Rennes-le-Château: le dossier, les impostures, les phantasmes, les hypothèses, discounting the Plantard-related material that had appeared over the previous 20 years. He claimed Saunière obtained his wealth from the Habsburgs in return for parchments containing "politico-genealogical secrets" about the descent of Louis XVII. He claimed the "Merovingian romance" was a parody where Dagobert II replaced Louis XVI, his son Sigebert IV replaced Louis XVII and Pierre Plantard replaced Charles-Guillaume Naundorff.

He afterwards moved to Nicaragua, then to Belgium, before returning to France during the 1990s.

Gérard de Sède died in Désertines (Montluçon), during the night of Saturday 29 to Sunday 30 May 2004, de Sède's coffin was draped with the flag of the Soviet Union. He was buried in Lieoux.

== Priory of Sion ==
In a 2005 TV documentary, de Sede's son Arnaud stated categorically that his father and Plantard had made up the existence of the Priory of Sion — to quote Arnaud de Sède in the programme, "it is absolute piffle".

== See also ==
- Dossiers Secrets

== Works ==
- Gérard de Sède, L'Incendie habitable (Paris: La Main à Plume, 1942).
- Gérard de Sède, Petite Encyclopédie des grandes Familles (with Sophie de Sède, Paris: Société des Éditions modernes). No date.
- Gérard de Sède, Les Templiers sont parmi nous, ou, L'Enigme de Gisors (Paris: René Julliard 1962). Reprinted by Éditions J'ai lu in 1968. Revised and amended edition by Plon in 1976. ISBN 2-259-00116-5
- Gérard de Sède, Le Trésor Cathare (Paris: René Julliard, 1966).
- Gérard de Sède, L'Or de Rennes, ou La Vie insolite de Bérenger Saunière, curé de Rennes-le-Château (with Sophie de Sède, Paris: René Julliard, 1967). Also published by Le Cercle du Nouveau Livre d'Histoire, 1967.
- Gérard de Sède, Pourquoi Prague? Le Dossier Tchecoslovaque 1945-1968 (with Antoine Berman, François Lourbert, Michel Abrami, Paris: J. Tallandier, 1968).
- Gérard de Sède, Le Trésor Maudit de Rennes-le-Château (with Sophie de Sède, Paris: Éditions J'ai lu. "L'Aventure mystérieuse" series, 1968).
- Gérard de Sède, Magie à Marsal (with François Lourbet, Paris: René Julliard, 1969)
- Gérard de Sède, La Race Fabuleuse, Extra-Terrestres Et Mythologie Mérovingienne (Paris: Éditions J'ai lu, 1973).
- Gérard de Sède, Le secret des Cathares (Paris: Éditions J'ai lu, 1974).
- Gérard de Sède, Le Vrai dossier de l'énigme de Rennes, réponse à M. Descadeillas, avec des documents inédits (Vestric: Éditions de l'Octogone, Collection Le Douzième arcane, 1975).
- Gérard de Sède, Aujourd'hui, les nobles (Paris: Alain Moreau, 1975).
- Gérard de Sède, Le Mystère gothique: des ruines aux cathédrales (Paris: Éditions Robert Laffont, 1976).
- Gérard de Sède, "Henri Boudet ou le jouer de Meaux." Preface to Henri Boudet, La Vrai Langue Celtique et le Cromleck de Rennes-les-Bains (Paris: Éditions de la Demeure Philosophale, 1978).
- Gérard de Sède, Le Sang des Cathares: l'Occitanie rebelle du Moyen âge (Paris: Plon, 1976). Reprinted by Paris: Presses pocket, 1978.
- Gérard de Sède, Du trésor de Delphes à la tragédie Cathare (Pygmalion, 1976) ISBN 2-85704-038-5
- Gérard de Sède, Signé: Rose+Croix: l'énigme de Rennes-le-Château (with the collaboration of Michèle Deuil, Paris: Plon, 1977).
- Gérard de Sède, Fatima: enquête sur une Imposture (Paris: Alain Moreau, 1977).
- Gérard de Sède, L'Étrange univers des Prophètes (Paris: Éditions J'ai lu, 1977).
- Gérard de Sède, La Rose-Croix (Paris: Éditions J'ai lu, 1978).
- Gérard de Sède, Saint-Émilion insolite (Saint-Émilion: Office de tourisme-syndicat d'initiative, 1980).
- Gérard de Sède, 700 ans de révoltes Occitanes (Paris: Plon, 1982). ISBN 2-259-00943-3
- Gérard de Sède, Rennes-le-Château: le dossier, les impostures, les phantasmes, les hypothèses (Paris: Robert Laffont, Les Énigmes de l'univers collection, 1988). ISBN 2-221-05522-5
- Gérard de Sède, L'Occultisme dans la Politique (with Sophie de Sède; Paris: Robert Laffont, 1994). ISBN 2-221-07561-7
- Gérard de Sède, Vues hérétiques sur l'héraldique: le blason, son écriture, son symbolisme et sa phonétique (with Sophie de Sède, Paris: Éditions Dervy, 2003). ISBN 2-84454-172-0
