= Guillaume de Gisors =

French noble

Guillaume de Gisors (1219–1307) was a Norman lord and knight. He was the son of Hugues III de Gisors and grandson of Jean de Gisors.

== Life ==
A 1256 document identifies him as the Lord of Gisors. He had fiefdom over Meulan. He received fief from Matthew II of Montmorency.

He presented a candidate for the cure of Saint-Éloi-près-Bézu to Eudes Rigaud, the Roman Catholic Archbishop of Rouen.

In conspiracy theories, such as the one promoted in The Holy Blood and the Holy Grail, Guillaume de Gisors is alleged to have been a Grand Master of the Priory of Sion.

== See also ==
- Pierre Plantard
- Rennes-le-Château
