= Gisors (surname) =

Gisors is a surname. Notable people with the surname include:

- Guillaume de Gisors (1219–1307), grandson of Jean
- Jean de Gisors (1133–1220), Norman lord of the fortress
- John de Gisors (fl. 1306–1310), English MP
