= Priory of Sion =

French fraternal organization associated with a literary hoax

The official emblem of the Priory of Sion is partly based on the fleur-de-lis, which was a symbol particularly associated with the French monarchy.

The Prieuré de Sion (French pronunciation: [pʁijœʁe də sjɔ̃]), translated as Priory of Sion, was a fraternal organisation founded and dissolved in France in 1956 by hoaxer Pierre Plantard in his failed attempt to create a prestigious neo-chivalric order. In the 1960s, Plantard began claiming that his self-styled order was the latest front for a secret society founded by crusading knight Godfrey of Bouillon, on Mount Zion in the Kingdom of Jerusalem in 1099, under the guise of the historical monastic order of the Abbey of Our Lady of Mount Zion. As a framework for his grandiose assertion of being both the Great Monarch prophesied by Nostradamus and a Merovingian pretender, Plantard further claimed the Priory of Sion was engaged in a centuries-long benevolent conspiracy to install a secret bloodline of the Merovingian dynasty on the thrones of France and the rest of Europe. To Plantard's surprise, all of his claims were fused with the notion of a Jesus bloodline and popularised by the authors of the 1982 speculative nonfiction book The Holy Blood and the Holy Grail, whose conclusions would later be borrowed by Dan Brown for his 2003 mystery thriller novel The Da Vinci Code.

After attracting varying degrees of public attention from the late 1960s to the 1980s, the mythical history of the Priory of Sion was exposed as a ludibrium — an elaborate hoax in the form of an esoteric puzzle — created by Plantard as part of his unsuccessful stratagem to become a respected, influential and wealthy player in French esotericist and monarchist circles. Pieces of evidence presented in support of the historical existence and activities of the Priory of Sion before 1956, such as the so-called Dossiers Secrets d'Henri Lobineau, were discovered to have been forged and then planted in various locations around France by Plantard and his accomplices. However, Pierre Plantard himself disowned the Dossiers Secrets when he described it as being the work of Philippe Toscan du Plantier, who had allegedly been arrested for taking LSD, in another attempt to form another version of the Priory of Sion from 1989, also reviving the organ "Vaincre", that lasted for four issues.

Despite the "Priory of Sion mysteries" having been exhaustively debunked by journalists and scholars as France's greatest 20th-century literary hoax, many conspiracy theorists still persist in believing that the Priory of Sion was a millennium-old cabal concealing a religiously subversive secret. A few independent researchers outside of academia claim, based on alleged insider information, that the Priory of Sion continues to operate as a conspiratorial secret society to this day. Some skeptics express concern that the proliferation and popularity of pseudohistorical books, websites and films inspired by the Priory of Sion hoax contribute to the problem of unfounded conspiracy theories becoming mainstream; while others are troubled by how these works romanticize the reactionary ideologies of the far right.

== History ==
The fraternal organisation was founded in the town of Annemasse, Haute-Savoie, in eastern France in 1956. The 1901 French law of Associations required that the Priory of Sion be registered with the government; although the statutes and the registration documents are dated 7 May 1956, the registration took place at the subprefecture of Saint-Julien-en-Genevois on 25 June 1956 and recorded in the Journal Officiel de la République Française on 20 July 1956. The headquarters of the Priory of Sion and its journal Circuit were based in the apartment of Plantard, in a social housing block known as Sous-Cassan newly constructed in 1956.

The founders and signatories inscribed with their real names and aliases were Pierre Plantard, also known as "Chyren", and André Bonhomme, also known as "Stanis Bellas". Bonhomme was the President while Plantard was the Secretary General. The registration documents also included the names of Jean Deleaval as the Vice-President and Armand Defago as the Treasurer. The choice of the name "Sion" was based on a popular local feature, a hill south of Annemasse in France, known as Mont Sion, where the founders intended to establish a spiritual retreat center. The accompanying title to the name was "Chevalerie d'Institutions et Règles Catholiques d'Union Indépendante et Traditionaliste": this subtitle forms the acronym CIRCUIT and translates in English as "Chivalry of Catholic Rules and Institutions of Independent and Traditionalist Union". The statutes of the Priory of Sion indicate its purpose was to allow and encourage members to engage in studies and mutual aid. The articles of the association expressed the goal of creating a Traditionalist Catholic chivalric order.

Article 7 of the statutes of the Priory of Sion stated that its members were expected "to carry out good deeds, to help the Roman Catholic Church, teach the truth, defend the weak and the oppressed". Towards the end of 1956 the association had planned to forge partnerships with the local Catholic Church of the area which would have involved a school bus service run by both the Priory of Sion and the church of Saint-Joseph in Annemasse. Plantard is described as the President of the Tenants' Association of Annemasse in the issues of Circuit. The bulk of the activities of the Priory of Sion bore no resemblance to the objectives as outlined in its statutes: Circuit, the official journal of the Priory of Sion, was indicated as a news bulletin of an "organisation for the defence of the rights and the freedom of affordable housing" rather than for the promotion of chivalry-inspired charitable work. The first issue of the journal is dated 27 May 1956, and, in total, twelve issues appeared. Some of the articles took a political position in the local council elections. Others criticised and even attacked real-estate developers of Annemasse.

According to a letter written by Léon Guersillon, the Mayor of Annemasse in 1956, contained in the folder holding the 1956 Statutes of the Priory of Sion in the subprefecture of Saint-Julien-en-Genevois, Plantard was given a six-month sentence in 1953 for fraud. The formally registered association was dissolved some time after October 1956 but intermittently revived for different reasons by Plantard between 1961 and 1993, though in name and on paper only. The Priory of Sion is considered dormant by the subprefecture because it has indicated no activities since 1956. According to French law, subsequent references to the Priory bear no legal relation to that of 1956 and no one, other than the original signatories, is entitled to use its name in an official capacity. André Bonhomme played no part in the association after 1956. He officially resigned in 1973 when he heard that Plantard was linking his name with the association. Following Plantard's death in 2000, there is no one who is currently alive who has official permission to use the name.

== Myth ==
=== Plantard's plot ===
Plantard set out to have the Priory of Sion perceived as a prestigious esoteric Christian chivalric order, whose members would be people of influence in the fields of finance, politics and philosophy, devoted to installing the "Great Monarch", prophesied by Nostradamus, on the throne of France. Plantard's choice of the pseudonym "Chyren" was a reference to "Chyren Selin", Nostradamus's anagram for the name for this eschatological figure.

Between 1961 and 1984, Plantard contrived a mythical pedigree for the Priory of Sion claiming that it was the offshoot of a real Catholic religious order housed in the Abbey of Our Lady of Mount Zion, which had been founded in the Kingdom of Jerusalem during the First Crusade in 1099 and later absorbed by the Jesuits in 1617. The mistake is often made that this Abbey of Sion was a Priory of Sion, but there is a difference between an abbey and a priory. Calling his original 1956 group "Priory of Sion" presumably gave Plantard the later idea to claim that his organisation had been historically founded by crusading knight Godfrey of Bouillon on Mount Zion near Jerusalem during the Middle Ages.

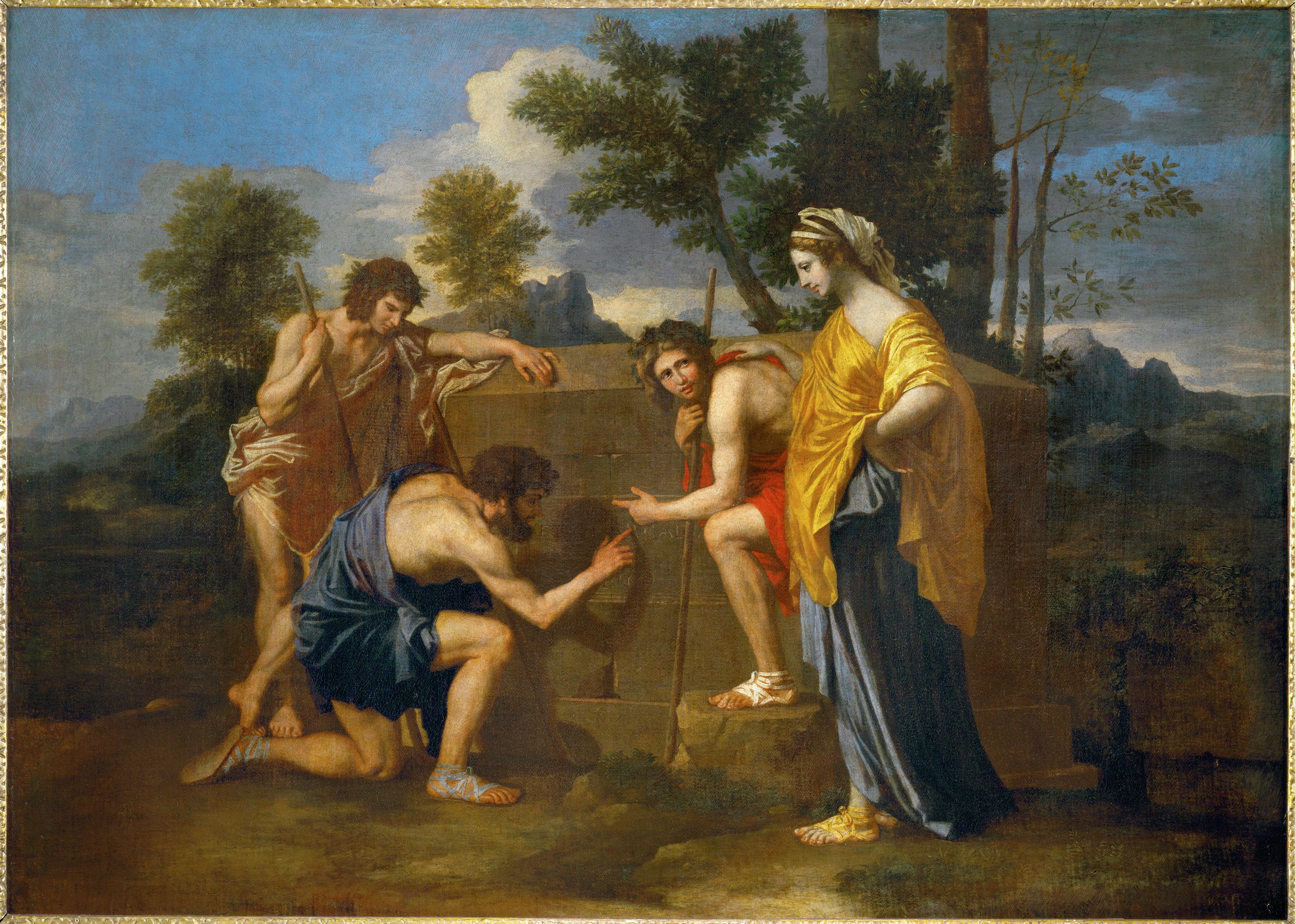
The cryptic phrase "Et in Arcadia ego" in Nicolas Poussin's late 1630s painting The Arcadian Shepherds was appropriated for Priory of Sion myth-making, first used in 1964.

Furthermore, Plantard was inspired by a 1960 magazine Les Cahiers de l'Histoire to center his personal genealogical claims, as found in the "Priory of Sion documents", on the Merovingian king Dagobert II, who had been assassinated in the 7th century. He also adopted "Et in Arcadia ego...", a slightly altered version of a Latin phrase that most famously appears as the title of two paintings by Nicolas Poussin, as the motto of both his family and the Priory of Sion, because the tomb which appears in these paintings resembled one in the Les Pontils area near Rennes-le-Château. This tomb would become a symbol for his dynastic claims as the last legacy of the Merovingians on the territory of Razès, left to remind the select few who have been initiated into these mysteries that the "lost king", Dagobert II, would figuratively come back in the form of a hereditary pretender.

To lend credibility to the apparently fabricated lineage and pedigree, Plantard and his friend, Philippe de Chérisey, needed to create "independent evidence". So during the 1960s, they created and deposited a series of false documents, the most famous of which was entitled Dossiers Secrets d'Henri Lobineau ("Secret Files of Henri Lobineau"), at the Bibliothèque nationale de France in Paris. During the same decade, Plantard commissioned de Chérisey to forge two medieval parchments. These parchments contained encrypted messages that referred to the Priory of Sion.

They adapted, and used to their advantage, the earlier false claims put forward by Noël Corbu that a Catholic priest named Bérenger Saunière had supposedly discovered ancient parchments inside a pillar while renovating his church in Rennes-le-Château in 1891. Inspired by the popularity of media reports and books in France about the discovery of the Dead Sea Scrolls in the West Bank, they hoped this same theme would attract attention to their parchments. Their version of the parchments was intended to prove Plantard's claims about the Priory of Sion being a medieval secret society that was the source of the "underground stream" of esotericism in Europe.

Plantard then enlisted the aid of author Gérard de Sède to write a book based on his unpublished manuscript and forged parchments, alleging that Saunière had discovered a link to a hidden treasure. The 1967 book L'or de Rennes, ou La vie insolite de Bérenger Saunière, curé de Rennes-le-Château ("The Gold of Rennes, or The Strange Life of Bérenger Saunière, Priest of Rennes-le-Château"), which was later published in paperback under the title Le Trésor Maudit de Rennes-le-Château ("The Accursed Treasure of Rennes-le-Château") in 1968, became a popular read in France. It included copies of the found parchments (the originals were, of course, never produced), though it did not provide the decoded hidden texts contained within them. One of the Latin texts in the parchments was copied from the Novum Testamentum, an attempted restoration of the Vulgate by John Wordsworth and Henry White.

The other text was copied from the Codex Bezae. Based on the wording used, the versions of the Latin texts found in the parchments can be shown to have been copied from books first published in 1889 and 1895, which is problematic considering that de Sède's book was trying to make a case that these documents were centuries old. In 1969, English scriptwriter, producer and researcher Henry Lincoln became intrigued after reading Le Trésor Maudit. He discovered one of the encrypted messages, which read "À Dagobert II Roi et à Sion est ce trésor, et il est là mort" ("To Dagobert II, King, and to Sion belongs this treasure and he is there dead"). This was possibly an allusion to the tomb and shrine of Sigebert IV, a real or mythical son of Dagobert II which would not only prove that the Merovingian dynasty did not end with the death of the king, but that the Priory of Sion has been entrusted with the duty to protect his relics like a treasure.

Lincoln expanded on the conspiracy theories, writing his own books on the subject, and inspiring and presenting three BBC Two Chronicle documentaries between 1972 and 1979 about the alleged mysteries of the Rennes-le-Château area. In response to a tip from Gérard de Sède, Lincoln claims he was also the one who discovered the Dossiers Secrets, a series of planted genealogies which appeared to further confirm the link with the extinct Merovingian bloodline. The documents claimed that the Priory of Sion and the Knights Templar were two fronts of one unified organisation with the same leadership until 1188.

Letters in existence dating from the 1960s written by Plantard, de Chérisey and de Sède to each other confirm that the three were engaging in an out-and-out hoax. The letters describe schemes to combat criticisms of their various allegations and ways they would make up new allegations to try to keep the hoax alive. These letters (totalling over 100) are in the possession of French researcher Jean-Luc Chaumeil, who has also retained the original envelopes. A letter later discovered at the subprefecture of Saint-Julien-en-Genevois also indicated that Plantard had a criminal conviction as a con artist.

=== The Holy Blood and the Holy Grail ===
As the Chronicle documentaries on the topic became quite popular and generated thousands of responses, Lincoln then joined forces with Michael Baigent and Richard Leigh for further research. This led them to the pseudohistorical Dossiers Secrets at the Bibliothèque nationale de France, which though alleging to portray hundreds of years of medieval history, were actually all written by Plantard and de Chérisey under the pseudonym of "Philippe Toscan du Plantier".

Unaware that the documents had been forged, Lincoln, Baigent and Leigh used them as a major source for their 1982 speculative nonfiction book The Holy Blood and the Holy Grail, in which they presented the following myths as facts to support their hypotheses:

- there is a secret society known as the Priory of Sion, which has a long history starting in 1099, and had illustrious Grand Masters including Leonardo da Vinci and Isaac Newton;
- it created the Knights Templar as its military arm and financial branch; and
- it is devoted to installing the Merovingian dynasty, that ruled the Franks from 457 to 751, on the thrones of France and the rest of Europe.

The authors re-interpreted the Dossiers Secrets in the light of their own interest in questioning the Catholic Church's institutional reading of Judeo-Christian history. Contrary to Plantard's initial Franco-Israelist claim that the Merovingians were only descended from the Tribe of Benjamin, they asserted that:

- the Priory of Sion protects Merovingian dynasts because they may be the lineal descendants of the historical Jesus and his alleged wife, Mary Magdalene, traced further back to King David;
- the legendary Holy Grail is simultaneously the womb of saint Mary Magdalene and the sacred royal bloodline she gave birth to; and
- the Church tried to kill off all remnants of this bloodline and their supposed guardians, the Cathars and the Templars, so popes could hold the episcopal throne through the apostolic succession of Peter without fear of it ever being usurped by an antipope from the hereditary succession of Mary Magdalene.

The authors therefore concluded that the modern goals of the Priory of Sion are:

- the public revelation of the tomb and shrine of Sigebert IV as well as the lost treasure of the Temple in Jerusalem, which supposedly contains genealogical records that prove the Merovingian dynasty was of the Davidic line, to facilitate Merovingian restoration in France;
- the re-institutionalization of chivalric knighthood and the promotion of pan-European nationalism;
- the establishment of a theocratic "United States of Europe": a Holy European Empire politically and religiously unified through the imperial cult of a Merovingian Great Monarch who occupies both the throne of Europe and the Holy See; and
- the actual governance of Europe residing with the Priory of Sion through a one-party European Parliament.

The authors incorporated the antisemitic and anti-Masonic tract known as The Protocols of the Elders of Zion into their story, concluding that it was actually based on the master plan of the Priory of Sion. They presented it as the most persuasive piece of evidence for the existence and activities of the Priory of Sion by arguing that:

- the original text on which the published version of The Protocols of the Elders of Zion was based had nothing to do with Judaism or an "international Jewish conspiracy". It issued from a Masonic body practicing the Scottish Rite which incorporated the word "Zion" in its name;
- the original text was not intended to be released publicly, but was a program for gaining control of Freemasonry as part of a strategy to infiltrate and reorganize church and state according to esoteric Christian principles;
- after a failed attempt to gain influence in the court of Tsar Nicholas II of Russia, Sergei Nilus changed the original text to forge an inflammatory tract in 1903 to discredit the esoteric clique around Papus by implying they were Judaeo-Masonic conspirators; and
- some esoteric Christian elements in the original text were ignored by Nilus and hence remained unchanged in the antisemitic canard he published.

In reaction to this memetic synthesis of investigative journalism with religious conspiracism, many secular conspiracy theorists added the Priory of Sion to their list of secret societies collaborating or competing to manipulate political happenings from behind the scenes in their bid for world domination. Some occultists speculated that the emergence of the Priory of Sion and Plantard closely follows The Prophecies by M. Michel Nostradamus (unaware that Plantard was intentionally trying to fulfill them). Fringe Christian eschatologists countered that it was a fulfilment of prophecies found in the Book of Revelation and further proof of an anti-Christian conspiracy of epic proportions.

Historians and scholars from related fields do not accept The Holy Blood and the Holy Grail as a serious dissertation. French authors like Franck Marie (1978), Pierre Jarnac (1985), (1988), Jean-Luc Chaumeil (1994), and more recently Marie-France Etchegoin and Frédéric Lenoir (2004), Massimo Introvigne (2005), Jean-Jacques Bedu (2005), and Bernardo Sanchez Da Motta (2005), have never taken Plantard and the Priory of Sion as seriously as Lincoln, Baigent and Leigh. They eventually concluded that it was all a hoax, outlining in detail the reasons for their verdict, and giving detailed evidence that the Holy Blood authors had not reported comprehensively. They imply that this evidence had been ignored by Lincoln, Baigent, and Leigh to bolster the mythical version of the Priory's history that was developed by Plantard during the early 1960s after meeting author Gérard de Sède.

=== The Messianic Legacy ===
In 1986, Lincoln, Baigent and Leigh published The Messianic Legacy, a sequel to The Holy Blood and the Holy Grail. The authors assert that the Priory of Sion is not only the archetypal cabal but an ideal repository of the cultural legacy of Jewish messianism that could end the "crisis of meaning" within the Western world by providing a Merovingian sacred king as a messianic figure in which the West and, by extension, humanity can place its trust. However, the authors are led to believe by Plantard that he had resigned as Grand Master of the Priory of Sion in 1984 and that the organisation has since gone underground in reaction to both an internal power struggle between Plantard and an "Anglo-American contingent" as well as a campaign of character assassination against Plantard in the press and books written by skeptics.

Although Lincoln, Baigent and Leigh remain convinced that the pre-1956 history of the Priory of Sion is true, they confess to the possibility that all of Plantard's claims about a post-1956 Priory of Sion were part of an elaborate hoax to become a respected, influential and wealthy player in French esotericist and monarchist circles.

=== Revised myth ===
In 1989, Plantard tried but failed to salvage his reputation and agenda as a mystagogue in esotericist circles by claiming that the Priory of Sion had actually been founded in 1681 at Rennes-le-Château, and was focused more on harnessing the paranormal power of ley lines and sunrise lines, and a promontory called "Roc Noir" (Black Rock) in the area, than installing a Merovingian pretender on the restored throne of France. In 1990, Plantard revised himself by claiming he was only descended from a cadet branch of the line of Dagobert II, while arguing that the direct descendant was really Otto von Habsburg.

=== Pelat Affair ===
In September 1993, while investigative judge Thierry Jean-Pierre was investigating the activities of multi-millionaire Roger-Patrice Pelat in the context of the Pechiney-Triangle Affair, he was informed that Pelat may have once been Grand Master of a secret society known as the Priory of Sion. Pelat's name had been on Plantard's list of Grand Masters since 1989. In fact, Pelat had died in 1989, while he was being indicted for insider trading. Following a long established pattern of using dead people's names, Plantard "recruited" the "initiate" Pelat soon after his death and included him as the most recent Priory of Sion Grand Master. Plantard had first claimed that Pelat had been a Grand Master in a Priory of Sion pamphlet dated 8 March 1989, then claimed it again later in a 1990 issue of Vaincre, the revived publication of Alpha Galates, a pseudo-chivalric order created by Plantard in Vichy France to support the "National Revolution".

Pelat had been a friend of François Mitterrand, then President of France, and at the centre of a scandal involving French Prime Minister Pierre Bérégovoy. As an investigative judge, Jean-Pierre could not dismiss any information brought to his attention pertaining to the case, especially if it might have led to a scandal similar to the one implicating an illegal Masonic lodge named Propaganda Due in the 1982 Banco Ambrosiano bank failure in Italy, Jean-Pierre ordered a search of Plantard's home. The search turned up a hoard of false documents, including some proclaiming Plantard the true king of France. Plantard admitted under oath that he had fabricated everything, including Pelat's involvement with the Priory of Sion. Plantard was threatened with legal action by the Pelat family and therefore disappeared to his house in southern France. He was 74 years old at the time. Nothing more was heard of him until he died in Paris on 3 February 2000.

=== Revival attempts ===
On 27 December 2002, an open letter announced the revival of the Priory of Sion as an integral traditionalist esoteric society, which stated that: "The Commanderies of Saint-Denis, Millau, Geneva and Barcelona are fully operative. According to the Tradition, the first Commanderie is under the direction of a woman", claiming there were 9,841 members. It was signed by Gino Sandri (who claims to be Plantard's former private secretary) under the title of General Secretary, and by "P. Plantard" (Le Nautonnier, G. Chyren). Sandri is a well-versed occultist who has spent his life infiltrating esoteric societies only to get expelled from them. After interviewing Sandri, independent researcher Laurent Octonovo Buchholtzer wrote:

I’ve personally met this Gino Sandri on one occasion, and I had the opportunity to have a really good talk with him, but I think that he's simply seeking attention. He seemed to me to be something of a mythomaniac, which would certainly be an excellent qualification for being Secretary of the Priory of Sion. During our conversation he said something in passing that I found quite extraordinary. He said, "Ultimately, what is the Priory of Sion? It's nothing more than a well-known brand name, but with goodness knows what behind it?" He gave a good brief account of the phenomenon of the Priory of Sion. Thanks to Dan Brown, hundreds of millions of people now have "brand awareness", and several million of them seem to take it seriously.

Since 2016, Italian esotericist Marco Rigamonti has claimed to be the Grand Master of the Priory of Sion.

=== The Da Vinci Code ===
As a result of Dan Brown's best-selling 2003 conspiracy fiction novel The Da Vinci Code and the subsequent 2006 film, there was a new level of public interest in the Priory of Sion. Brown's novel promotes the mythical version of the Priory but departs from the ultimate conclusions presented in The Holy Blood and the Holy Grail. Rather than plotting to create a Federal Europe ruled by a Merovingian sacred king descended from the historical Jesus, the Priory of Sion initiates its members into a mystery cult seeking to restore the feminist theology necessary for a complete understanding of early Christianity, which was supposedly suppressed by the Catholic Church. The author has presented this speculation as fact in his non-fiction preface, as well as in his public appearances and interviews.

Furthermore, in their 1987 sequel The Messianic Legacy, Lincoln, Baigent and Leigh suggested that there was a current conflict between the Priory of Sion and the Sovereign Military Order of Malta, which they speculated might have originated from an earlier rivalry between the Knights Templar and Knights Hospitaller during the Crusades. However, for the dramatic structure of The Da Vinci Code, Brown chose the controversial Catholic personal prelature Opus Dei as the Assassini-like nemesis of the Priory of Sion, despite the fact that no author had ever argued that there is a conflict between these two groups.

=== The Sion Revelation ===
Further conspiracy theories were reported in the 2006 non-fiction book The Sion Revelation: The Truth About the Guardians of Christ's Sacred Bloodline by Lynn Picknett and Clive Prince (authors of the 1997 non-fiction book The Templar Revelation, the principal source for Dan Brown's claims about hidden messages in the work of Leonardo da Vinci). They accepted that the pre-1956 history of the Priory of Sion was a hoax created by Plantard, and that his claim that he was a Merovingian dynast was a lie. However, they insist that this was part of a complex red herring intended to distract the public from the hidden agenda of Plantard and his "controllers". They argue that the Priory of Sion was a front organisation for one of the many crypto-political societies which have been plotting to create a "United States of Europe" in line with French occultist Alexandre Saint-Yves d'Alveydre's synarchist vision of an ideal form of government.

=== Bloodline movie ===
The 2008 documentary Bloodline by 1244 Films and producers Bruce Burgess, a British filmmaker with an interest in paranormal claims and Rene Barnett, a Los Angeles researcher and television and filmmaker, expands on the "Jesus bloodline" hypothesis and other elements of The Holy Blood and the Holy Grail. Accepting as valid the testimony of an amateur archaeologist codenamed "Ben Hammott" relating to his discoveries made in the vicinity of Rennes-le-Château since 1999, the film speculates that Ben has found the treasure of Bérenger Saunière: a mummified corpse, which Hammott claimed to believe is Mary Magdalene, in an underground tomb purportedly connected to both the Knights Templar and the Priory of Sion. In the film, Burgess interviews several people with alleged connections to the Priory of Sion, including a Gino Sandri and Nicolas Haywood. A book by one of the documentary's researchers, Rob Howells, entitled Inside the Priory of Sion: Revelations from the World's Most Secret Society – Guardians of the Bloodline of Jesus presented the version of the Priory of Sion as given in the 2008 documentary, which contained several erroneous assertions, such as the claim that Plantard believed in the Jesus bloodline hypothesis. On 21 March 2012, ahead of an impending public outing on the internet, Ben Hammott confessed and apologised on NightVision Radio, a podcast hosted by Bloodline Producer Rene Barnett (using his real name Bill Wilkinson) that everything to do with the tomb and related artifacts was a hoax; revealing that the actual tomb was now destroyed, being part of a full sized set located in a warehouse in England.

== Alleged Grand Masters ==
The notional version of the Priory of Sion first referred to during the 1960s was supposedly led by a "Nautonnier", an Old French word for a navigator, which means Grand Master in their internal esoteric nomenclature. The following list of Grand Masters is derived from the Dossiers Secrets d'Henri Lobineau compiled by Plantard under the nom de plume of "Philippe Toscan du Plantier" in 1967. All those named on this list had died before that date. All but two are also found on lists of alleged "Imperators" (supreme heads) and "distinguished members" of the Ancient Mystical Order Rosae Crucis that circulated in France at the time when Plantard was in touch with this Rosicrucian Order. Most of those named share the common thread of being known for having an interest in the occult or heresy.

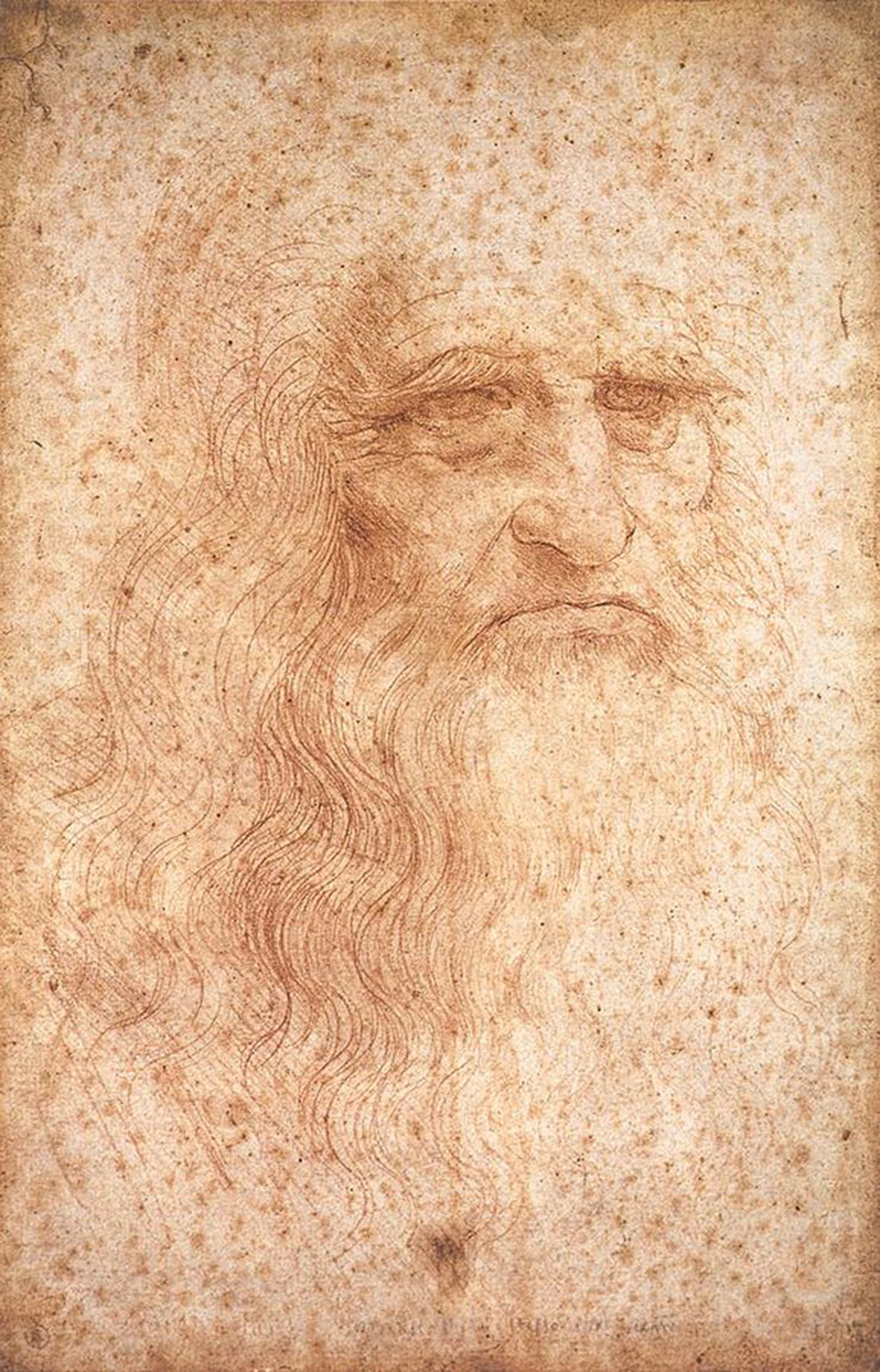
Leonardo da Vinci, alleged to be the Priory of Sion's 12th Grand Master

The Dossiers Secrets asserted that the Priory of Sion and the Knights Templar always shared the same Grand Master until a schism occurred during the "Cutting of the elm" incident in 1188. Following that event, the Grand Masters of the Priory of Sion are listed in French as being:

1. Jean de Gisors (1188–1220)
2. Marie de Saint-Clair (1220–1266)- Marie de Saint-Clair (1192–1266), daughter of Robert de Saint-Clair and Isabel Levis, became Grand Mistress of the Priory from 1220 to her death (3).
3. Guillaume de Gisors (1266–1307)
4. Edouard de Bar (1307–1336)
5. Jeanne de Bar (1336–1351)
6. Jean de Saint-Clair (1351–1366)
7. Blanche d'Évreux (1366–1398)
8. Nicolas Flamel (1398–1418)
9. René d'Anjou (1418–1480)
10. Iolande de Bar (1480–1483)
11. Sandro Botticelli (1483–1510)
12. Leonardo da Vinci (1510–1519)
13. Connétable de Bourbon (1519–1527)
14. Ferrante I Gonzaga (1527–1575)
15. Ludovico Gonzaga (1575–1595)
16. Robert Fludd (1595–1637)
17. J. Valentin Andrea (1637–1654)
18. Robert Boyle (1654–1691)
19. Isaac Newton (1691–1727)
20. Charles Radclyffe (1727–1746)
21. Charles de Lorraine (1746–1780)
22. Maximilian de Lorraine (1780–1801)
23. Charles Nodier (1801–1844)
24. Victor Hugo (1844–1885)
25. Claude Debussy (1885–1918)
26. Jean Cocteau (1918–1963)

A later document, Le Cercle d'Ulysse, identifies François Ducaud-Bourget, a prominent Traditionalist Catholic priest who Plantard had worked for as a sexton during World War II, as the Grand Master following Cocteau's death. Plantard himself is later identified as the next Grand Master.

Pierre Plantard rejected the Dossiers Secrets from the late 1980s and gave the Priory of Sion a completely different pedigree. For example the link with the Knights Templar was abolished, although the connection with Godfrey of Bouillon remained. Plantard attempted to make a comeback. The second list appeared in Vaincre No. 3, September 1989, p. 22 which included the names of the deceased Roger-Patrice Pelat, and his own son Thomas Plantard de Saint-Clair:

1. Jean-Tim Negri d'Albes (1681–1703)
2. François d'Hautpoul (1703–1726)
3. André-Hercule de Fleury (1726–1766)
4. Charles de Lorraine (1766–1780)
5. Maximilian de Lorraine (1780–1801)
6. Charles Nodier (1801–1844)
7. Victor Hugo (1844–1885)
8. Claude Debussy (1885–1918)
9. Jean Cocteau (1918–1963)
10. François Balphangon (1963–1969)
11. John Drick (1969–1981)
12. Pierre Plantard de Saint-Clair (1981)
13. Philippe de Chérisey (1984–1985)
14. Roger-Patrice Pelat (1985–1989)
15. Pierre Plantard de Saint-Clair (1989)
16. Thomas Plantard de Saint-Clair (1989)
