= Jesus bloodline =

Hypothetical sequence of lineal descendants of the historical Jesus

The Jesus bloodline refers to the proposition that a lineal sequence of the historical Jesus has persisted, possibly to the present time. Although absent from the Gospels or historical records, the concept of Jesus having descendants has gained a presence in the public imagination, as seen with Dan Brown's 2003 best-selling novel The Da Vinci Code and its 2006 movie adaptation of the same name that used the premise for its plot. It is dismissed generally by scholars. These claimed Jesus's bloodlines are distinct from the biblical genealogy of Jesus, which concerns the ancestors of Jesus, and from the alleged Brothers of Jesus and other kin of Jesus, known as the Desposyni.

== Jesus as husband and father ==
=== Historical precursors ===
Ideas that Jesus Christ might have been married have a long history in fringe Christian theology, though the historical record says nothing concerning the subject. Bart D. Ehrman, chairperson of the Department of Religious Studies at the University of North Carolina, commented that, although there are some historical scholars who claim that it is likely that Jesus was married, the vast majority of New Testament and early Christianity scholars find such a claim to be historically unreliable.

Much of the literature of this type has a more specific emphasis, on a claimed marriage between Jesus and Mary Magdalene. There are indications in Gnosticism of the belief that Jesus and Mary Magdalene shared an amorous, and not just a religious relationship. The Gnostic Gospel of Philip tells that Jesus "kissed her often" and refers to Mary as his "companion". Several sources from the 13th-century claim that an aspect of Catharist theology was the belief that the earthly Jesus had a familial relationship with Mary Magdalene. An Exposure of the Albigensian and Waldensian Heresies, dated to before 1213 and usually attributed to Ermengaud of Béziers, a former Waldensian seeking reconciliation with the Catholic Church, would describe Cathar heretical beliefs including the claim that they taught "in the secret meetings that Mary Magdalen was the wife of Christ". A second work, untitled and anonymous, repeats Ermengaud's claim. The anti-heretic polemic Historia Albigensis, written between 1212 and 1218 by Cistercian monk and chronicler Peter of Vaux de Cernay, gives the most lurid description, attributing to Cathars the belief that Mary Magdalene was the concubine of Jesus. These sources must be considered with caution: the two known authors were not themselves Cathars and were writing of a heresy being actively and violently suppressed. There is no evidence that these beliefs derived from the much earlier Gnostic traditions of Jesus and Mary Magdalene, but the Cathar traditions did find their way into many of the 20th-century popular writings claiming the existence of a progeny of Jesus.

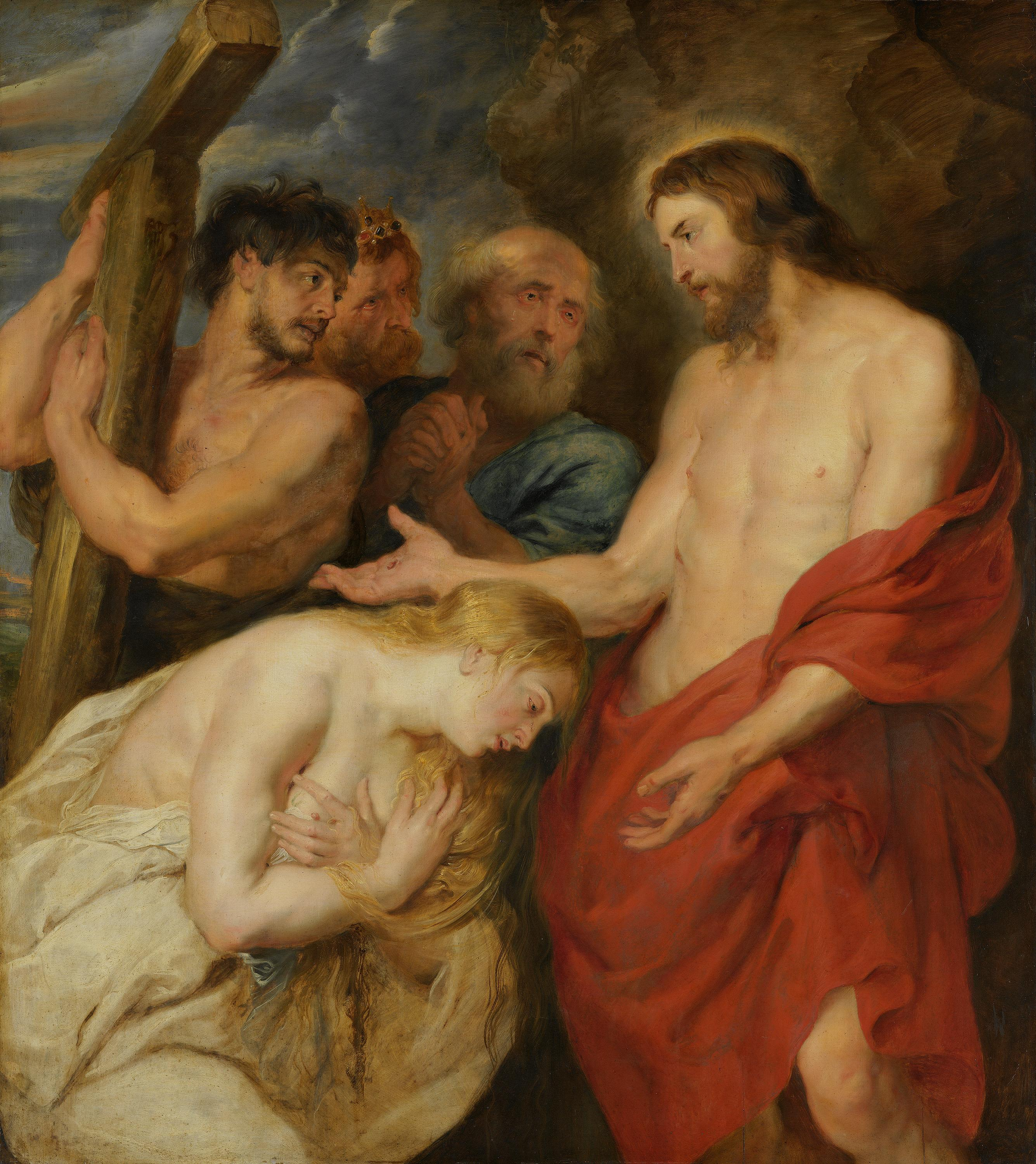
Christ and Mary Magdalene (Peter Paul Rubens, 1618)

=== Modern works ===
Produced during the late 19th-century were the first of several expansions of this theme of marriage between Jesus and Mary Magdalene, providing the couple with a named child. The French socialist politician, Louis Martin (pseudonym of Léon Aubry, died 1900), in his 1886 book Les Evangiles sans Dieu (The Gospels without God), republished the next year in his Essai sur la vie de Jésus (Essay on the life of Jesus), described the historical Jesus as a socialist and atheist. He related that after his crucifixion, Mary Magdalene, along with the family of Lazarus of Bethany, brought the body of Jesus to Provence, and there Mary had a child, Maximin, the fruit of her love for Jesus. The scenario was dismissed as 'certainly strange' by a contemporary reviewer.

During the late 20th century there was a flourishing of a genre of popular books claiming that Jesus married Mary Magdalene and had a family. Donovan Joyce's 1972 best-seller, The Jesus Scroll, presented an alternative timeline for Jesus that purportedly originated from a mysterious document. He claimed that, after being denied access to the Masada archaeological site, he was met at the Tel Aviv airport by an American University professor using the pseudonym "Max Grosset", who held a large scroll he claimed to have smuggled from the site. Relating its contents to Joyce, Grosset offered to pay him to smuggle it out of the country, but then became spooked when his flight was delayed and snuck away; he was never identified and the scroll was not known of again. According to Joyce, the 'Jesus Scroll' was a personal letter by 80-year-old Yeshua ben Ya’akob ben Gennesareth, heir of the Hasmonean dynasty and hence rightful King of Israel, written on the eve of the capture of the city by the Romans after a suicide pact ended Masada's resistance. It was said to have described the man as married, and that he had a son whose crucifixion the letter's author had witnessed. Joyce identified the writer with Jesus of Nazareth, who, he claimed, had survived his own crucifixion to marry and settle at Masada, and suggested a conspiracy to hide the contents of the Dead Sea Scrolls in order to suppress this counter-narrative to Christian orthodoxy.

Barbara Thiering, in her 1992 book Jesus and the Riddle of the Dead Sea Scrolls: Unlocking the Secrets of His Life Story, republished as Jesus the Man and made into a documentary, The Riddle of the Dead Sea Scrolls, by the Australian Broadcasting Corporation, also developed a Jesus and Mary Magdalene familial scenario. Thiering based her historical conclusions on her application of what she calls the Pesher technique (interpretation based on ancient commentaries) to the New Testament. Thiering dates the betrothal of Jesus and Mary Magdalene precisely to 30 June, AD 30, at 10:00 p.m. She relocated the events in the life of Jesus from Bethlehem, Nazareth and Jerusalem to Qumran, and related that Jesus was revived after an incomplete crucifixion and married Mary Magdalene, who was already pregnant by him, that they had a daughter Tamar and a son Jesus Justus born in AD 41, and Jesus then divorced Mary to wed a Jewess named Lydia, going to Rome where he died. The account was dismissed as fanciful by scholar Michael J. McClymond.

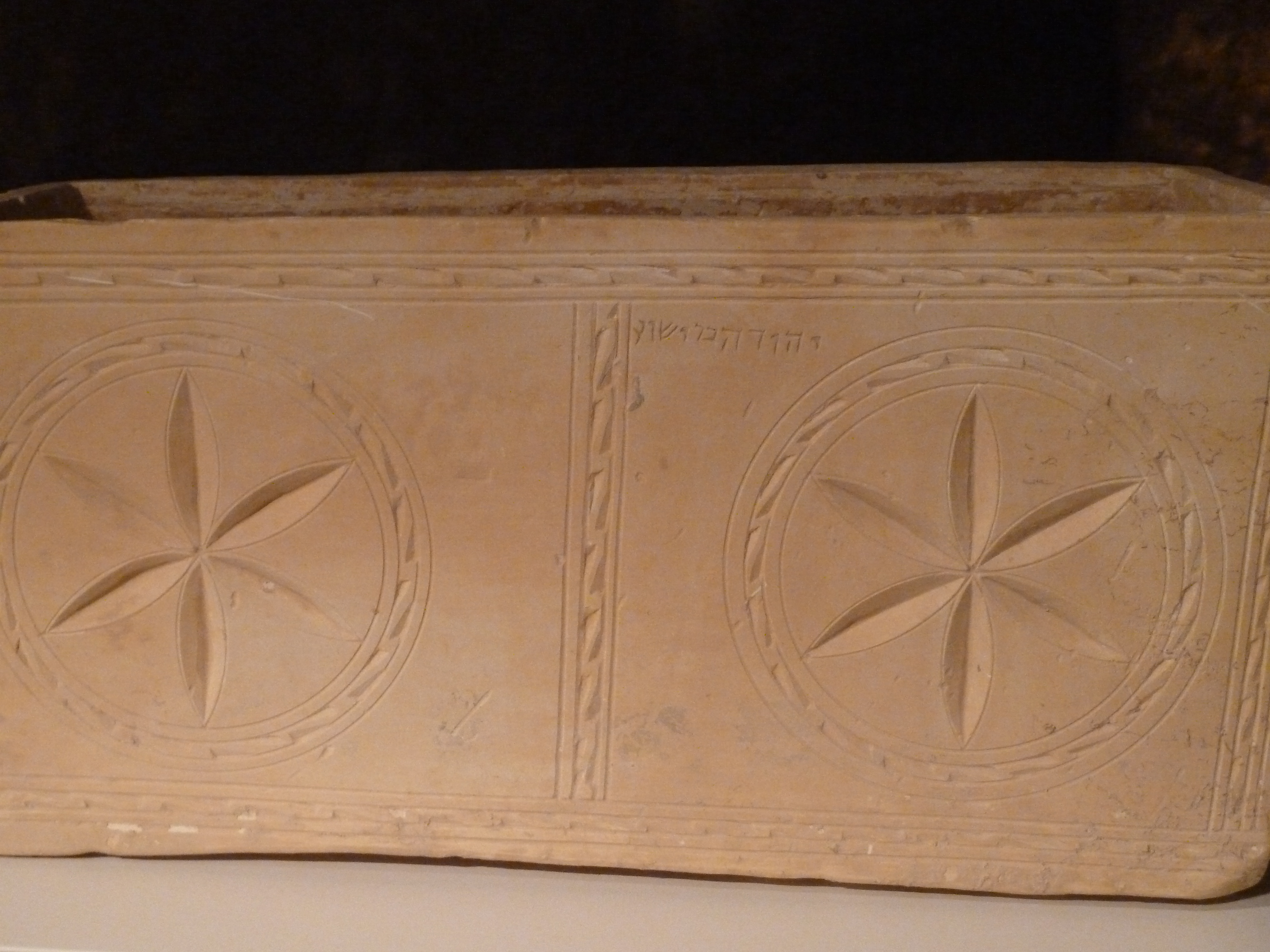
Ossuary of 'Yehuda bar Yeshua' (Judah son of Jesus), from the Talpiot Tomb. The Israel Museum, Jerusalem.

In the television documentary, The Lost Tomb of Jesus, and book The Jesus Family Tomb, both from 2007, fringe investigative journalist Simcha Jacobovici and Charles R. Pellegrino proposed that ossuaries in the Talpiot Tomb, discovered in Jerusalem in 1980, belonged to Jesus and his family. Jacobovici and Pellegrino argue that Aramaic inscriptions reading "Judah, son of Jesus", "Jesus, son of Joseph", and "Mariamne", a name they associate with Mary Magdalene, together preserve the record of a family group consisting of Jesus, his wife Mary Magdalene and son Judah. Such theory has been rejected by the overwhelming majority of biblical scholars, archaeologists and theologians, including the archaeologist Amos Kloner, who managed the archeological excavation of the tomb itself.

During the same year a book was published with a similar theme that Jesus and Mary Magdalene produced a family, authored by psychic medium and best-selling author Sylvia Browne, The Two Marys: The Hidden History of the Mother and Wife of Jesus.

The Jesus Seminar, a group of scholars involved in the quest for the historical Jesus, were unable to determine whether Jesus and Mary Magdalene had a matrimonial relationship due to the dearth of historical evidence. They concluded that the historical Mary Magdalene was not a repentant prostitute but a prominent disciple of Jesus and authority in the early Christian community. The claims that Jesus and Mary Magdalene fled to France parallel other legends about the flight of disciples to distant lands, such as the one depicting Joseph of Arimathea traveling to England after the death of Jesus, taking with him a piece of thorn from the Crown of Thorns, which he later planted in Glastonbury. Historians generally regard these legends as "pious frauds" produced during the Middle Ages.

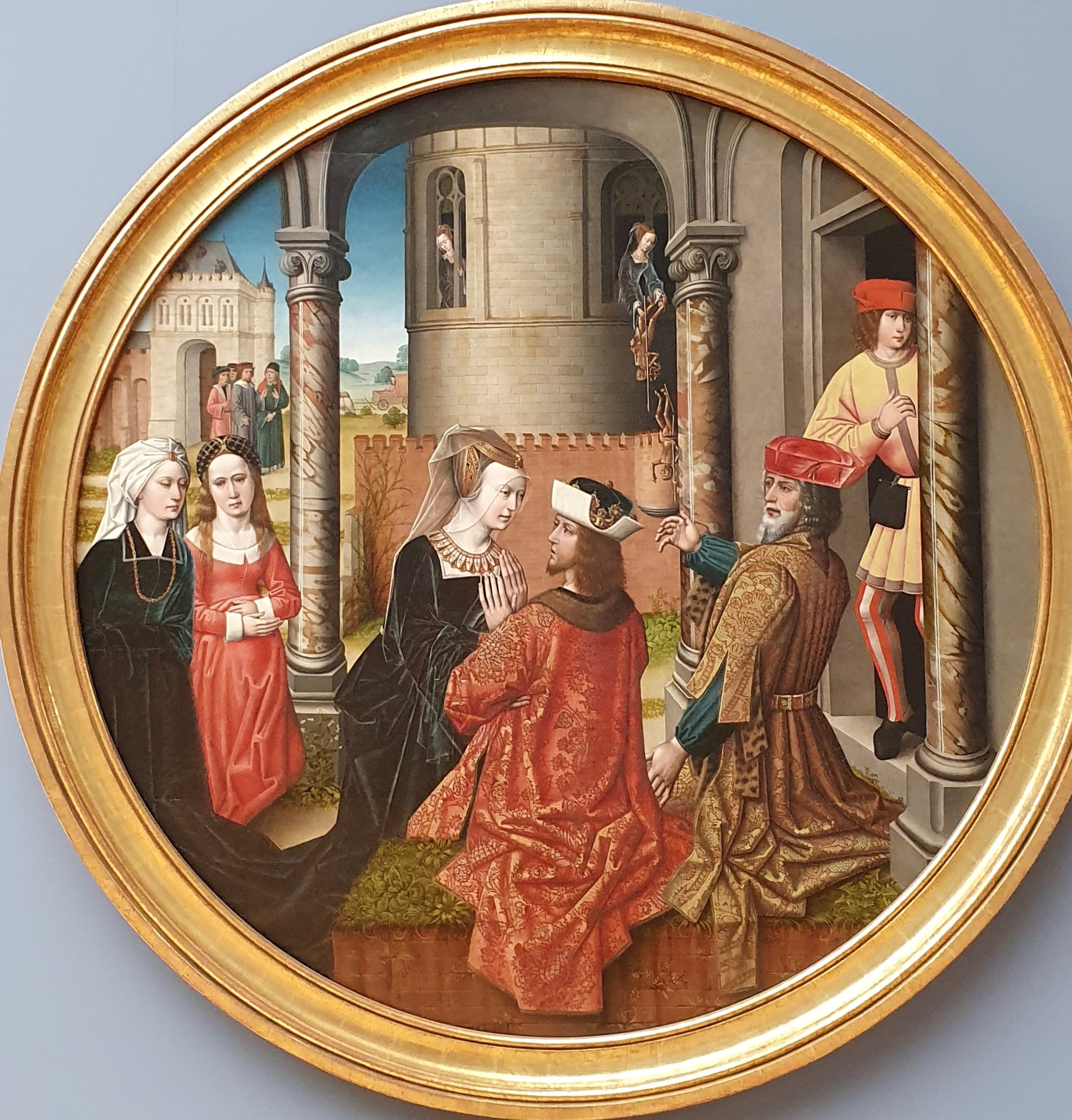
Joseph meets Asenath (1490/1500)

=== Joseph and Aseneth ===
In 2014, Simcha Jacobovici and fringe religious studies historian Barrie Wilson suggested in The Lost Gospel that the eponymous characters of a 6th-century tale called "Joseph and Aseneth" were in actuality representations of Jesus and Mary Magdalene. The story was reported in an anthology compiled by Pseudo-Zacharias Rhetor, along with covering letters describing the discovery of the original Greek manuscript and its translation into Syriac. In one of these, translator Moses of Ingila explained the story "as an allegory of Christ's marriage to the soul". Jacobovici and Wilson instead interpret it as an allegorical reference to an actual marriage of Jesus, produced by a community believing that he was married and had children.

Israeli Biblical scholar, Rivka Nir termed their work "serious-minded, thought-provoking and interesting", but described the thesis as objectionable, and the book has been dismissed by mainstream Biblical scholarship, for example by Anglican theologian, Richard Bauckham. The Church of England compared The Lost Gospel to a Monty Python sketch, the director of communications for the Archbishop's Council citing the book as an example of religious illiteracy and that ever since the publication of The Da Vinci Code in 2003, "an industry had been constructed in which 'conspiracy theorists, satellite channel documentaries and opportunistic publishers had identified a lucrative income stream'." The Lost Gospel was described as historical nonsense by Markus Bockmuehl.

=== Early Mormon theology ===
Early Mormon theology posited not only that Jesus married, but that he did so multiple times. Early Mormon officials Jedediah M. Grant, Orson Hyde, Joseph F. Smith and Orson Pratt stated it was part of their religious belief that Jesus Christ was polygamous, quoting this in their respective sermons. A number of the early church officials claimed to be the lineal descendants of Jesus by such a marriage. The Mormons also used an apocryphal passage attributed to the 2nd-century Greek philosopher Celsus: "The grand reason why the gentiles and philosophers of his school persecuted Jesus Christ was because he had so many wives. There were Elizabeth and Mary and a host of others that followed him". This seems to have been a summary of a garbled or second-hand reference to a quote from Celsus preserved in the apologetics work Contra Celsum ("Against Celsus") by the Church Father Origen: "such was the charm of Jesus's words, that not only were men willing to follow Him to the wilderness, but women also, forgetting the weakness of their sex and a regard for outward propriety in thus following their Teacher into desert places."

== Jesus as ancestor of a progeny ==
Michael Baigent, Richard Leigh, and Henry Lincoln developed and popularized the idea of a progeny descended from Jesus and Mary Magdalene in their 1982 book The Holy Blood and the Holy Grail (published as Holy Blood, Holy Grail in the United States), in which they asserted: "... we do not think the Incarnation truly symbolises what it is intended to symbolise unless Jesus were married and sired children". Specifically, they claimed that the sangraal of medieval lore did not represent the San Graal (Holy Grail), the cup drunk from at the Last Supper, but both the vessel of Mary Magdalene's womb and the Sang Real, the blood royal of Jesus represented in a lineage descended from them. In their reconstruction, Mary Magdalene goes to France after the crucifixion, carrying a child by Jesus who would originate a lineage that centuries later would unite with the Merovingian rulers of the early Frankish kingdom, from whom they trace the descent into medieval dynasties that were almost exterminated by the Albigensian Crusade against the Cathars, leaving a small remnant protected by a secret society, the Priory of Sion. The role of the Priory was inspired by earlier writings primarily by Pierre Plantard, who in the 1960s and 1970s had publicized documents from the secretive Priory that demonstrated its long history and his own descent from the lineage they had protected that traced to the Merovingian kings, and earlier, the biblical Tribe of Benjamin. Plantard would dismiss Holy Blood as fiction in a 1982 radio interview, as did his collaborator Philippe de Cherisey in a magazine article, but a decade later Plantard admitted that, before he incorporated a group of that name in the 1950s, the very existence of the Priory had been an elaborate hoax, and that the documents on which Baigent, Leigh and Lincoln had relied for inspiration had been forgeries planted in French institutions to be later "rediscovered". The actual lineage claimed for the portion of the Plantard and Holy Blood bloodline that passes through the medieval era received very negative reviews in the genealogical literature, being considered as consisting of numerous inaccurate associations that were unsupported, or even directly contradicted, by the authentic historical record.

The Woman with the Alabaster Jar: Mary Magdalen and the Holy Grail, a 1993 book by Margaret Starbird, built on Cathar beliefs and Provencal traditions of Saint Sarah, the black servant of Mary Magdalene, to develop the hypothesis that Sarah was the daughter of Jesus and Mary Magdalene. In her reconstruction, a pregnant Mary Magdalene fled first to Egypt and then France after the crucifixion. She considers this as the source of the legend associated with the cult at Saintes-Maries-de-la-Mer. She also noted that the name "Sarah" means "Princess" in Hebrew, thus making her the forgotten child of the "sang réal", the blood royal of the King of the Jews. Starbird also considered Mary Magdalene as identical with Mary of Bethany, sister of Lazarus. Though working with the same claimed relationship between Jesus, Mary Magdalene and Saint Sarah that would have a major role in many of the published progeny scenarios, Starbird considered any question of descent from Sarah to be irrelevant to her thesis, though she accepted that it existed. Her opinion of Mary Magdalene/Mary of Bethany as wife of Jesus is also associated with the concept of the sacred feminine in feminist theology. Mary Ann Beavis stated that unlike others in the genre, Starbird actively courted scholarly engagement concerning her ideas, and that "[a]lthough her methods, arguments and conclusions do not always stand up to scholarly scrutiny, some of her exegetical insights merit attention . . .," while suggesting she is more mythographer than historian.

In his 1996 book Bloodline of the Holy Grail: The Hidden Lineage of Jesus Revealed, Laurence Gardner presented pedigree charts of Jesus and Mary Magdalene as the ancestors of all the European royal families of the Common Era. His 2000 sequel Genesis of the Grail Kings: The Explosive Story of Genetic Cloning and the Ancient Bloodline of Jesus is unique in claiming that not only can the Jesus bloodline truly be traced back to Adam and Eve but that the first man and woman were primate-alien hybrids created by the Anunnaki of his ancient astronaut theory. Gardner followed this book with several additional works in the bloodline genre.

In Rex Deus: The True Mystery of Rennes-Le-Chateau and the Dynasty of Jesus, published in 2000, Marylin Hopkins, Graham Simmans and Tim Wallace-Murphy developed a similar scenario based on 1994 testimony by the pseudonymous "Michael Monkton", that a Jesus and Mary Magdalene progeny was part of a shadow dynasty descended from twenty-four high priests of the Temple in Jerusalem known as Rex Deus – the "Kings of God". The evidence on which the informant based his claim to be a Rex Deus scion, descended from Hugues de Payens, was said to be lost and therefore cannot be verified independently, because 'Michael' claimed that it was kept in his late father's bureau, which was sold by his brother unaware of its contents. Some critics state that the informant's account of his family history seems to be based on the controversial work of Barbara Thiering.

=== The Da Vinci Code ===
The best-known work depicting a progeny of Jesus is the 2003 best-selling novel and global phenomenon, The Da Vinci Code, joined by its 2006 major cinematic release of the same name. In these, Dan Brown incorporated many of the earlier progeny themes as the background for his work of conspiracy fiction. The author attested both in the text and public interviews to the veracity of the progeny details that served as the novel's historical context. The work became so well known that the Catholic Church felt compelled to warn its congregates against accepting its pseudo-historical background as fact, which did not stop it from becoming the eleventh highest-selling novel in American history, with tens of millions of copies sold worldwide. Brown mixes facts easily verified by the reader, seemingly-authentic details that are not actually factual, and outright conjecture. An indication of the degree to which the work became popular is given by the numerous imitations that it inspired, replicating his style and thesis or attempting to refute it.

In Brown's novel, the protagonist discovers that the grail actually referred to Mary Magdalene, and that knowledge of this, as well as of the progeny descended from Jesus and Mary, has been kept hidden to the present time by a secret conspiracy. This is very similar to the thesis by Baigent, Leigh and Lincoln in Holy Blood and the Holy Grail though not associating the hidden knowledge with the Cathars, and Brown also incorporated material from Joyce, Thiering and Starbird, as well as the 1965 The Passover Plot, in which Hugh J. Schonfield claimed that Lazarus and Joseph of Arimathea had faked the resurrection after Jesus was killed by mistake when stabbed by a Roman soldier. Still, Brown relied so much on Holy Blood that two of its authors, Baigent and Leigh, sued the book's publisher, Random House, due to what they considered to be plagiarism. Brown had made no secret that the progeny material in his work drew largely on Holy Blood, directly citing the work in his book and naming the novel's historical expert after Baigent (in anagram form) and Leigh, but Random House argued that since Baigent and Leigh had presented their ideas as non-fiction, consisting of historical facts, however speculative, then Brown was free to reproduce these concepts just as other works of historical fiction treat historical events. Baigent and Leigh argued that Brown had done more, "appropriat[ing] the architecture" of their work, and thus had "hijacked" and "exploited" it. Though one judge questioned whether the supposedly-factual Holy Blood truly represented fact, or instead bordered on fiction due to its highly conjectural nature, courts ruled in favor of Random House and Brown.

=== Dynasty of the Holy Grail ===
A presentation of analogous concepts in a Mormon context was published in 2006: Dynasty of the Holy Grail: Mormonism's Sacred Bloodline by art historian Vern Grosvenor Swanson. Formatted as a footnoted scholarly study and claiming to be the culmination of almost three decades of research, the work was produced partly as a response to "a fuzzy gnostic, leftwing, liberal, and adamantly feminist bias" regarding the divine feminine and sacred marriage that pervaded recent literature concerning the subject, and that the author considered as "ideologically corrosive to faith in Jesus Christ". He nonetheless drew from the same pseudohistorical grail legend as Holy Blood, combining it with concepts related to British Israelism, beliefs of the early Mormon fathers, and modern genetic genealogy.

Swanson presents a Jesus who was the son of an English- or Irish-born Mary, and who visited England to study Druidism before wedding Mary Magdalene. After Jesus's death, Swanson portrays his widow as taking her children by Jesus, whom he refers to as the 'Shiloh Dynasty', to England, and that one of these became a male-line ancestor of Joseph Smith, to whom the author also attributes a matrilineal derivation from the same Shiloh Dynasty. He claims that in uniting patrilineal and matrilineal descents from the marriage of Jesus and Mary Magdalene, a marriage that itself, according to Swanson, healed a longstanding breach between the houses of Judah and Ephraim, Joseph Smith was not only a prophet but the 'Davidic king of all Israel', and that all of the Mormon presidents and major officials were members of this lineage either by birth or ritual adoption. Reviewers found aspects of his argument problematic, particularly his utter rejection of the work of Baigent, Leigh and Lincoln as authentic history, while at the same time using their work as a basis for the 'Holy Grail' portion of his own reconstruction.

=== Bloodline, 2008 documentary ===
The 2008 documentary Bloodline by Bruce Burgess, a moviemaker with an interest in paranormal claims, expands on the Jesus progeny hypothesis and other elements of The Holy Blood and the Holy Grail. Accepting as valid the testimony of an amateur archaeologist codenamed "Ben Hammott" relating to his discoveries made in the vicinity of Rennes-le-Château since 1999, Burgess claimed Ben had found the treasure of Bérenger Saunière: a mummified corpse, which they believe is Mary Magdalene, in an underground tomb they claim is associated with both the Knights Templar and the Priory of Sion. In the movie, Burgess interviews several people with alleged connections to the Priory of Sion, including a Gino Sandri and Nicolas Haywood. A book by one of the documentary's researchers, Rob Howells, entitled Inside the Priory of Sion: Revelations from the World's Most Secret Society - Guardians of the Bloodline of Jesus presented the version of the Priory of Sion as given in the 2008 documentary, which contained several erroneous assertions, such as the claim that Plantard believed in the Jesus progeny hypothesis. In 2012, however, Ben Hammott, using his real name of Bill Wilkinson, gave a podcast interview in which he apologised and confessed that everything to do with the tomb and related artifacts was a hoax, revealing that the 'tomb' had been part of a now-destroyed full-sized movie set, located in a warehouse in England.

=== Jesus bloodline claims in South and East Asia ===
Claims to a Jesus bloodline are not restricted to Europe. An analogous legend claims that the place of Jesus at the crucifixion was taken by a brother, while Jesus fled through what would become Russia and Siberia to Japan, where he became a rice farmer in the village of Shingo, Aomori Prefecture, at the north of the island of Honshu. It is claimed he married there and had a large family before his death aged 114, with descendants to the present. A Grave of Jesus (キリストの墓, Kirisuto no haka) there attracts tourists. This legend dates from the 1930s, when it was claimed that a document was discovered written in the Hebrew language and describing the marriage and later life of Jesus. The document has since disappeared.

In South Asia, the founder of the reformist Ahmaddiyya religion, Mirza Ghulam Ahmad (1835-1908), likewise claimed that Jesus survived the crucifixion and escaped the Levant, but instead placed his subsequent activities in Afghanistan and India. Specifically, he identified Jesus as the holy man, Yuzasaf, buried at the Roza Bal shrine in the Kashmir Valley of Srinagar. Fida M. Hassnain, as part of a 1970s study of this myth that brought it to the attention of western popularizers, found that the guardian of the shrine claimed to be a descendant of Jesus and a woman named 'Marjan'.

=== Other fiction ===
Other works of fiction including Jesus's descendants in the story include Harry Harrison's 1996 novel King and Emperor, the 1995 comic book Preacher and its 2016 TV-adaptation.

== Adherence ==
In reaction to The Holy Blood and the Holy Grail, The Da Vinci Code, and other controversial books, websites and movies with the same theme, a significant number of people during the late 20th and early 21st centuries have become intrigued by a Jesus bloodline hypothesis despite its lack of substantiation. While some simply entertain it as a novel intellectual proposition, others consider it as an established belief thought to be authoritative and not to be disputed. Prominent among the latter are those who expect a descendant of Jesus will eventually emerge as a great man and become a messiah, a Great Monarch who rules a Holy European Empire, during an event which they will interpret as a mystical second coming of Christ.

The eclectic spiritual opinions of these adherents are influenced by the writings of iconoclastic authors from a wide range of perspectives. Authors like Margaret Starbird and Jeffrey Bütz often seek to challenge modern beliefs and institutions through a re-interpretation of Christian history and mythology. Some try to advance and understand the equality of men and women spiritually by portraying Mary Magdalene as being the apostle of a Christian feminism, and even the personification of the mother goddess or sacred feminine, usually associating her with the Black Madonna. Some wish the ceremony that celebrated the beginning of the alleged marriage of Jesus and Mary Magdalene to be considered as a "holy wedding"; and Jesus, Mary Magdalene, and their alleged daughter, Sarah, to be considered as a "holy family", in order to question traditional gender roles and family values. Almost all these claims are at odds with scholarly Christian apologetics, and have been dismissed as being New Age Gnostic heresies.

No mainstream Christian denomination has endorsed a Jesus bloodline hypothesis as a dogma or an object of religious devotion since they maintain that Jesus, believed to be God the Son, was perpetually celibate, continent and chaste, and metaphysically married to the Church. He died, was resurrected, ascended to heaven, and will eventually return to earth, thereby making all Jesus bloodline hypotheses and related messianic expectations impossible.

Many fundamentalist Christians believe the Antichrist, prophesied in the Book of Revelation, plans to present himself as descended from the Davidic line to bolster his false claim that he is the Jewish Messiah. The intention of such propaganda would be to influence the opinions, emotions, attitudes, and behavior of Jews and philo-Semites to achieve his Satanic objectives. An increasing number of fringe Christian eschatologists believe the Antichrist may also present himself as descended from the Jesus bloodline to capitalize on growing sympathy with the hypothesis in the general public.

== Criticism ==
The notion of a progeny from Jesus and Mary Magdalene and its supposed relationship to the Merovingians, as well as to their alleged modern descendants, is strongly dismissed as pseudohistorical by a qualified majority of Christian and secular historians such as Darrell Bock and Bart D. Ehrman, along with journalists and investigators such as Jean-Luc Chaumeil, who has an extensive archive on this subject matter.

In 2005, UK television presenter and amateur archaeologist Tony Robinson edited and narrated a detailed rebuttal of the main arguments of Dan Brown and those of Baigent, Leigh, and Lincoln, "The Real Da Vinci Code", shown on Channel 4. The programme featured lengthy interviews with many of the main protagonists, and cast severe doubt on the alleged landing of Mary Magdalene in France, among other related myths, by interviewing on film the inhabitants of Saintes-Maries-de-la-Mer, the centre of the cult of Saint Sarah.

Robert Lockwood, the Roman Catholic Diocese of Pittsburgh's director for communications, considers the notion of the Church conspiring to cover-up the truth about a Jesus bloodline as a deliberate piece of anti-Catholic propaganda. He considers it as part of a long tradition of anti-Catholic sentiment with deep roots in the American Protestant imagination but going back to the very start of the Reformation of 1517.

Ultimately, the notion that a person living millennia ago has a small number of descendants living presently is statistically improbable. Steve Olson, author of Mapping Human History: Genes, Race, and Our Common Origins, published an article in Nature demonstrating that, as a matter of statistical probability:

If anyone living today is descended from Jesus, so are most of us on the planet.

Historian Ken Mondschein ridiculed the notion that a distinct bloodline of Jesus and Mary Magdalene could have been preserved:

Infant mortality in pre-modern times was ridiculously high, and you'd only need one childhood accident or disease in 2,000 years to wipe out the bloodline … keep the children of Christ marrying each other, on the other hand, and eventually they'd be so inbred that the sons of God would have flippers for feet.

Chris Lovegrove, who reviewed The Holy Blood and the Holy Grail when first published in 1982, dismissed the significance of a Jesus bloodline, even if it were proven to exist despite all evidence to the contrary:

If there really is a Jesus dynasty – so what? This, I fear, will be the reaction of many of those prepared to accept the authors' thesis as possible, and the book does not really satisfy one's curiosity in this crucial area.
