= Order of Sion =

Catholic medieval order

The Order of Sion was a mediaeval order of canons which, according to a papal bull of the 12th century, had abbeys on Mount Sion in Jerusalem, on Mount Carmel, in Southern Italy (Calabria), and in France. The Order occupied its "mother" abbey, the Abbey de Notre Dame du Mont Sion, built on the foundations of the original apostolic Cenacle, or Coenaculum, traditionally assumed to be the location of the Last Supper. The abbey was maintained up until c1291, when it fell to the Muslims.

Connections with the Priory of Sion are generally believed to be a hoax perpetrated in the 1960s in France.
