= Sierra Nine =

1963 British children's sci-fi TV series

- Genre: Science fiction
- Written by: Peter Hayes
- Directed by: Marc Miller
- Starring: David Sumner; Deborah Stanford; Max Kirby
- Country of origin: United Kingdom
- Original language: English
- No. of series: 1
- No. of episodes: 13

Production
- Running time: 25 minutes
- Production company: Associated-Rediffusion

Original release
- Network: ITV
- Release: 7 May 1963 – 30 July 1964

Sierra Nine is a 1963 British children's science fiction television series created by Associated-Rediffusion for ITV.

== Overview ==
Sierra Nine is an organisation responsible for monitoring threats to the scientific equilibrium of the planet. The organisation is led by Sir Willoughby Dodd who is joined by his young assistants, Peter Chance and Anna Parsons who embark on dangerous missions around the world.

== Cast ==
- David Sumner as Peter Chance
- Deborah Stanford as Anna Parsons
- Max Kirby as Sir Willoughby Dodd
- Harold Kasket as The Baron
- Henry Lincoln as King Sharifa
- Julian Sherrie as Colonel Selim
- David Garth as Sir Hugo Petersham
- Ronald Ibbs as Professor Portman

== Episodes ==
Episode No.	Episode Title	Original Broadcast Date	Archive Status
1	"The Brain Machine: Part 1"	7 May 1963	Missing
2	"The Brain Machine: Part 2"	14 May 1963	Missing
3	"The Brain Machine: Part 3"	21 May 1963	Missing
4	"The Brain Machine: Part 4"	28 May 1963	Missing
5	"The Man Who Shook the World: Part 1"	4 June 1963	Missing
6	"The Man Who Shook the World: Part 2"	11 June 1963	Missing
7	"The Man Who Shook the World: Part 3"	18 June 1963	Missing
8	"The Elixir of Life: Part 1"	25 June 1963	Missing
9	"The Elixir of Life: Part 2"	2 July 1963	Picture Exists (Sound Missing)
10	"The Q-Radiation: Part 1"	9 July 1963	Missing
11	"The Q-Radiation: Part 2"	16 July 1963	Missing
12	"The Q-Radiation: Part 3"	23 July 1963	Missing
13	"The Q-Radiation: Part 4"	30 July 1963	Missing

== Archive status ==
Twelve of the 13 episodes are missing; only episode 9, "The Elixir of Life: Part 2", survives, without sound. Edited highlights of the surviving episode were included on the BFI's DVD and Blu-ray release of the Associated-Rediffusion sci-fi series, Object Z.
