= Philippe de Chérisey =

French actor and writer

- Born: Philippe Louis Henri Marie de Chérisey; 13 February 1923; Paris, France
- Died: 17 July 1985 (aged 62); Paris, France
- Occupations: radio humorist, supporting actor, writer
- Known for: surrealist, Priory of Sion

Philippe Louis Henri Marie de Chérisey, 9th marquess de Chérisey (13 February 1923 – 17 July 1985) was a French writer, radio humorist, surrealist and supporting actor (using the stage name Amédée).

He is best known for his creation of fake parchments published in the 1967 book L'Or de Rennes by Gérard de Sède, as part of his involvement in the Priory of Sion hoax between 1962 and 1983.

== Early life ==
Coming from a wealthy family in the Lorraine, de Chérisey decided to become an actor against his family's wishes. He enrolled in the René Simon drama school in 1946 where he started his actor's training, and his most notable film appearance was in Jeux interdits in 1952. He was known as a bon viveur, regularly enjoyed wine and frequented public libraries where his natural curiosity made him follow up anything that took his fancy.

== Surrealism ==
Philippe de Chérisey was a follower of the surrealist movement. He claimed acquaintance with Eugene Ionesco and was like him a member of the College of Pataphysics, although - like his membership of Oulipo - there is no evidence that he was actively involved. His desire to subvert the norms of culture, or in other words, create an alternate reality that became more real than reality itself, was done within the context of the Priory of Sion and to promote the claim that Pierre Plantard was the direct descendant of Dagobert II. He considered himself a satirist from his days in French radio, and continued this persona within the theme of the Priory of Sion calling himself a prankster. The best known example of this is his esoteric novella Circuit (originally written in 1968, but not actually deposited within the Bibliothèque nationale de France until 1971).

== Rennes-le-Château ==
By the early 1960s Philippe de Chérisey met Pierre Plantard, and together they developed an interest in Rennes-le-Château. From the mid-1950s local hotelier Noël Corbu circulated a story to boost trade, that the 19th century priest Bérenger Saunière of Rennes-le-Château had discovered the treasure of Blanche of Castile. The author Robert Charroux published Corbu's story in his 1962 book Trésors du Monde. In a letter dated 2 April 1965 to his girlfriend, de Chérisey wrote: "Don't tell anyone, but I'll be setting out again for four days in the Pyrenees with Plantard to see if we can get any closer to Mary Magdalene." A mixture of de Chérisey's humor and surrealism can be identified within his activities relating to the Priory of Sion hoax, Gisors and Rennes-le-Château, contained in his correspondence as well as in his documents that he deposited in the Bibliothèque nationale de France in Paris.

=== Parchments ===
During the early 1960s, de Chérisey forged two parchments, photocopies of which appeared in the 1967 book L'Or de Rennes by Gérard de Sède. De Sède's book adapted Corbu's story to fit-in with Plantard's claims about the Priory of Sion. The parchments hinted at the survival of the line of the Frankish king Dagobert II, that Plantard claimed to be descended from, as well as attempting to verify the existence of the 1000-year-old secret society, the Priory of Sion. The two parchments were later used as source material for the 1982 book The Holy Blood and the Holy Grail, which was itself used as a primary source for the 2003 bestselling novel The Da Vinci Code. Other documents, containing fake genealogies, were planted in the French National Library, the Bibliothèque Nationale in Paris throughout the 1960s, 1970s and 1980s.

Pierre Plantard and Gérard de Sède fell out over book royalties when L'Or de Rennes was published in 1967, at the same time Philippe de Chérisey announced that he had forged the parchments. De Chérisey elaborated about this in his 1978 unpublished document L'Énigme de Rennes, claiming they were originally made for his friend Francis Blanche, as material for a French radio serial entitled Signé Furax. A second document by de Chérisey entitled Pierre et papier ("Stone and Paper") provides a more detailed explanation, giving the more complicated decoding technique to one of the parchments by using a Knight's Tour 25-letter alphabet, omitting the letter "w", which can only be known to the forger. An English translation of this document, together with a reproduction of the original, was published by Jean-Luc Chaumeil in 2010.

=== Details of the forgeries ===
The text of parchment I was copied from Codex Bezae, an Old Latin/Greek diglot from the 5th century CE contained in the book by Fulcran Grégoire Vigouroux, Dictionnaire De La Bible (1895). Philippe de Chérisey's reason for copying the passage from the Codex Bezae was his interest in the phrase "In Sabbato Secundo Primo", also found in the Gospel of Luke 6:1. Philippe de Chérisey stated: "This phrase has given headaches to the anonymous (secret) societies. It has to be said that 'A day of Sabbath, second first' is not really translatable. No one has ever heard of that. So, as the disciples walk through a cornfield and, being hungry, eat the corn, there and then, it must mean 'Second Sabbath following the first day of the shewbread.' This is the only interpretation we could find." De Chérisey went on to provide his own interpretation: "In Sabbato Secundo Primo does not mean 'A day of Sabbath, second first' but rather 'As second in command, Sabassius became first.' What is interesting is that the witches' meetings are called 'Sabbaths', not because of the Jewish celebrations, but because of Sabassius, god of the Phrygians".

This parchment also contained an encrypted message written in modern French: "À Dagobert II Roi et à Sion est ce trésor et il est là mort." (translated as "To King Dagobert II and to Sion does this treasure belong, and he is there, dead").

De Chérisey also chose to copy material from Vigouroux because he was a priest connected with the Church of St Sulpice, a location that had been exploited as part of the Priory of Sion myths as created by Plantard and de Chérisey, so de Chérisey's utilisation of this priest fitted in nicely into these myths.

According to an investigation into the Priory of Sion hoax by the American news program 60 Minutes, parchment II was copied from a 19th-century version of the Latin Vulgate published by John Wordsworth and Henry J. White Novum Testamentum Domini Nostri Iesu Christi latine secundum sancti Hieronymi (Oxford: Clarendon Press, 1889–1954), and the original forged parchments are now in the possession of Jean-Luc Chaumeil, a French writer, who states that he had their age analyzed, and it was confirmed that they were merely decades old, not centuries. Chaumeil also has letters by de Chérisey, which contain proof that De Chérisey was knowingly engaging in a fraud.

That Philippe de Chérisey was not a specialist of Latin paleography and had even a bit lost his Latin knowledge (got from high school) is demonstrated in his copying of the Latin Text from the Codex Bezae for one of his parchments: for instance, he made several of the most basic errors in copying the Latin uncials, which therefore garbles the spelling of multiple words. This information is frequently omitted by those who present the parchments as being authentic.

In an interview during the 1970s with author Jean-Luc Chaumeil, Philippe de Chérisey asserted: "the parchments of the Gospel according to Saint Luke fabricated by me and for which I pinched the uncial text from the work L'archéologie chrétienne (Christian Archaeology) by Dom Cabrol at the National Library, section C25".

Philippe de Chérisey asserted in a letter dated 29 January 1974 to French author Pierre Jarnac: "P.S. Do you know that the famous manuscripts supposedly discovered by the Abbé Saunière were composed in 1965? And that I took responsibility for being the author?"

According to Henry Lincoln, one of the co-authors of Holy Blood Holy Grail, Plantard admitted to him in person that the various documents had been forged, and identified de Chérisey as their creator.

=== Relationship with Plantard ===
A schism developed between Pierre Plantard and Philippe de Chérisey in 1983, when de Chérisey began collaborating with Paul Rouelle (his dentist) on a book which would have incorporated the Priory of Sion concepts.

French author Pierre Jarnac reproduced part of a letter he received dated 22 May 1985 from Pierre Plantard: "You need to know only that I have no involvement whatsoever with the 'deathless prose' of Monsieur Philippe de Chérisey, who was the co-author with Monsieur Paul Rouelle of the book COURT-CIRCUIT, lodged with the BN in December 1984 or January 1985, which dragged my name through the mud. The Marquis de Chérisey was a good friend of mine from university days, but I very often disapprove of his books which are really quite bizarre."

== Later years ==
Philippe de Chérisey died in Paris on 17 July 1985, while working to finish an encyclopedia of trema. His funeral was held at the Church of the Holy Trinity in Paris and he was buried in the family vault at Rœux (Pas-de-Calais). His former wife Phyllis Phillips died in 1987.

His death was announced by Gino Sandri in number 10 of Etudes Mérovingiennes (August 1985), the journal of the association Cercle Saint Dagobert II.

== Works ==
- Un mauvais quart d'heure à passer, ou La Vengeance de la grosse molaire (Pierre Billard and Pierre Tchernia, 1949). Bibliothèque nationale, manuscript 4- YA RAD- 4097
- with Grégoire (= Roland Dubillard), Livre à vendre, Paris : Éditions de Paris (1957, new edition Paris : J.-C. Simoën, 1977).
- Anacharsis à l'Exposition : Textes d'Amédée, présentés par Philippe Dasnoy, Bruxelles: Éditions Jeune Belgique (1958), 2 vols (letters read by the author during the "Étoile 58" Belgian radio-programme).
- Le pied à coulisse (Radiodiffusion française, 1960). Bibliothèque nationale, manuscript 4- YA RAD- 8630.
- Circuit (dated 1968, deposited in the Bibliothèque nationale 28 June 1971; EL 4-Y-413). Slightly different versions of this novel exist in the possession of private individuals
- L'Or de Rennes pour un Napoléon (1975). Bibliothèque nationale, 4-LB44-2360
- L'Enigme de Rennes (1978). Bibliothèque nationale, EL 4-Z PIECE-110 and EL 4-Z PIECE-111
- "Jarry lecteur de Poe et de Shakespeare", in AARevue 115 (janvier-février 1979), Liège.
- "Catalogue des circonflexes communs", "Circonflexe des propres" et "Circonflexe et Tréma", in AARevue 123 ("Absolu 107", sept.-oct. 1979).
- Lettre ouverte à Monsieur Laurent Dailliez (1980). Bibliothèque nationale, EL 4-Y PIECE- 344
- Court-circuit by Paul Rouelle, avec un feu d'artifices de Ph. de Cherisey, Liège : P. Rouelle (1983, enlarged ed. Paris : l'Oeil du sphinx, 2010).
- "Jésus Christ, sa femme et les mérovingiens", in Nostra L'Actualite Insolite (Number 584, 1983).
- L'Affaire Jean-Luc Chaumeil (1984). Bibliothèque nationale, EL 4-Z PIECE-245
- Un veau à cinq pattes: notes sur l'oeuvre de l'abbé H. Boudet, sur ses sources, son tempérament, son idéal et sa vie (France secret, 2008). ISBN 978-2-916797-16-8
