= The Holy Blood and the Holy Grail =

1982 speculative history book

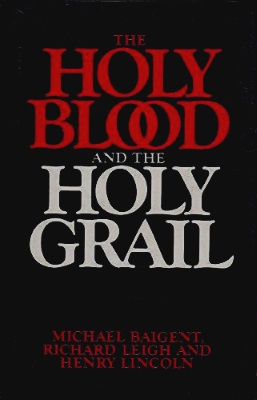
- Cover of the 1982 hardcover edition
- Authors: Michael Baigent, Richard Leigh, and Henry Lincoln
- Language: English
- Publisher: Jonathan Cape
- Publication date: 1982, 1996, 2005, 2006
- Publication place: United Kingdom
- Pages: xvi, 461
- ISBN: 978-0-440-03662-3
- OCLC: 79037955
- Followed by: The Messianic Legacy

The Holy Blood and the Holy Grail, published as Holy Blood, Holy Grail in the United States, is a book by Michael Baigent, Richard Leigh, and Henry Lincoln. The book was first published in 1982 by Jonathan Cape in London as an unofficial follow-up to three BBC Two TV documentaries that were part of the Chronicle series. The paperback version was first published in 1983 by Corgi books. A sequel to the book, called The Messianic Legacy, was originally published in 1986. The original work was reissued in an illustrated hardcover version with new material in 2005.

In The Holy Blood and the Holy Grail, the authors put forward a hypothesis that the historical Jesus married Mary Magdalene, had one or more children, and that those children or their descendants emigrated to what is now southern France. Once there, they intermarried with the noble families that would eventually become the Merovingian dynasty, whose special claim to the throne of France is championed today by a secret society called the Priory of Sion. They concluded that the legendary Holy Grail is simultaneously the womb of Mary Magdalene and the sacred royal bloodline she gave birth to.

An international bestseller upon its release, The Holy Blood and the Holy Grail spurred interest in a number of ideas related to its central thesis. Response from professional historians and scholars from related fields was negative. They argued that the bulk of the claims, ancient mysteries, and conspiracy theories presented as facts are pseudohistorical. Historian Richard Barber called the book "the most notorious of all the Grail pseudo-histories ... which proceeds by innuendo, not by refutable scholarly debate."

In a 1982 review of the book for The Observer, novelist and literary critic Anthony Burgess wrote: "It is typical of my unregenerable soul that I can only see this as a marvellous theme for a novel." The theme was later promoted by Margaret Starbird in her 1993 book The Woman with the Alabaster Jar and dramatised by Dan Brown in his 2003 novel The Da Vinci Code.

== Background ==
One of the books that influenced the project was L'Or de Rennes (later re-published as Le Trésor Maudit), a 1967 book by Gérard de Sède, with the collaboration of Pierre Plantard. After reading it, Henry Lincoln persuaded BBC Two to produce a series of documentaries for their Chronicle series, which became quite popular and generated thousands of responses. Lincoln then joined forces with Michael Baigent and Richard Leigh for further research. This led them to the pseudohistorical Dossiers Secrets at the Bibliothèque nationale de France which, though alleging to portray hundreds of years of medieval history, were actually all written by Pierre Plantard and Philippe de Chérisey under the pseudonym of "Philippe Toscan du Plantier". Unaware that the documents had been forged, Baigent, Leigh and Lincoln used them as a major source for their book.

Comparing themselves to the reporters who uncovered the Watergate scandal, the authors maintain that only through speculative "synthesis can one discern the underlying continuity, the unified and coherent fabric, which lies at the core of any historical problem." To do so, one must realize that "it is not sufficient to confine oneself exclusively to facts."

== Content ==
In The Holy Blood and the Holy Grail, Baigent, Leigh and Lincoln posit the existence of a secret society known as the Priory of Sion, which is supposed to have a long history starting in 1099 and had illustrious Grand Masters including Leonardo da Vinci and Isaac Newton. According to the authors' claims, the Priory of Sion is devoted to restoring the Merovingian dynasty, which ruled the Franks from 457 to 751, on the thrones of France and the rest of Europe. The Priory is also said to have created the Knights Templar as its military arm and financial branch.

The authors re-interpreted the Dossiers Secrets "in the light of their own Biblical obsessions." Contrary to Plantard's initial Franco-Israelist claim that the Merovingians were only descended from the Tribe of Benjamin, they asserted that the Priory of Sion protects Merovingian dynasts because they are the lineal descendants of the historical Jesus and his alleged wife, Mary Magdalene, traced further back to King David. According to them, the legendary Holy Grail is simultaneously the womb of saint Mary Magdalene and the sacred royal bloodline she gave birth to, and the Church tried to kill off all remnants of this bloodline and their supposed guardians, the Cathars and the Templars, in order for popes to hold the episcopal throne through the apostolic succession without fear of it ever being usurped by an antipope from the hereditary succession of Mary Magdalene. The authors therefore concluded that the modern goals of the Priory of Sion are:

- the public revelation of the tomb and shrine of Sigebert IV as well as the lost treasure of the Temple in Jerusalem, which supposedly contains genealogical records that prove the Merovingian dynasty was of the Davidic line, to facilitate Merovingian restoration in France
- the re-institutionalization of chivalric knighthood and the promotion of pan-European nationalism
- the establishment of a theocratic "United States of Europe": a Holy European Empire politically and religiously unified through the imperial cult of a Merovingian Great Monarch who occupies both the throne of Europe and the Holy See
- the actual governance of Europe residing with the Priory of Sion through a one-party European Parliament.

The authors incorporated the antisemitic and anti-Masonic tract known as The Protocols of the Elders of Zion into their story, concluding that it was actually based on the master plan of the Priory of Sion. They presented it as the most persuasive piece of evidence for the existence and activities of the Priory of Sion by arguing that the original text on which the published version of The Protocols of the Elders of Zion was based had nothing to do with Judaism or an "international Jewish conspiracy", as it issued from a Masonic body practicing the Scottish Rite which incorporated the word "Zion" in its name. Per Baigent et al, the text was not intended to be released publicly, but was a program for gaining control of Freemasonry as part of a strategy to infiltrate and reorganise church and state according to esoteric Christian principles. After a failed attempt to gain influence in the court of Tsar Nicholas II of Russia, Sergei Nilus was supposed to have changed the original text to forge an inflammatory tract in 1903 in order to discredit the esoteric clique around Papus by implying they were Judaeo-Masonic conspirators but ignored some esoteric Christian elements, which hence remained unchanged in the published antisemitic canard.

== Criticism ==
The claims made in The Holy Blood and the Holy Grail have been the source of much investigation and criticism over the years, with many independent investigators such as 60 Minutes, Channel 4, Discovery Channel, Time Magazine, and the BBC concluding that many of the book's claims are not credible or verifiable. Pierre Plantard stated on the Jacques Pradel radio interview on France-Inter, 18 February 1982:

I admit that The Sacred Enigma (French title for The Holy Blood and the Holy Grail) is a good book, but one must say that there is a part that owes more to fiction than to fact, especially in the part that deals with the lineage of Jesus. How can you prove a lineage of four centuries from Jesus to the Merovingians? I have never put myself forward as a descendant of Jesus Christ.

There are no references to the Jesus bloodline in the "Priory of Sion documents" and the link exists only within the context of a hypothesis made by the authors of The Holy Blood and the Holy Grail. From the Conspiracies On Trial: The Da Vinci Code documentary:

The authors of the 1980s bestseller The Holy Blood and the Holy Grail re-interpreted the Dossiers in the light of their own Biblical obsessions – the secret buried in the documents ceased to be the Merovingian bloodline and became the bloodline of Christ – the genealogies led to Christ's descendants.

While Pierre Plantard claimed that the Merovingians were descended from the Tribe of Benjamin, the Jesus bloodline hypothesis found in The Holy Blood and the Holy Grail instead hypothesized that the Merovingians were descended from both the Benjamin line and the Davidic line of the Tribe of Judah, as embodied in the child of Mary Magdalen by virtue of a dynastic marriage. Historian Marina Warner commented on The Holy Blood and the Holy Grail when it was first published:

Of course there's not much harm in thinking that Jesus was married (nor are these authors the first to suggest it), or that his descendants were King Pippin and Charles Martel. But there is harm in strings of lurid falsehoods and distorted reasoning. The method bends the mind the wrong way, an insidious and real corruption.

Historian Ken Mondschein ridiculed the idea of a Jesus bloodline, writing:

The idea of keeping the family tree pruned to bonsai-like proportions is also completely fallacious. Infant mortality in pre-modern times was ridiculously high, and you'd only need one childhood accident or disease in 2000 years to wipe out the bloodline; if, however, even one extra sibling per generation survived to reproduce, the numbers of descendants would increase at an exponential rate; keep the children of Christ marrying each other, on the other hand, and eventually they'd be so inbred that the sons of God would have flippers for feet.

Historian Richard Barber wrote:

The Templar-Grail myth ... is at the heart of the most notorious of all the Grail pseudo-histories, The Holy Blood and The Holy Grail, which is a classic example of the conspiracy theory of history ... It is essentially a text which proceeds by innuendo, not by refutable scholarly debate ... Essentially, the whole argument is an ingeniously constructed series of suppositions combined with forced readings of such tangible facts as are offered.

In 2005, Tony Robinson narrated The Real Da Vinci Code, shown on Channel 4, a critical evaluation of the main arguments of Baigent, Leigh and Lincoln (and subsequently Dan Brown). The programme included lengthy interviews with many of the protagonists. Arnaud de Sède, son of Gérard de Sède, stated categorically that his father and Plantard had made up the existence of a 1,000-year-old Priory of Sion, and described the story as "piffle." The programme concluded that, in the opinion of the presenter and researchers, the claims of Holy Blood were based on little more than a series of guesses.

Despite the "Priory of Sion mysteries" having been exhaustively debunked by journalists and scholars as France's greatest 20th-century literary hoax, some commentators express concern that the proliferation and popularity of pseudohistorical books, websites and films inspired by the Priory of Sion hoax contribute to the problem of unfounded conspiracy theories becoming mainstream; while others are troubled by how these works romanticize the reactionary ideologies of the far right.

Quoting Robert McCrum, literary editor of The Observer newspaper, about The Holy Blood and the Holy Grail:

There is something called historical evidence – there is something called the historical method – and if you look around the shelves of bookshops there is a lot of history being published, and people mistake this type of history for the real thing. These kinds of books do appeal to an enormous audience who believe them to be 'history', but actually they aren't history, they are a kind of parody of history. Alas, though, I think that one has to say that this is the direction that history is going today...

== Influence and similarities ==
=== The Da Vinci Code ===
The 2003 conspiracy fiction novel The Da Vinci Code by Dan Brown makes reference to this book, also liberally using most of the above claims as key plot elements. In 2005, Baigent and Leigh unsuccessfully sued Brown's publisher, Random House, for plagiarism, on the grounds that Brown's book makes extensive use of their research and that one of the characters is named Leigh, has a surname (Teabing) which is an anagram of Baigent, and has a physical description strongly resembling Henry Lincoln. In his novel, Brown also mentions Holy Blood, Holy Grail as an acclaimed international bestseller, and claims it as the major contributor to his hypothesis. Perhaps as a result of this mention, Baigent and Leigh sued Dan Brown for copyright infringement. They claimed that the central framework of their plot had been stolen for the writing of The Da Vinci Code. The claim was rejected by High Court Judge Peter Smith on April 6, 2006, who ruled that "their argument was vague and shifted course during the trial and was always based on a weak foundation." It was found that the publicity of the trial had significantly boosted sales of Holy Blood (according to figures provided by Nielsen BookScan and The Bookseller). The court ruled that, in effect, because it was published as a work of alleged history, its premises legally could be freely interpreted in any subsequent fictional work without any copyright infringement.

=== Opera ===
Stewart Copeland, former drummer for the rock band The Police, composed the opera Holy Blood, Crescent Moon, heavily inspired by this book.

=== Other influences ===
The 2008 documentary film Bloodline by Bruce Burgess, a filmmaker with an interest in paranormal claims, expands on the "Jesus bloodline" hypothesis and other elements of The Holy Blood and the Holy Grail. Accepting as valid the testimony of an amateur archaeologist going under the pseudonym of "Ben Hammott", relating to his discoveries made in the vicinity of Rennes-le-Château since 1999, Burgess claims to have found the treasure of Bérenger Saunière: several mummified corpses (one of which is allegedly Mary Magdalene) in three underground tombs created by the Knights Templar under the orders of the Priory of Sion. During an interview on 21 March 2012, "Hammott", going by his real name of Bill Wilkinson, made an apologetic confession stating that everything to do with the tomb and related artifacts was a hoax, and revealed that the tomb was now destroyed, having been part of a set located in a warehouse in England.

== See also ==
- Smithy code
