= Pierre Plantard =

French author (1920–2000)

Pierre Plantard de Saint-Clair
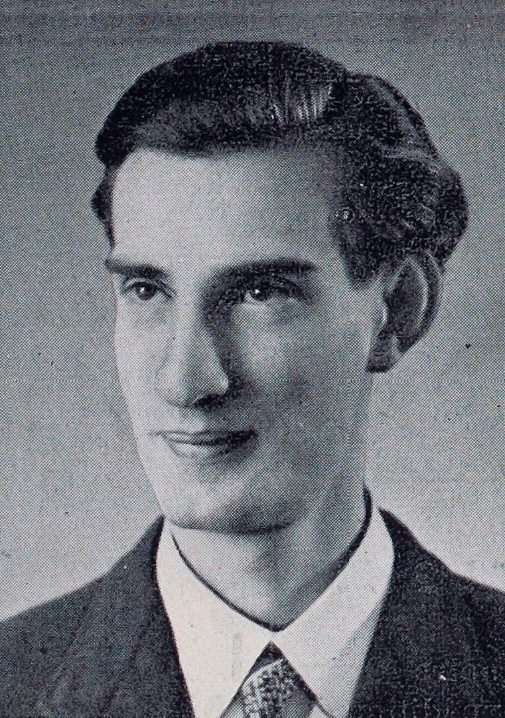
- Pierre Plantard in 1942
- Born: Pierre Athanase Marie Plantard; 18 March 1920; Paris, France
- Died: 3 February 2000 (aged 79); Paris, France
- Other name: Thuradane Vrix (Hand of Sion)
- Occupation: technical artist
- Known for: Founder of the Priory of Sion, esotericist, medium, con artist

Pierre Plantard de Saint-Clair (born Pierre Athanase Marie Plantard; 18 March 1920 – 3 February 2000) was a French technical artist, best known for being the principal fabricator of the Priory of Sion hoax, by which he claimed from the 1960s onwards that he was a male-line Merovingian descendant of Dagobert II and the "Great Monarch" prophesied by Nostradamus. Today in France, he is commonly regarded as having been a con artist.

== Early life ==
Pierre Plantard was born in 1920 in Paris, the son of a butler and a concierge (described as a cook for wealthy families in police reports of the 1940s). Leaving school at 17, he became sacristan at the church of Saint-Louis d’Antin, in the 9th Arrondissement of Paris, and from 1937 began forming mystical ultranationalist associations like The French Union (1937) and French National Renewal (1941) to support a "National Revolution".

=== Occupation of France ===
Following the dissolution of Grand Orient Freemasonry in Vichy France on 13 August 1940, Plantard wrote a letter dated 16 December 1940 to Marshal Philippe Pétain offering his services to the collaborationist government, referring to a 'terrible Masonic and Jewish conspiracy'. On 21 April 1941, Plantard wrote to the Paris Police Prefecture that his group the French National Renewal was to take possession of the unoccupied premises located at 22 place Malesherbes, 1st floor "which are currently let to an English Jew, Mr. Shapiro, who is presently fighting alongside his fellows in the British armed forces." By 1942, Plantard wanted to form another association, the Alpha Galates, membership prohibited to Jews, but the occupying German authorities refused permission.

=== Alpha Galates ===
The statutes of the Alpha Galates were deposited on 21 September 1942, describing itself as a tripartite order composed of the Temple, la Cité and les Arches. The Alpha Galates published a periodical called Vaincre - Pour une jeune chevalerie ("Conquer - for a young knighthood"), that lasted for six issues between September 1942 and February 1943, containing an anti-Semitic and anti-Masonic agenda; Plantard's disregard of the prohibition by the German authorities of the formation of the Alpha Galates earned him a four-month sentence in Fresnes Prison. The Statutes of the Alpha Galates existed in the German language as well as French.

Claude Charlot of the Paris Prefecture of Police stated on a CBS News 60 Minutes documentary that the Alpha Galates "had only four regular members". According to a police report on the Alpha Galates dated 13 February 1945, the organisation was only composed of at most 50 members, who resigned one after the other as soon as they sized up the president of the association (Pierre Plantard) and figured out that it was not a serious enterprise.

=== Post war activities ===
Following the Liberation, Plantard tried to transform the Alpha Galates into a resistance group and in 1947, tried to form "The Latin Academy".

On July 8, 1951, he was initiated into Freemasonry in the Grand Orient de France by the lodge L’Avenir du Chablais in Ambilly.

In 1951, Plantard married Anne-Léa Hisler (1930–1970). They lived in the town of Annemasse in south-east France, near the border with Switzerland, until their separation in 1956. At the same time Plantard worked as a draughtsman for the company établissements Chanovin. In 1972, he married Anne-Marie Cavaille who originated from Montauban, with Philippe de Chérisey acting as best man.

According to the late Robert Amadou (1924–2006), Pierre Plantard in 1953 was accused of selling degrees of esoteric orders for exorbitant sums. According to a more reliable source, given in a letter written by Léon Guersillon the Mayor of Annemasse in 1956, contained in the folder holding the 1956 Statutes of the Priory of Sion in the subprefecture of Saint-Julien-en-Genevois, Plantard was given a six-month sentence in December 1953 for abus de confiance (breach of trust), relating to other crimes. French researchers dispute the connection between Robert Amadou and Pierre Plantard.

=== Priory of Sion ===
On 25 June 1956, Pierre Plantard and André Bonhomme legally registered in the town of Saint-Julien-en-Genevois a new association called the Priory of Sion, based in Annemasse close to the French border near Geneva. The group was devoted to the support of building low-cost housing in Annemasse, and criticising local government through its journal Circuit. The "Sion" in the name did not refer to the ancient Land of Israel, but to a local mountain, Mont-Sion, where the order (according to its statutes) intended to establish a retreat center. The association dissolved by December 1956.

=== Committee of Public Safety and Captain Way ===
By 1958, Plantard was back living in Paris where he was actively supporting General de Gaulle during the Algerian Crisis, establishing his own version of a Committee of Public Safety (calling it the 'Central Committee') based in Paris, using the name "Captain Way", claiming it was part of the official Committee based in Algeria founded by General Jacques Massu. De Gaulle did not support the existence of any of the Committees of Public Safety, gave Algeria free elections and the country eventually got its independence, endorsed by de Gaulle, in 1962.

=== Alleged letters from General de Gaulle ===
In 1959, Plantard edited a second series of the journal Circuit, subtitled Publication Périodique Culturelle de la Fédération des Forces Françaises. It never mentioned the Priory of Sion in its pages, and dealt with paranormal and mystical topics. At the same time, Plantard was offering his services as a clairvoyant under the name of "Chyren".

It was in this second series of Circuit that Plantard allegedly claimed he received a letter from President Charles de Gaulle dated 27 June 1959. Louis Vazart referred to a letter to Plantard from de Gaulle dated 29 July 1958, also referring to another similar letter from de Gaulle dated 3 August 1958 where he allegedly thanked Plantard for his support during the Algerian crisis. None of these alleged letters from de Gaulle have ever been produced.

== Priory of Sion hoax ==
=== Gisors ===
In 1961, author Gérard de Sède had an article published in Noir et blanc about the Château de Gisors in Normandy, linked to the claims of Roger Lhomoy who, since 1946, alleged it contained the treasure of the Knights Templar. Plantard read the article and wrote to de Sède, later collaborating with him on the book Les Templiers sont parmi nous, ou, L'Enigme de Gisors ("The Templars are Amongst Us, or The Enigma of Gisors"), that was published in 1962. The name Priory of Sion reappeared within the pages of this book.

=== Rennes-le-Château ===
In 1962, author Robert Charroux published his book Trésors du monde (lit. ''Treasures of the World''), telling the story of Noël Corbu, who claimed the 19th century priest Bérenger Saunière had discovered the treasure of Blanche of Castile in the village of Rennes-le-Château. This inspired Plantard to write his own book on the subject matter but, failing to find a publisher his manuscript was extensively rewritten by Gérard de Sède resulting in the 1967 book, L'Or de Rennes. The book adapted Corbu's story to fit in with Plantard's claims about the survival of the line of Merovingian king Dagobert II, and Plantard began claiming to be descended from Dagobert II since 1964 when he began depositing false documents in the Bibliothèque nationale giving the secret history of the Priory of Sion.

These Priory of Sion documents contained false genealogies attaching Plantard's family tree to another genealogy found in an article by Louis Saurel in the French magazine Les Cahiers de l'Histoire Number 1 (1960). Plantard originally claimed these genealogies had been compiled by a Doctor Hervé and Abbé Pichon (a historical person, 1828–1905), originally at the request of Napoleon Bonaparte, who found out about the Merovingian survival from Abbé Sieyès. Plantard added that Abbé Pierre Plantard, former vicar of the Basilica of St. Clotilde, Paris (falsely claiming they were related), drew up genealogies giving the survival of the line of Dagobert II on 18 March 1939. Philippe de Chérisey, Plantard's friend and accomplice, later claimed that Abbé Pichon was the pseudonym of François Dron (a completely different historical person who was a numismatist).

When Jean-Luc Chaumeil revealed during the 1980s that Plantard's genealogical claims were fictional adaptations of Louis Saurel's article published in 1960, Plantard released a "cheque" dated 14 April 1960 showing his former wife Anne-Léa Hisler had been paid for the article contained in Les Cahiers de l'Histoire, and therefore claiming she was the original author.

The Priory Documents of the 1960s gave a revised history of the Priory of Sion, claiming it had been founded by Godfrey of Bouillon during the Crusades and named after Mount Sion in Jerusalem, conflating it with a genuine historical monastic order, the Abbey of Our Lady of Mount Zion.

De Sède's book was most famous for its reproduction of two "parchments" that were allegedly discovered by Saunière that hinted at the survival of the line of Dagobert II. However, Plantard and de Sède fell out over book royalties following the publication of L'Or de Rennes in 1967 and Philippe de Chérisey, Plantard's friend and accomplice, announced he had forged the "parchments". But it was due to the success of de Sède's book L'Or de Rennes that Pierre Plantard became famous, as the guardian of the secret of Rennes-le-Château.

By 1978, Plantard began claiming that his grandfather had met Bérenger Saunière in Rennes-le-Château, and that the real source of Saunière's wealth was the Abbé Henri Boudet, parish priest of the nearby village of Rennes-les-Bains.

=== Parchments and genealogies hoax ===
When the "parchments" were originally published in Gérard de Sède's book L'Or de Rennes in 1967, it was claimed there were four parchments originally discovered by Saunière in the hollow pillar of his church. In “L'Enigme de Rhedae” (1964) Henri Lobineau said that Saunière discovered documents bearing the royal seal of Blanche of Castile, giving the line of Dagobert II drawn up by Abbé Pichon between 1805 and 1814, using documents found during the Revolution. The parchments said the Merovingians were descended from the Tribe of Benjamin and Dagobert II had hidden an ‘accursed’ treasure in Rennes-le-Château.

This was elaborated upon in a 1965 Priory document by stating it was Abbé Antoine Bigou, one of Saunière's predecessor curés at Rennes-le-Château, who hid the parchments in 1790 in the hollow pillar that supported the church altar, after finding out about the secret of Rennes-le-Château on 17 January 1781 at the deathbed of Marie de Negri d'Ables, Marquise d'Hautpoul-Blanchefort. There were four parchments altogether, two of which were reproduced in Gérard de Sède’s forthcoming book (their contents were described in this 1965 document) and the other two containing genealogies made by the Abbé Bigou (running from 1548 to 1789) and Henri Lobineau (running from 1780 to 1915).

When in 1967 de Chérisey announced that the parchments published in L'Or de Rennes were fakes, different claims were introduced about the exact nature of Sauniere's discovery. Based on a 1966 fake letter that appeared in Dossiers Secrets allegedly written by the International League of Antiquarian Booksellers, being an adaptation of material contained in a 1964 book by René Descadeillas involving François-Pierre d'Hautpoul, these revised claims appeared in a 1977 Priory document by Jean Delaude, Le Cercle d'Ulysse. This revised version of the story stayed more-or-less intact right up to 1990, containing minor variations involving exact dates. The 1977 Priory document claimed Saunière discovered three documents: 1) a genealogy of the Counts of Rhedae dated 1243 bearing the seal of Blanche of Castile, 2) a document of 1608 relating to François-Pierre d'Hautpoul providing a complementary genealogy from 1240 onwards and, 3) a last will and testament of Henri d'Hautpoul dated 24 April 1695 bearing the stamp and signature of the testator, adding they were originally sold by Saunière's niece Madame James to two Englishmen, Captain Ronald Stansmore and Sir Thomas Frazer of the International League of Antiquarian Booksellers. Then repeating again that the parchments given in L'Or de Rennes were fakes by Philippe de Chérisey.

In 1978 Philippe de Chérisey repeated the parchments had been sold by Madame James to Captain Ronald Stanmore and Sir Thomas Frazer, adding they were deposited in a Safe deposit box of Lloyds Bank; and following an article in The Daily Express, "the demand for the recognition of Merovingian rights made in 1955 and 1956 by Sir Alexander Aikman, Sir John Montague Brocklebank, Major Hugh Murchison Clowes and nineteen other men in the office of Notary Public, P. J. F. Freeman." In 1981 Plantard circulated a French newspaper cutting of unknown provenance stating the parchments were stored in a Safe deposit box of Lloyds Bank, London.

A book published in 1983 by Louis Vazart reproduced two fake "notarised documents" allegedly dating from October 1955 naming Captain Ronald Stansmore Nutting (altered from Captain Ronald Stansmore), Major Hugh Murchison Clowes and the Right Honourable Viscount Leathers as the legal owners of the parchments discovered by Saunière "whose value cannot be estimated", and requesting the parchments — all containing proof of the survival of the line of Dagobert II — to be removed from France. The Notary Public was named as Maître Patrick Francis Jourdan Freeman.

Another "notarised document" that was later reproduced in Vaincre Number 1 (1990), gave the caption "after a photograph taken by Etienne Plantard in London in 1958", naming only Captain R.S. Nutting as the owner of the "parchments". The firm of solicitors was given as John Newton & Sons, London.

In 1989, when Plantard revised his claims about the Priory of Sion, it was stated in a 1989 issue of Vaincre: "The parchments of Blanche of Castile were in Etienne Plantard's safe-deposit box in London since November 1955 and they did not 'mention' Dagobert, or a Dagobert II and Pierre Plantard de Saint-Clair was never 'a Merovingian pretender' to the throne of France: His lineage results from the Counts de Rhédae and by the female line of Saint Clair-sur-Epte, which has no relationship with 'Sinclair'."

=== Plantard de Saint Clair ===
From 1975, Pierre Plantard used the surname Plantard de Saint-Clair, described as an epithet by Jean-Luc Chaumeil, following his interview with Plantard in the magazine l’Ère d’Aquarius. The "Saint-Clair" part of his surname was added to his real surname on the basis that this was the family name associated with the area of Gisors associated with his hoax - according to the mythology of the Priory of Sion "Jean VI des Plantard" married a member of the House of Gisors during the 12th century. Plantard also appropriated the false titles of "Comte de Saint-Clair" and "Comte de Rhédæ" to himself.

=== The Holy Blood and the Holy Grail ===
In 1982, authors Henry Lincoln, Michael Baigent and Richard Leigh published The Holy Blood and the Holy Grail. It became a bestseller and publicized Plantard's Priory of Sion story, treating seriously the content of the Priory of Sion documents of the 1960s and 1970s. The book added a new element to the story, that the Merovingian line of kings had actually been descended from the historical Jesus and Mary Magdalene, and that the purpose of the Priory (and its military arm, the Knights Templar) was to protect the secret of the Jesus bloodline. Pierre Plantard was hypothesised as the direct descendant of Jesus Christ.

In February 1982, Plantard dismissed The Holy Blood and the Holy Grail as fiction on a French radio interview, and later even dismissed the Priory of Sion documents of the 1960s and 1970s as false and irrelevant.

=== Revised claims ===
A new revived series of Vaincre appeared during the late 1980s, containing a "good luck message from Valéry Giscard d'Estaing", proponent of the United States of Europe, as well as an article attributed to Frederick Forsyth.

Plantard revised his Priory of Sion story, claiming the order was founded on 17 January 1681 in Rennes-le-Château, based upon documents discovered in Barcelona, relating to a secret involving the mystical power of ley lines and sunrise lines, and Rocco Negro (Black Rock), a promontory near Rennes-le-Château where he owned substantial property. The alleged contents of the "parchments" allegedly discovered by Saunière were revised and altered (see above). The genealogies contained in Jean Delaude's Priory document Le Cercle d'Ulysse were also revised. The previous claims found in the notarised documents published in Vazart's book in 1983 were made out of "errors of decipherment" and were falsified because of "political pressures of 1956".

In a letter dated 4 April 1989, Plantard wrote that Victor Hugo "drew up the constitutions of the Priory of Sion on 14 July 1870, on the same day that he planted the oak-tree of the United States of Europe".

In 1990, Plantard revised himself by claiming he was only descended from a cadet branch of the line of Dagobert II, while arguing that the direct descendant was really Otto von Habsburg, actually descended from Sigebert I (nicknamed "Plant-Ard"), different from Sigebert IV, who was the son of Bera II and the grandson of Wamba, the founding father of the House of Habsburg and also the builder of Habsburg Castle, drawing on content found in a 1979 book by Jean-Luc Chaumeil.

=== Roger-Patrice Pelat and downfall ===
A 1989 Priory of Sion circular cited Roger-Patrice Pelat as a Grand Master of the Priory of Sion. Pelat was a friend of the then President of France François Mitterrand and centre of a scandal involving French Prime Minister Pierre Bérégovoy. This initiative by Plantard had an unexpected consequence; in October 1993, the judge investigating the Pelat scandal had Pierre Plantard's house searched. The search failed to find any documents related to Pelat, but turned up a hoard of false documents, including some proclaiming Plantard the true king of France. Plantard admitted under oath he had fabricated everything, including Pelat's involvement with the Priory of Sion.

Plantard was later threatened with legal action by the Pelat family and therefore disappeared to his house in southern France. He was 74 years old at the time.

== Death ==
Nothing more was heard of Plantard until he died in Paris on 3 February 2000. His remains were cremated.

== Works ==
- Vaincre: Pour une Jeune Chevalerie (editor, six issues, 1942–1943). Bibliothèque nationale, RES 4- LC2-7335
- Circuit. Bulletin d'Information et de Défense des Droits et de la Liberté des Foyers H.L.M. (editor, twelve issues, 1956). Bibliothèque nationale, 4-JO-12078
- Circuit, Publication Périodique Culturelle de la Fédération des Forces Françaises (editor, originally nine issues, 1959). Bibliothèque nationale, 4-JO-14140
- Gisors et son secret (1961). Bibliothèque nationale, 4-LK7-56747
- Tableaux Comparatifs des Charges Sociales dans les Pays du Marché Commun (1961). Bibliothèque nationale, 4-R PIECE-5274
- Victor Hugo (1978). Bibliothèque nationale, 4-LN27-75000
- Preface to Henri Boudet, La Vraie Langue Celtique et le Cromleck de Rennes-les-Bains (Paris: Éditions Pierre Belfond, 1978). ISBN 2-7144-1186-X
- L'Or de Rennes: mise au point (1979). Bibliothèque nationale, 4-Z PIECE-1182
- "L'Horloge Sacrée qui permet décoder les quatrains", in Nostra, Special-Issue Number 1 (1982).
- Vaincre (editor, four issues, 1989–1990). Bibliothèque nationale, 4-JO-57134
