= Dossiers Secrets d'Henri Lobineau =

Disputed historical document

The Dossiers Secrets d'Henri Lobineau ("Secret Files of Henri Lobineau"), supposedly compiled by Philippe Toscan du Plantier, is a 27-page document which was deposited in the Bibliothèque nationale de France on 27 April 1967. The document purports to represent a part of the history of the Priory of Sion, and is widely considered to be a forgery created by Pierre Plantard and Philippe de Chérisey. Thirteen of the 27 pages of the document are taken from another document attributed to "Henri Lobineau" dating from 1964, also thought to have been authored by Plantard, called Généalogie des Rois Mérovingiens ("Genealogy of the Merovingian Kings"). This document contains genealogy diagrams which apparently show Plantard to be a descendant of the Merovingian king Dagobert II.

== Contents ==
Dossiers Secrets d'Henri Lobineau comprises the following material (along with the 13 pages taken from Généalogie des Rois Mérovingiens):

- An introduction to the document by an Edmond Albe, containing a dedication signed by Philippe Toscan du Plantier, addressed to "Monsignor the Comté de Rhedae, Duc de Razès, the legitimate descendant of Clovis I, King of France, Serene ardent shoot of the 'King and Saint' Dagobert II". Albe makes mention of Henri Boudet who supposedly communicated a secret to Léopold Vannier, Superior of the Brotherhood of Notre-Dame de Marceille, By Limoux, Aude. Albe also claims that Émile Hoffet's library ended up in the possession of the International League of Antiquarian Booksellers, before becoming part of the secret archives of the Knights of Malta.
- Maps of France and a Merovingian genealogy from a scholarly book not specified in the document.
- Newspaper clippings relating to the freedom of Occitania.
- A spurious letter attributed to Noël Corbu, containing part of the envelope postmarked 'Couiza 1962' and relating to Émile Hoffet, addressed to Herbert Regis, who, according to Edmond Albe, was to meet Fakhar ul Islam who was carrying the secret leather briefcase of Leo Schidlof ('Henri Lobineau'), but died before he could reach him.
- A spurious letter to Marius Fatin from the "International League of Antiquarian Booksellers" dated 2 July 1966.
- A list of the Grand Masters of the Priory of Sion.
- A page that is a plagiarism of various paragraphs from Paul Le Cour's 1937 book, The Age of Aquarius.
- An obituary of the priest M. L'abbé Geraud de Cayron.

== Holy Blood, Holy Grail ==
The documents were used as source material by Henry Lincoln (who appeared to be unaware that they were disputed as forgeries) for a series of BBC Two documentaries in the 1970s. Lincoln and two co-authors, Richard Leigh and Michael Baigent, again used the Dossiers Secrets as source material for the controversial 1982 publication of Holy Blood, Holy Grail. Elements of this work were later used by Dan Brown as sources for his successful novel The Da Vinci Code.
