= Sigebert IV =

According to the pseudohistorical Dossiers Secrets d'Henri Lobineau and related documents, Sigebert IV was the son of the Merovingian king Dagobert II who, on the assassination of his father, was rescued by his sister and smuggled to the domain of his mother, the (otherwise unknown) Visigoth princess Giselle de Razès in Rennes-le-Château. He is said to have arrived in the Languedoc in 681 and, at some point, adopted or inherited his uncle's titles, duke of Razès and count of Rhedae. He is also said to have adopted the surname, or nickname, of “Plant-Ard” (subsequently Plantard) from the French appellation ‘rejeton ardent’ ‘ardently flowering shoot’ of the Merovingian vine. Under this name, and under the titles acquired from his uncle, he is said to have perpetuated his lineage.

Journalists and scholars who have debunked the Priory of Sion hoax argue that Pierre Plantard created the Dossiers Secrets d'Henri Lobineau and the fictitious biography of Sigebert IV to support his false claim that he was a descendant of the extinct Merovingian dynasty through this figure. In 1990, Plantard revised himself by claiming he was only descended from a cadet branch of the line of Dagobert II, while arguing that the direct descendant was really Otto von Habsburg, who, according to Plantard, was descended from Sigebert I (the son of Bera II and the grandson of Wamba), who married Magdala, the granddaughter of Dagobert II.

In the 10th-century biography of Saint Arbogast, Vita Sancti Argobasti, Sigebert is mentioned but not named as having died during a hunting accident and later miraculously raised from the dead by Arbogast, Bishop of Strasbourg and close friend of Dagobert II.

== See also ==
- Dossiers Secrets d'Henri Lobineau
- Dagobert II
- Merovingian dynasty
- Pierre Plantard
- Priory of Sion
- Sigebert III
