= Bloodline (2008 film) =

- Directed by: Bruce Burgess
- Written by: Bruce Burgess
- Release date: May 9, 2008
- Running time: 113 minutes
- Country: United States
- Language: English

Bloodline is a 2008 documentary film by Bruce Burgess and Rene Barnett, a filmmaker with an interest in paranormal claims, focused on the "Jesus bloodline" hypothesis and other elements of the 1982 book The Holy Blood and the Holy Grail.

The 2008 documentary was originally released in cinemas on 9 May. "Ben Hammott" relating to his alleged discoveries made in the vicinity of Rennes-le-Château since 1999; Burgess claims Ben Hammott would have found the treasure of Bérenger Saunière: a mummified corpse, which he believed were Mary Magdalene. In the film, Burgess interviews several people with alleged connections to the Priory of Sion, including a Gino Sandri and Nicolas Haywood. A book by one of the documentary's researchers, Rob Howells, entitled Inside the Priory of Sion: Revelations from the World's Most Secret Society - Guardians of the Bloodline of Jesus presented the version of the Priory of Sion as given in the 2008 documentary, which contained several erroneous assertions, such as the claim that Plantard believed in the Jesus bloodline hypothesis.

Bruce Burgess returned to the subject matter with The Bloodline of Christ that was shown in September 2013 on the Yesterday channel.
