= Jean de Gisors =

Norman lord

Jean de Gisors (c. 1133–1220) was a Norman lord of the fortress of Gisors in Normandy, where meetings were traditionally convened between English and French kings. It was here, in 1188, a squabble occurred that involved the cutting of an elm.

Initially, Jean was a vassal of the king of England – Henry II and then Richard I. During this time, he also owned property in Sussex and the manor of Titchfield in Hampshire in England.

Some time between 1170 and 1180, Jean purchased the manor of Buckland, Hampshire, from the de Port family. On this newly purchased land, he founded the town of Portsmouth as one end of a trade route between England and France. The original settlement of Portsmouth was a planned town on a medieval grid pattern, of which other examples can be found in places like Salisbury. Much of this original grid pattern is still visible in the Old Portsmouth district of Portsmouth.

One of the first acts ordered by Jean in Portsmouth was the donation of land to the Augustinian canons of Southwick Priory so that they could build a chapel "to the glorious honour of the martyr Thomas of Canterbury, one time Archbishop, on (my) land which is called Sudewede, the island of Portsea", Thomas Becket having spent much time in Gisors. This foundation of the Church of St Thomas of Canterbury was to eventually become Portsmouth Cathedral.

However the royal patronage of Jean was not to last, as after his support for an unsuccessful rebellion in Normandy in 1194 he paid the price by forfeiting all his lands, including Portsmouth, to Richard I.

== In popular culture ==
In conspiracy theories, such as the one promoted in The Holy Blood and the Holy Grail, Jean has been alleged to be the first Grand Master of the Priory of Sion (1188–1220).
