= Henry Lincoln =

British writer (1930–2022)

- Born: Henry Soskin; 12 February 1930; London, England
- Died: 23 February 2022 (aged 92); France
- Education: Royal Academy of Dramatic Art
- Occupations: Actor, screenwriter, author
- Known for: Co-author The Holy Blood and the Holy Grail
- Notable work: Doctor Who

Henry Soskin (12 February 1930 – 23 February 2022), better known as Henry Lincoln, was a British author, television presenter, scriptwriter, and actor. He co-wrote three Doctor Who multi-part serials in the 1960s, and — starting in the 1970s — inspired three Chronicle BBC Two documentaries on the alleged mysteries surrounding the French village of Rennes-le-Château (on which he was writer and presenter) — and, from the 1980s, co-authored and authored a series of books of which The Holy Blood and the Holy Grail was the most popular, becoming the inspiration for Dan Brown's 2003 best-selling novel, The Da Vinci Code. He was the last living person to have written for Doctor Who in the 1960s.

== Early career ==
Lincoln was born in London in 1930 and studied acting at the Royal Academy of Dramatic Art. Under his original name of Henry Soskin, he worked as both screenwriter and supporting actor. In 1964 he wrote one of the episodes of The Barnstormers (Associated-Rediffusion), as well as starring in two of the episodes. Lincoln also appeared in other television series such as The Avengers (1961, 1963), The Saint (1967), Man in a Suitcase (1968), and The Champions (1969); as well as in the 1968 film Don't Raise the Bridge, Lower the River.

He was co-writer, with Mervyn Haisman, of three Doctor Who stories starring Patrick Troughton: The Abominable Snowmen (1967), The Web of Fear (1968) and The Dominators (1968) and retained the rights to the recurring character Brigadier Lethbridge-Stewart. Prior to his death in February 2022, he was the sole-surviving writer from the 1960s era of Doctor Who, following the death of Donald Tosh in December 2019.

Lincoln wrote and presented documentaries on other subjects such as The Man in the Iron Mask (Timewatch, 1988), Nostradamus, The Curse of the Pharaohs, and The Cathars (the latter three documentaries formed the television series Mysteries shown on the BBC during the 1980s).

== Rennes-le-Château ==
In 1969, while on holiday in the Cévennes, Lincoln happened to read Le Trésor Maudit de Rennes-le-Château (trans: The Accursed Treasure of Rennes-le-Château), a book by Gérard de Sède about an alleged hidden treasure. The book reproduced copies of Latin parchments that had been found by the parish priest of Rennes-le-Château, Bérenger Saunière, within a pillar inside his Romanesque church.

Inspired by what appeared to be secret codes hidden in the Latin text, Lincoln did some research about the parchments and a possible treasure, writing several books presenting his theories about the area. He presented three documentaries in the Chronicle series for BBC2: "The Lost Treasure of Jerusalem", shown in February 1972, "The Priest, the Painter and the Devil", shown in October 1974, and finally "The Shadow of the Templars", shown in November 1979.

One of the parchments (which was later shown to be a forgery, since the writing was written in modern French and not in 18th or 19th century French) involved a series of raised letters throughout its Latin text, spelling out a message: À Dagobert II Roi et à Sion est ce trésor et il est là mort (trans: "This treasure belongs to King Dagobert II and to Sion, and he is there dead"; or, "This treasure belongs to King Dagobert II and to Sion, and it is death").

This referred to the Merovingian king Dagobert II, who had been assassinated without a direct heir in the 7th century, thereby ending his branch of the dynasty. Later research, however, showed that de Sède's book had actually been written at the instigation of Pierre Plantard as part of an elaborate hoax to promote a society known as the Priory of Sion, and Plantard claimed to be descended from Dagobert II. Pierre Plantard died in 2000.

== The Holy Blood and the Holy Grail ==
Lincoln was best known for being one of the co-authors of the controversial 1982 best-seller The Holy Blood and the Holy Grail. During the mid-1970s, while Lincoln was lecturing at a summer school, he met Richard Leigh, an American fiction writer.

Leigh introduced him to Michael Baigent, a New Zealand photo-journalist who had been working on a project about the Knights Templar. The three discovered that they shared a common interest in the Knights Templar, and between them later developed a theory that Jesus Christ had started a bloodline that had later intermarried with the Frankish Merovingian royal dynasty.

The three of them took their theory on the road during the 1970s in a series of lectures that later developed into the 1982 book, The Holy Blood and the Holy Grail, which became a best-seller and popularised the hypothesis that Jesus had fathered a still extant and powerful bloodline (the true Holy Grail), and which was tied together by a set of fraudulent documents hinting at the existence of a secret society known as the Priory of Sion. The author Dan Brown later used these ideas as the basis of his novel The Da Vinci Code.

The book has been described as "a work thoroughly debunked by scholars and critics alike". Arthurian scholar Richard Barber has commented, "It would take a book as long as the original to refute and dissect The Holy Blood and the Holy Grail point by point: it is essentially a text which proceeds by innuendo, not by refutable scholarly debate".

== Dan Brown lawsuit ==
Some of the ideas presented in The Holy Blood and the Holy Grail, were incorporated in the best-selling American novel The Da Vinci Code, by Dan Brown. In March 2006, Baigent and Leigh filed a lawsuit in a British court against Brown's publisher, Random House, claiming copyright infringement.

On 7 April, High Court judge Peter Smith rejected the copyright-infringement claim, and Brown won the court case. Lincoln was not involved in the proceedings, reportedly due to illness. However, in the Channel Five documentary (10 May 2006) Revealed... The Man behind the Da Vinci Code, Lincoln stated that he did not wish to take part in the proceedings because the ideas brought forth in Holy Blood were not even original themselves, and Brown's actions could only be described as, "a bit naughty". An earlier novel, published in 1980, had already used the theme of a Jesus bloodline: The Dreamer of the Vine, by Liz Greene, sister of Lincoln's co-author Richard Leigh.

== Bornholm ==
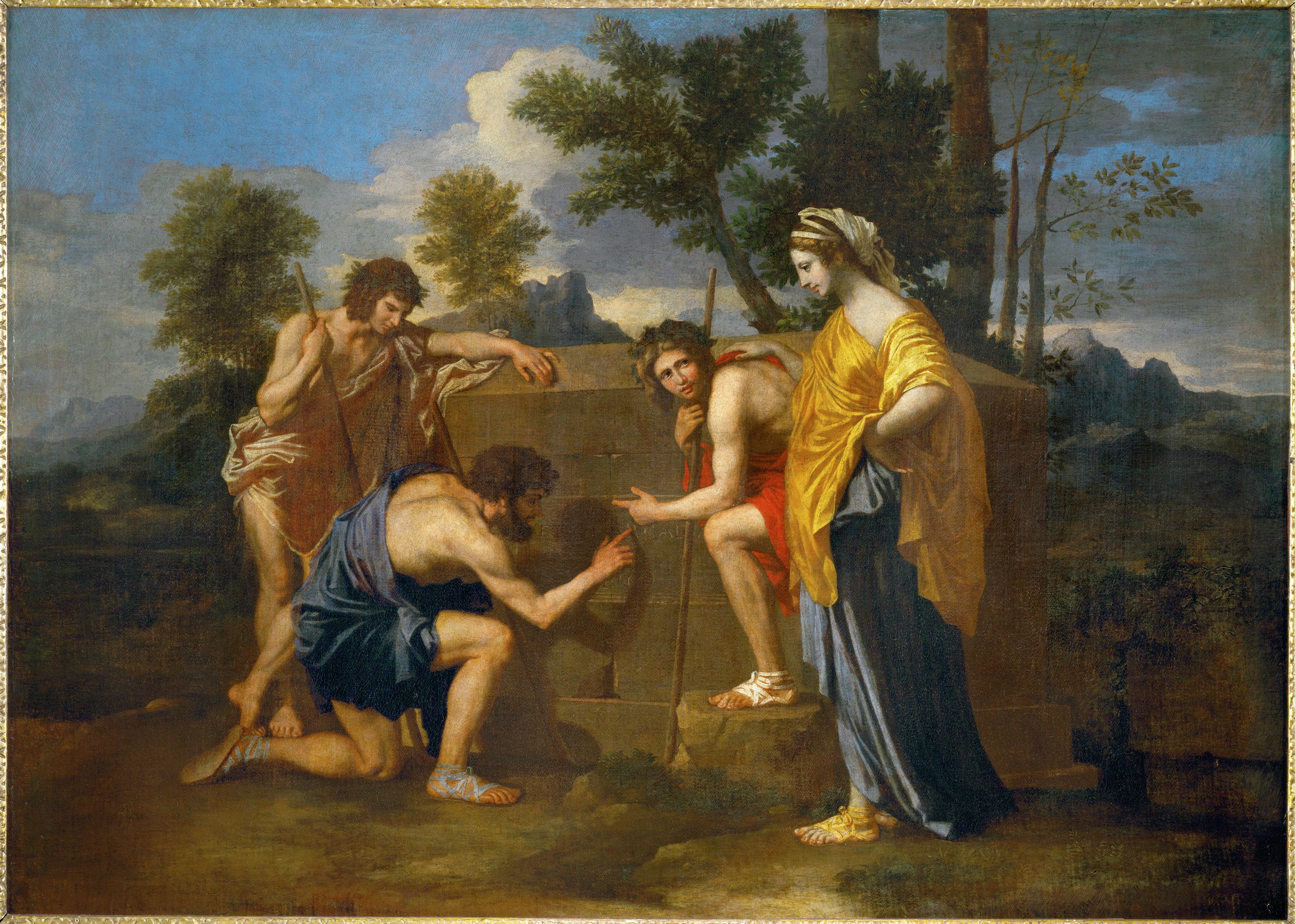
Les Bergers d'Arcadie by Nicolas Poussin

In 1993, Lincoln wrote and presented the four-episode TV-series The Secret which was produced and directed by Erling Haagensen.

The series presented elements of Lincoln's lifelong research on Rennes-le-Château, such as an alleged link between the area and the painting Les Bergers d'Arcadie by the 17th-century painter Nicolas Poussin. In 2000, Lincoln collaborated with Haagensen to write The Templar's Secret Island, linking their mutual hypotheses about geometry being observed in the placement of medieval churches around both Rennes-le-Château and the Danish island of Bornholm. These speculative findings led them to allege that the Knights Templar had built the churches on Bornholm in a specific pattern, to be used as a series of medieval astronomical observatories.

Sharan Newman, author of The Real History Behind The Templars, has noted that the history given in The Templar's Secret Island "is based on a few pieces of data and several assumptions that rely on inaccurate information", also adding that there are no records of Templar activity in Denmark.

Mainstream historians and specialists in medieval architecture believe that the four central-plan churches in Ny, Nylars, Ols and Østerlars in Bornholm were built as a result of the pilgrimages made by Sigurd I of Norway to the recaptured Jerusalem between 1107 and 1111.

Sharan Newman commented, "The idea of building a church in the form of the Church of the Holy Sepulchre in Jerusalem wasn't new. A hundred years before the Templar order was founded, the Benedictine church at Saint-Bénigne at Dijon was built with a round nave in imitation of the Holy Sepulchre. Even the Hospitallers built round churches."

== "Militi Templi Scotia" ==
On 8 November 2003, Lincoln was awarded an Honorary Knighthood in the Militi Templi Scotia order, in recognition of his work in the fields of sacred geometry and Templar history.

A description of Lincoln's ceremony of knighthood can be found in Rat Scabies and The Holy Grail by Christopher Dawes, a gonzo-style book about Rennes-le-Château in which Lincoln appears as a central character.

"Militi Templi Scotia ceased to exist in 2006 when a great majority of members left and started the Jacques de Molay 1314 Commandery in 2006, it then due to the membership rising became The Autonomous Grand Priory of Scotland in 2009 as the membership rose to the required numbers allowing it to do so."

== Personal life and death ==
Lincoln died in Rennes-les-Bains on 23 February 2022, at the age of 92.

== Works ==
- 1950s television series:
  - Our Mutual Friend (as Bob Gliddery)
- 1960s television series:
  - Strange Concealments (as Ambrose Lemmon)
  - Sierra Nine (as King Sharifa)
  - Maigret (guest actor)
  - The Secret of the Nubian Tomb (as The Omda)
  - The Avengers (guest actor)
  - No Hiding Place (guest actor)
  - The Saint (guest actor)
  - The Champions (guest actor)
  - Man in a Suitcase (guest actor)
  - Emergency Ward 10 (screenwriter)
- 1970s television series
  - L'homme sans visage (credited as Henry Soskin, in the role of professeur Pétri, 1975; adaptation of the 1974 film Nuits rouges, also credited as Henry Soskin, with the same cast, released in English called Shadowman, credited as Henry Lincoln; both television series and film directed by Georges Franju)
- Co-writer, with Mervyn Haisman, of three Doctor Who stories
  - The Abominable Snowmen
  - The Web of Fear
  - The Dominators
- Co-writer, with Mervyn Haisman, of the Boris Karloff film, Curse of the Crimson Altar, directed by Vernon Sewell (1968).
- Three BBC2 Chronicle documentaries about Rennes-le-Château, written and presented by Henry Lincoln.
  - The Lost Treasure of Jerusalem...?, 31 March 1972 (directed by Andrew Maxwell-Hyslop, produced by Paul Johnstone)
  - The Priest, the Painter, and the Devil, 30 October 1974, repeated in 1979 (produced by Roy Davies)
  - The Shadow of the Templars, 27 November 1979 (co-written by Michael Baigent, Richard Leigh, Anthony Wall and Jania MacGillivray; produced by Roy Davies)
- 1982: The Holy Blood and the Holy Grail (with Michael Baigent and Richard Leigh)
- 1987: The Messianic Legacy (with Michael Baigent and Richard Leigh)
- 1991: The Holy Place: Discovering the Eighth Wonder of the Ancient World (or The Holy Place: Decoding the Mystery of Rennes-le-Château or The Holy Place: Saunière and the Decoding of the Mystery of Rennes-le-Château)
- 1993: The Secret: 4-part documentary written and presented for Tv2 Danmark (later released on video and DVD)
- 2002: Key to the Sacred Pattern: The Untold Story of Rennes-le-Château
- 2002: The Templars' Secret Island: The Knights, The Priest and The Treasure (with Erling Haagensen)
- 2002: Henry Lincoln's Guide To Rennes-Le-Château And The Aude Valley video
- 2005: Origins of The Da Vinci Code DVD (with Erling Haagensen)

== Sources ==
- Secret Knowledge
- Rennes le Chateau FAQ – Interview with Lincoln
- Behind the Da Vinci Code, 2006 History Channel video documentary primarily about Lincoln's involvement. Produced and directed by Ian Bremner
- "The Priory of Sion", 30 April 2006 segment on 60 Minutes
- Henry Lincoln at IMDb
