= Robert Charroux =

French esoteric writer

Robert Joseph Grugeau, best known by his pen name Robert Charroux (April 7, 1909 – June 24, 1978), was a French author known for his writings on the ancient astronaut theme.

== Career ==
Charroux worked for the French post office and wrote eight works of fiction between 1942 and 1946 using the pseudonym Saint-Saviol. He also wrote the scripts for a French comic strip, Atomas, about an atomic-powered superhero, appearing in the weekly magazine Mon Journal in the late 1940s. For the same magazine Charroux wrote a science fiction adventure in serial form, "Prof. Barthelemy's Flying Island." He first began using the pseudonym Charroux in 1942, that became his regular pseudonym from 1962 onwards.

Robert Charroux married Yvette Bernuchot in April 1930. It has been said that they lived on rue St Sulpice in Paris during the late 1950s, however it is unclear whether this is a coincidence or error: they did in fact live on Rue St Sulpice in the village of Charroux in the Vienne for a number of years and there is a plaque attesting to this on the walls of the now derelict building.

In 1976 he began making plans to be buried in the cemetery of Charroux.

== Ancient astronauts ==
Charroux was a pioneer of the theory of ancient astronauts, publishing at least six non-fiction works in this genre in the last decade of his life, including One Hundred Thousand Years of Man's Unknown History (1963, 1971), Legacy of the Gods (1964, 1974), Masters of the World (1967, 1974), The Gods Unknown (1969, 1974) and Forgotten Worlds (1969, 1973).

The influence that Charroux's first work (in its 1963 version) had on Erich Von Däniken's first books (ca. 1966), as well as the influence that Von Däniken's early books had on Charroux, is widely appreciated, but Von Däniken seems to have been equally familiar with an earlier French work, The Morning of the Magicians by Louis Pauwels and Jacques Bergier (1960), which is likely to have been a direct inspiration for both Charroux and Von Däniken. Charroux's publisher contacted Von Däniken's in March 1968 concerning evidence of plagiarism, with the result that later printings of Chariots of the Gods and Return to the Stars at least mentioned Charroux in the bibliography.

Charroux's theories concerning Ancient Astronauts were criticised by French archaeologist Jean-Pierre Adam in 1975. His works have been described as pseudohistory.

== Other views ==
Some see his works as examples of Celticism. Celticism, similar to Nordicism, was a popular Nationalistic movement in France and Celtic countries in the early 20th century. He suggested in his book Lost Worlds: Scientific Secrets of the Ancients, that the Mayans and ancient Peruvians were ancient Celtic migrants. According to Charroux, the candle stick of the Andes and the Nasca Lines were created by a pre-Celtic civilization, perhaps the same as those who created the Long Man of Wilmington of Sussex in England. He also related the white skinned Gods mentioned in the Popul Vuh to ancient Celts from Hyperborea.

Writing in his book Lost Worlds Charroux rejected evolution, instead he argued for human devolution. Charroux claimed that man is regressing and was superior in the past; he claimed that "Atlantis and Mu are not dreams of spiritualists, but realities of a mysterious era". He further explained that the Atlantans and Hyperboreans were the ancestors of modern humans, and the first humans on earth were originally aliens.

Unlike most ancient astronaut writers, Charroux took a large interest in racialism. According to Charroux, Hyperborea was situated between Iceland and Greenland and was the home of a Nordic White race with blonde hair and blue eyes. Charroux claimed that this race was extraterrestrial in origin and had originally come from a cold planet situated far from the sun. Charroux also claimed that the White race of the Hyperboreans and their ancestors the Celts had dominated the whole world in the ancient past. Some of these beliefs have influenced Esoteric Nazism such as the work of Miguel Serrano.

== Rennes-le-Château ==
Robert Charroux developed an active interest in the alleged treasure of Rennes-le-Château, following up claims made by Noel Corbu in the local press in 1956 that it was discovered by Bérenger Saunière during the late 19th century. In 1958, with his wife Yvette and Denise Carvenne, member of The Treasure Seekers' Club (that he founded in 1951), he scanned the village and its church for treasure using a metal detector. Charroux also distributed a leaflet about this entitled L’ébouriffante histoire du "curé aux milliards" that has not survived, but is referred to in French newspapers of the period. He described his activities there in his 1962 book Trésors du Monde enterrés, emmurés, engloutis (Fayard) that was published in English in 1967.

== Publications ==
- Trésors du monde (1962) – Treasures of the World (Frederick Muller Limited, 1967)
- Histoire inconnue des hommes depuis cent mille ans (1963) – One Hundred Thousand Years Of Man's Unknown History (Berkley Publishing Corporation, 1971)
- Le Livre des secrets trahis (1964) – Legacy of the Gods (Berkley Publishing Corporation, 1974)
- Le Livre des maîtres du monde (1967) – Masters of the World (Berkley Publishing Corporation, 1974)
- Le Livre du mystérieux inconnu (1969) – The Mysterious Unknown (Corgi Books, London, 1973, originally published by Neville Spearman Limited, London, 1972, later in 1974 republished by the Berkley Publishing Corporation with the Neville Spearman translation again though under the title The Gods Unknown)
- Le Livre des mondes oubliés (1969) – Forgotten Worlds (Popular Library, 1973, the same translation was republished in 1974 under the title Lost Worlds by Fontana Books, a London/Glasgow imprint of Collins)
- Le Livre du passé mystérieux (1973) – The Mysterious Past (Futura Publications, 1974, also translated and published under the same title in 1975 by the Berkley Publishing Corporation)
- L'Énigme des Andes (1974) – The Mysteries of the Andes (Avon, 1977)
- Archives des autres mondes (1977)
