= Villa Bethania =

Coordinates: 42°55′40″N 2°15′45″E

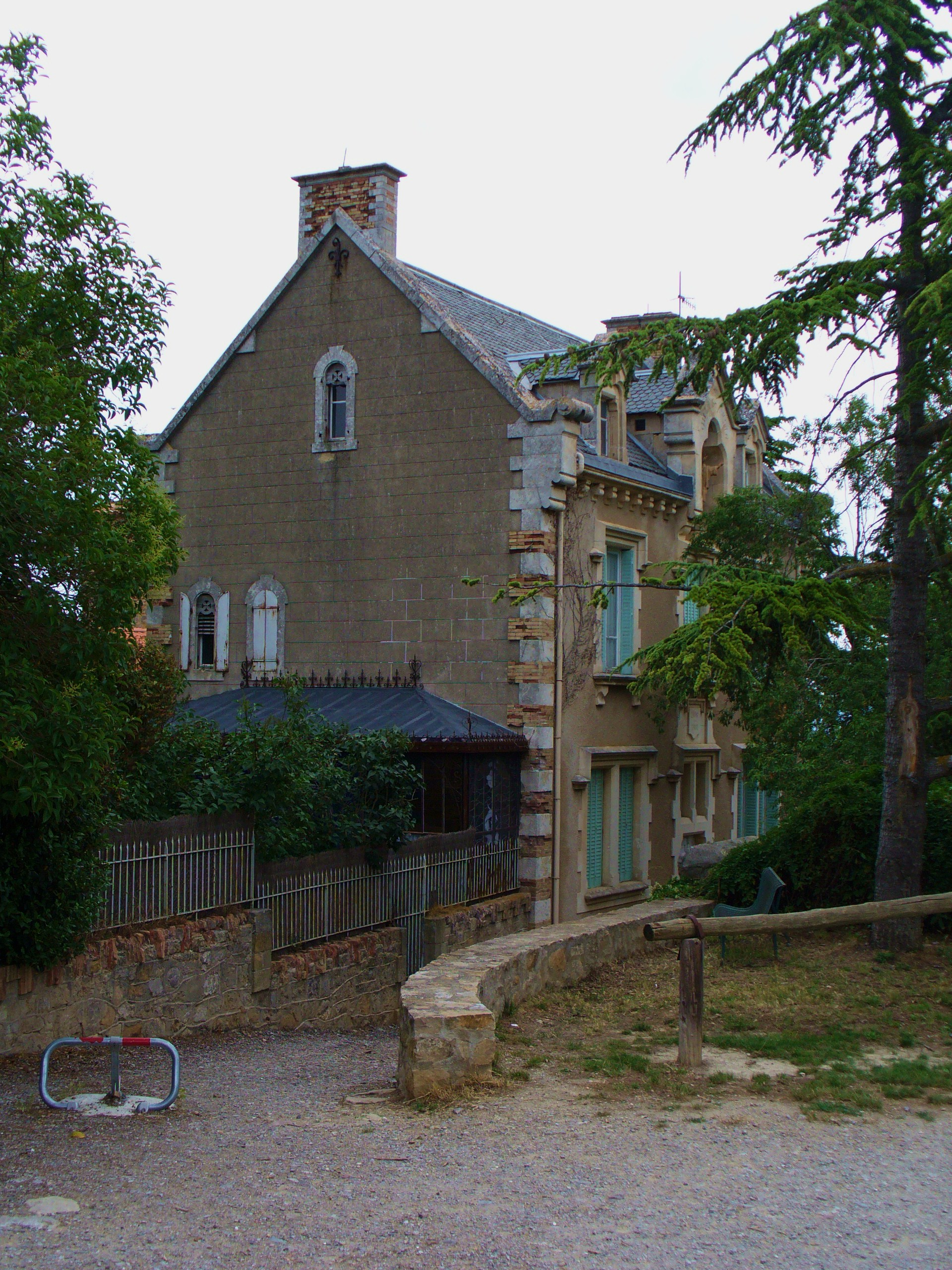
Villa Bethania

The Villa Bethania was constructed in the French village of Rennes-le-Château between 1901 and 1905 as part of the former estate of the Abbé Bérenger Saunière, in the name of his maidservant Marie Dénarnaud.

== History ==
Its foundation stone was laid on 3 June 1901 and building work was completed by May 1905. The architect was Tiburce Caminade of Limoux, the Master builder Elie Bot from Luc-sur-Aude, and the contractor in charge of building the roof was Joseph Fabre of Dourgne. Surviving receipts and existing account books belonging to Saunière reveal that the construction of his estate that included the Villa Bethania and the Tour Magdala (and purchases of land) between 1898 and 1905 cost 26,417 Francs.

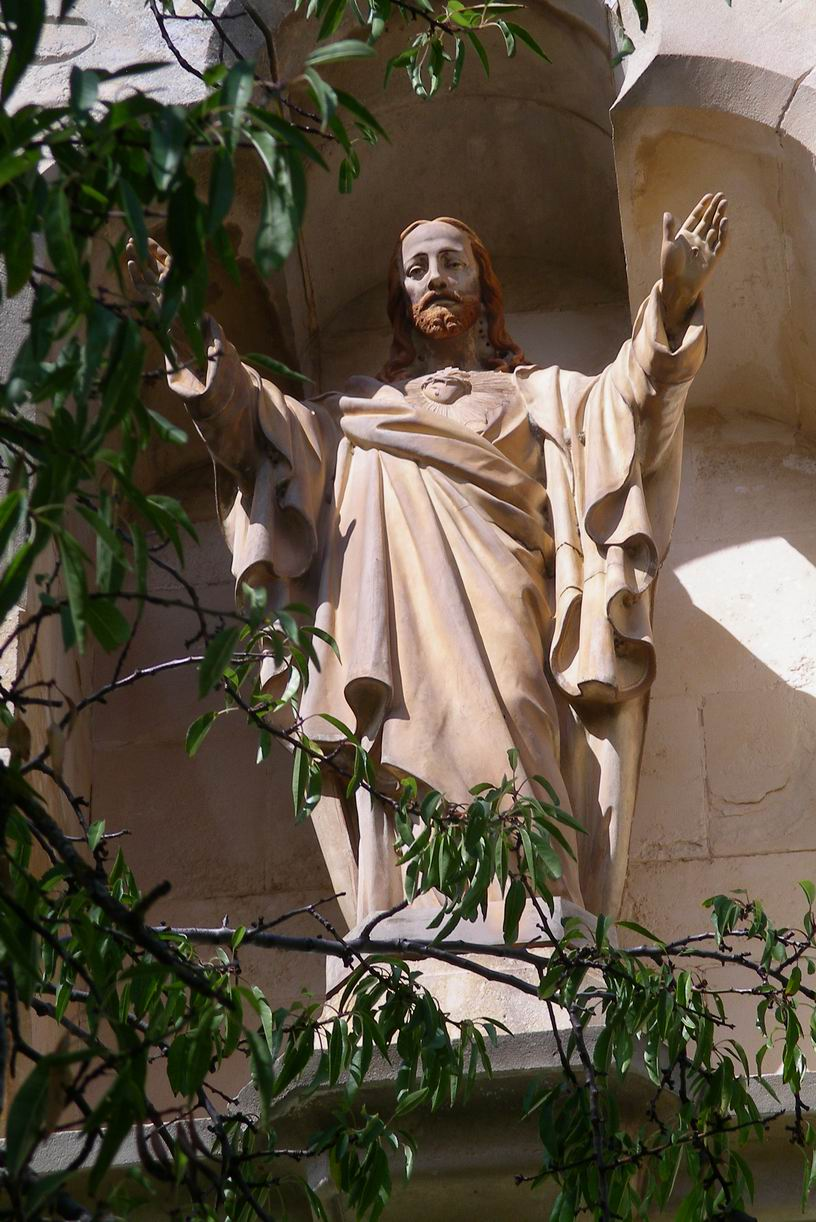
Sacred Heart statue of Jesus above the entrance to the Villa Bethania

The interior of the Villa Bethania is decorated with religious symbolism that includes a terracotta statue version of Murillo's painting Assumption of the Virgin, a figurine of the Infant Jesus of Prague, a painting of Thérèse of Lisieux (also known as Thérèse of the Child Jesus) and a painted copy of a tapestry by the artist Alphonse Mucha. Stained glass windows depicting symbolism of the Sacred Heart complement the Sacred Heart statue of Jesus Christ situated above the entrance to the Villa.

Saunière stated during his ecclesiastical trial that it was intended as a home for retired priests.

== Private chapel ==
In January 1909 the bishop of Carcassonne transferred Saunière to the village of Coustouge. Saunière refused the nomination and resigned. He remained in Rennes-le-Château - in 1910 building a special conservatory by the side of the Villa Bethania that served as a Private Chapel, containing an Altar where he continued to celebrate Mass - obtaining his religious materials from Pascal Faraco of Carcassonne, who dealt with religious items that had previously belonged to French priests that had been expelled from the country.

== For sale ==
Bérenger Saunière first considered selling the Villa Bethania in 1910 through Real estate agent Louis Auran of Béziers. In November 1911 Saunière began negotiating the sale through the Parisian Banque Petitjean during the final stages of his ecclesiastical trial that resulted in his suspension from the priesthood on 5 December 1911. Surviving correspondence belonging to Saunière reveals his estate was valued at 18,000 Francs by the Crédit Foncier de France in 1913.

Following Saunière's death in 1917, Marie Dénarnaud received permission from the local commune to continue living in the Presbytery and she put the Villa Bethania up for sale again - for an exaggerated asking price of 200,000 Francs, as suggested by Abbé Eugène Grassaud on 10 May 1918 - she found herself in trouble unable to pay the French property taxes, and was forced to borrow money from friends over a period of decades until Noël Corbu became its owner in 1946, and who settled all her personal financial debts. This was the first time the Villa Bethania became occupied.

== Hotel and restaurant ==
During Easter 1955, the Villa Bethania was turned it into a Hotel by Noël Corbu who called it the Hotel de la Tour. Corbu also opened a restaurant in rooms underneath the belvedere that connected the Tour Magdala to the orangery (also installing windows). It was during this time that Corbu began circulating the story that Bérenger Saunière discovered the treasure of Blanche of Castile. Corbu's story attracted custom and later achieved national fame through articles in the press, eventually catching the attention of Pierre Plantard and inspiring the 1967 book L'Or de Rennes by Gérard de Sède.

Since 2000, the Villa Bethania has been the property of the local Municipal council of Rennes-le-Château.
