= Montazels =

Commune in Occitanie, France

- Commune
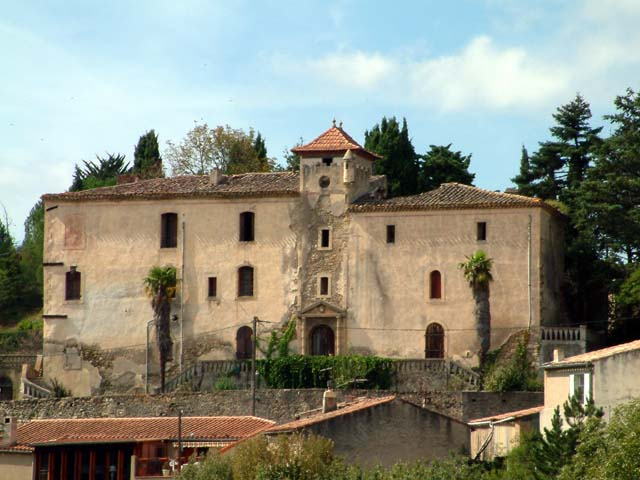
- The chateau in Montazels

- Coat of arms
- Location of Montazels
- Location within France Location within Occitanie
- Coordinates: 42°56′46″N 2°14′48″E
- Country: France
- Region: Occitania
- Department: Aude
- Arrondissement: Limoux
- Canton: La Haute-Vallée de l'Aude

Government
  - Mayor (2020–2026): Christophe Cuxac
- Area^{1}: 4.39 km^{2} (1.69 sq mi)
- Elevation: 235 m (771 ft)
- Highest elevation: 527 m (1,729 ft)
- Lowest elevation: 211 m (692 ft)
- Population (2023): 528
  - Density: 120/km^{2} (312/sq mi)
- Time zone: UTC+01:00 (CET)
  - Summer (DST): UTC+02:00 (CEST)
- INSEE/Postal code: 11240 /11190
- ^{1} French Land Register data, which excludes lakes, ponds, glaciers > 1 km^{2} (0.386 sq mi or 247 acres) and river estuaries.

Montazels (French pronunciation: [mɔ̃tazɛl]; Occitan: Montasèls) is a commune in the Aude department in the Occitanie region of France.

== Population ==
Historical population
Year	Pop.	±% p.a.
1968	399	—
1975	459	+2.02%
1982	462	+0.09%
1990	506	+1.14%
1999	469	−0.84%
2007	489	+0.52%
2012	577	+3.36%
2017	560	−0.60%
2023	528	−0.98%
Source: INSEE

== Personalities ==
Bérenger Saunière, controversial Roman Catholic priest of Rennes-le-Château, was born in Montazels on 11 April 1852.

== See also ==
- Communes of the Aude department
