= Bérenger Saunière =

French priest

The Rev. François-Bérenger Saunière
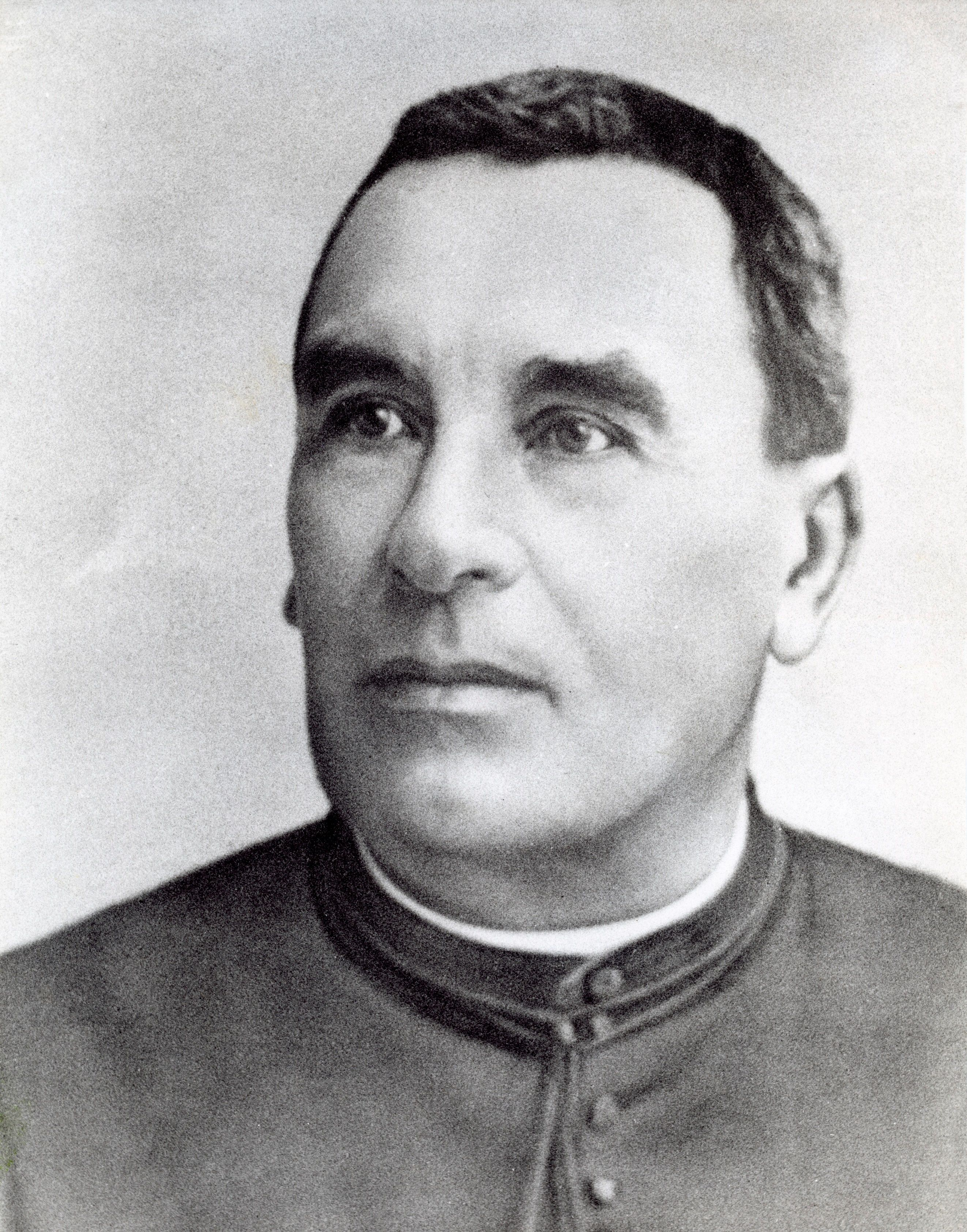

Personal life
- Born: 11 April 1852 Montazels, Aude, France
- Died: 22 January 1917 (aged 64) Rennes-le-Château, Aude, France

Religious life
- Religion: Roman Catholic

François-Bérenger Saunière (11 April 1852 – 22 January 1917) was a French Catholic priest in the village of Rennes-le-Château, in the Aude region. He was a central figure in the conspiracy theories surrounding the village, which form the basis of several documentaries and books such as the 1982 The Holy Blood and the Holy Grail by Michael Baigent, Richard Leigh, and Henry Lincoln. Elements of these theories were later used by Dan Brown in his best-selling 2003 novel The Da Vinci Code, in which the fictional character Jacques Saunière is named after the priest.

Saunière served in Rennes-le-Château from 1885 until he was transferred to another village in 1909 by his bishop. He declined this nomination and subsequently resigned. From 1909 until his death in 1917, he was a non-stipendiary Free Priest (an independent priest without a parish, who did not receive any salary from the church because of suspension), and who from 1910 celebrated Mass at an altar constructed in a special conservatory by his Villa Bethania. Saunière's refusal to leave Rennes-le-Château to continue his priesthood in another parish incurred permanent suspension. The epitaph on Saunière's original 1917 gravestone read "priest of Rennes-le-Château 1885-1917".

== Early life ==
François Bérenger Saunière was born on 11 April 1852 in Montazels, in the Arrondissement of Limoux of the Aude region. He was the eldest of seven children, having three brothers (Alfred, Martial, and Joseph) and three sisters (Mathilde, Adeline, and Marie-Louise). He was the son of Marguerite Hugues and Joseph Saunière (1823–1906), also called "cubié", who was the mayor of Montazels (Aude), managed the local flour mill, and was the steward of Marquis de Cazermajou's castle. Alfred became a priest; Joseph wanted to be a physician but died at 25. Saunière went to school at St. Louis in Limoux, entered the seminary in Carcassonne in 1874, and was ordained as a priest in June, 1879.

== Ministry ==
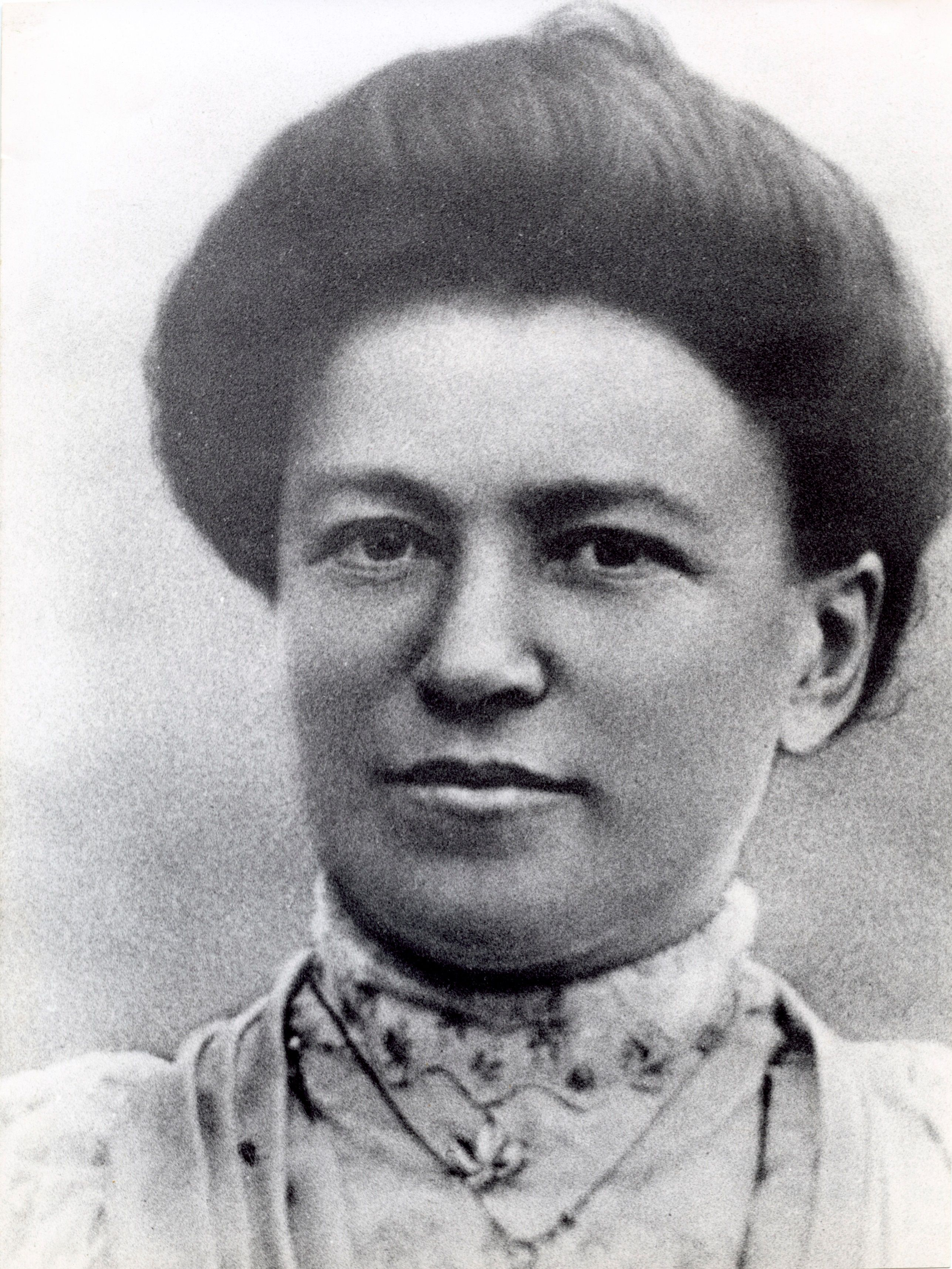
Marie Dénarnaud

From 16 July 1879 until 1882, Saunière was the vicar of Alet. From June 1882 to 1885, he was a priest in the deanery of the small village of Clat. He was a teacher in the seminary in Narbonne but, because he was undisciplined, on 1 June 1885 he was appointed to another small village of approximately 300 inhabitants, to Rennes-le-Château with its church dedicated to Saint Mary Magdalene.

For preaching anti-republican sermons from his pulpit during the elections of October 1885, Saunière was suspended by the French Minister of Religion. Between 1 December 1885 and July 1886 he resumed lessons in the seminary of Narbonne. As the villagers wanted him back, the prefect of the Aude reinstated Saunière. Between 1890 and 1891 he also said Mass on Sundays in Antugnac. Marie Dénarnaud, his maidservant, moved into the Presbytery at Rennes-le-Château with her family in 1890.

Claims that Bérenger Saunière had an ambiguous relationship with his maidservant, Marie Dénarnaud, are without foundation. Saunière himself outlined the following principles for dealing with a maidservant:

Respect, but not familiarity. Not to permit her to talk about matters of his ministry. What you say to a servant should not be able to be said to other women. She must avoid excesses of language, and he must not trust in her age or her piety too easily. She is not to enter the bedroom when he is in bed, except in case of illnesses.

=== Mission 1891 ===
An important part of Saunière's ministry at Rennes-le-Château was the installation and Blessing of the statue of Our Lady of Lourdes on 21 June 1891, commemorating the First Holy Communion of 24 children of the parish and "to bring to a close the spiritual exercises of the retreat that had been preached by the Reverend Father Ferrafiat, diocesan missionary, of the Family of Saint Vincent de Paul, residing at Notre Dame de Marseille" (the church, based at Limoux, is dedicated to the Blessed Virgin Mary).

A 'Visigothic pillar' acted as a plinth for the statue bearing the inscriptions Mission 1891 and Penitence! Penitence!. Its authenticity is the subject of much debate. Saunière claimed it was one of two pillars that supported the original church altar. A genuine Visigothic pillar resembling the one installed by Saunière is displayed in the museum of Narbonne. The pillar that originally supported the statue of Our Lady of Lourdes was transferred into the Saunière museum in 1993 because of erosion and decay and was replaced by a resin replica.

=== Church renovations ===
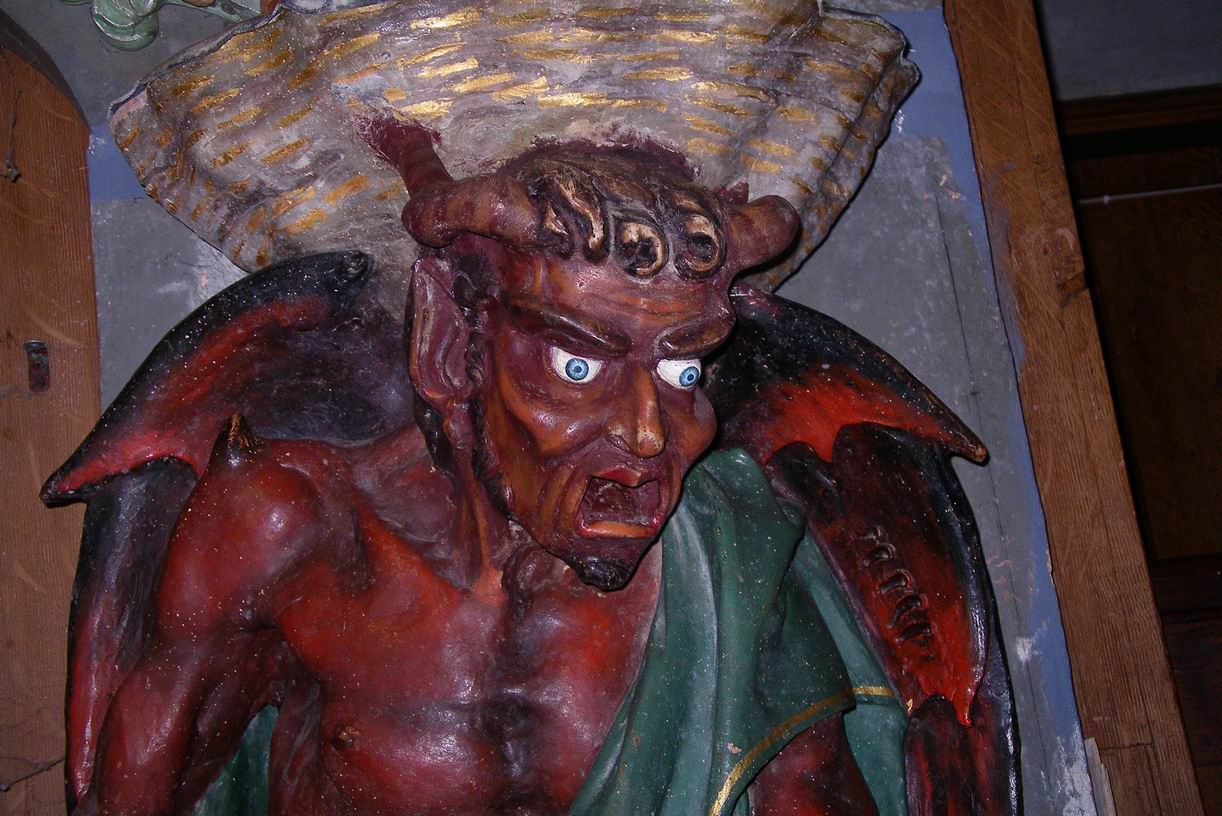
Statue of the Devil supporting the Holy Water Stoup

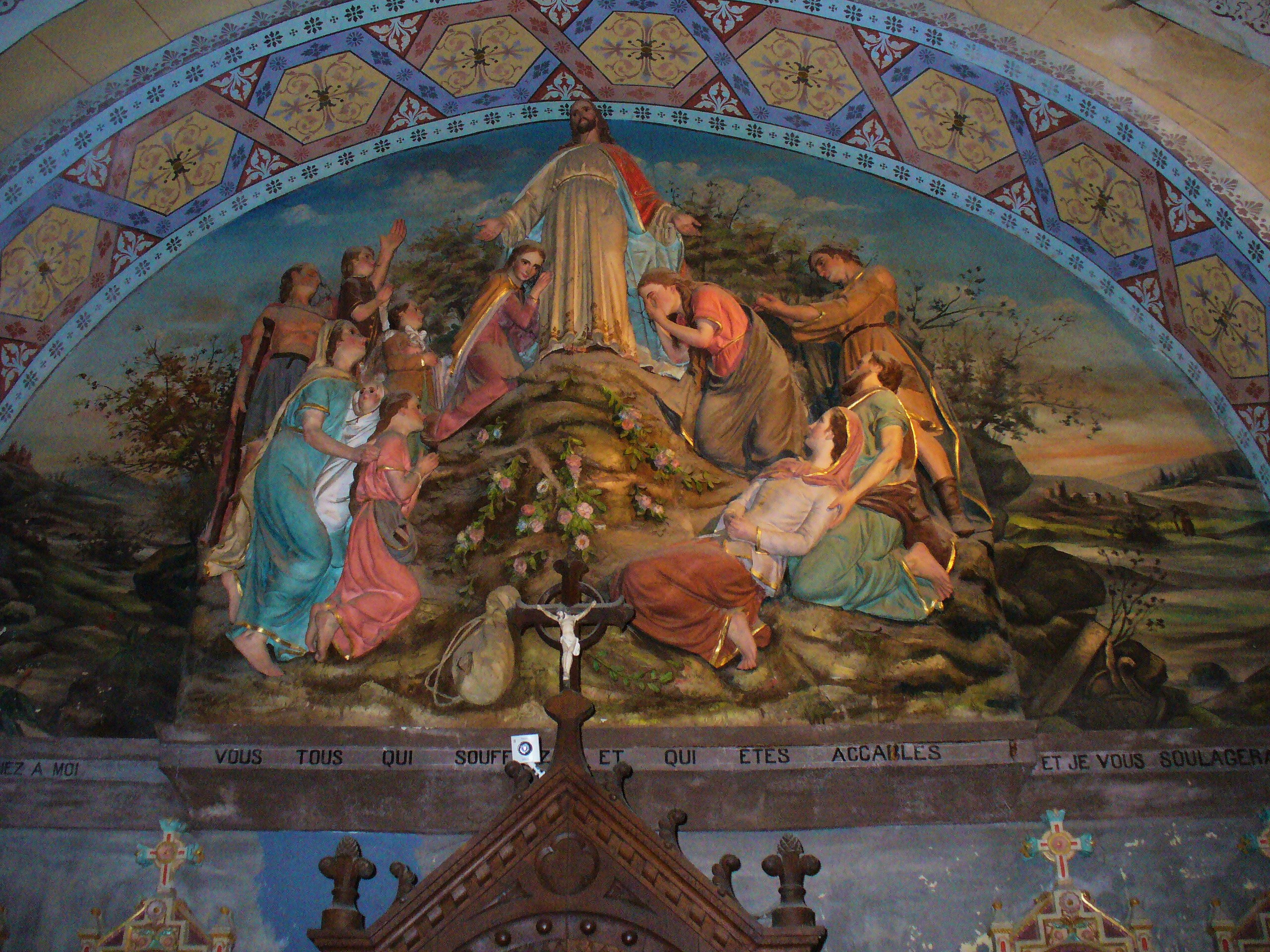
Bas-relief of Jesus giving the Sermon on the Mount

The presbytery was one of several building projects Saunière launched around the village. He renovated the interior and exterior of the local church, as recommended by the architect Guiraud Cals in his report dated 1853. A receipt dated 5 June 1887 shows the first renovations involved the re-flooring of the church. A new altar to the value of 700 francs was donated by a wealthy benefactress of monarchist persuasion, Mme Marie Cavailhé, in July 1887. New stained-glass windows were fitted that cost 1,350 francs, which Saunière settled in three installments – April 1897, April 1899, and January 1900.

In November 1896 Saunière commissioned the prestigious sculptor and painter Giscard of Toulouse (established in 1855) to decorate his church with new statues of the saints, Stations of the Cross, baptismal font with statues of John baptising Jesus (bearing Ecce Agnus Dei), a bas-relief of Jesus giving the Sermon on the Mount above the confessional, and a figure of a Devil supporting a holy water stoup surmounted by angels making the sign of the cross, bearing the inscriptions BS and Par Ce Signe Tu Le Vaincras ("By this sign you will conquer him"). All these items were chosen by Saunière from Giscard's catalogue. Although the 1896 edition of Giscard's catalogue has not survived, and later catalogues omit the statue of the Devil, its head bears a resemblance to the one found on the statue of the dragon being vanquished by Saint Michael that was also made by Giscard. The total sum involved was 2,500 francs, paid in annual instalments of 500 francs by Saunière beginning at the end of December 1897.

Following Sauniere's renovations and redecoratations, the church was re-dedicated on the feast of Pentecost 1897 by his bishop, Monsignor Billard.

=== Construction of the estate ===
Saunière built a grand estate between the years 1898 and 1905 that also involved buying several plots of land. This included the Renaissance-style Villa Bethania, the Tour Magdala (that he used as his personal library) connected to an orangery by a belvedere with rooms underneath, a garden with a pool and a cage for monkeys – all in the name of his maidservant, Marie Dénarnaud.

== Ecclesiastical trials, punishment and suspension ==
Saunière's renovation of his church and ostentatious construction programmes in a small hilltop village could not go unnoticed, and this attracted hostile reactions, with various complaints passed on by various sources to the Bishopric of Carcassonne. In 1899, Saunière purchased a clergymen's directory (Annuaire du clergé français) through which he contacted both priests and religious communities across France to solicit Mass requests. The bishopric had warned Saunière about his selling of Masses, and had sent him two written warnings in May 1901. These written warnings were repeated in June 1903 and August 1904.

Monsignor Paul-Félix Beuvain de Beauséjour was appointed the new Bishop of Carcassonne in 1902. He initially transferred Saunière to the village of Coustouge in January 1909. Saunière refused the nomination and resigned on 28 January 1909, becoming a free priest. Then on 27 May 1910 Monsignor Beauséjour decided to conduct an ecclesiastical investigation and drew up an official Bill of Indictment referring to:

- Trafficking in Masses,
- Disobedience to the bishop,
- Exaggerated and unjustified expenditure to which fees from Masses that have not been said seem to have been devoted.

Saunière had to attend an ecclesiastical trial to answer these charges.

=== First two hearings ===
Saunière did not attend the first hearing on 16 July 1910 nor on the rescheduled date 23 July when he was sentenced in his absence: he incurred a one-month suspension and was ordered to refund the money he had obtained from selling Masses. He also did not attend the second hearing on 23 August, but managed to attend on the rescheduled date 5 November 1910, when he was sentenced "to withdraw to a house of priestly retreat or into a monastery of his choice, there to undertake spiritual exercises for a period of ten days" for trafficking in Masses and for accepting more money than he was able to say Masses for. He served his penance in the monastery of Prouille.

On 17 December 1910, Saunière unsuccessfully appealed to the Sacred Congregation of The Council in Rome for his reinstatement as parish priest of Rennes-le-Château; this information was passed on to the Carcassonne Bishopric. The bishop issued a strong warning against Saunière in 1911, forbidding him to administer the sacraments, published in La Semaine religieuse de Carcassonne dated 3 February 1911 and in La Croix dated 9 February 1911.

The bishopric was not satisfied and by formal command asked Saunière to produce his account books by 2 March at the latest, in a letter dated 18 February 1911. A Commission of Enquiry was established to further scrutinize Saunière's financial activities.

On 13 March 1911, Saunière submitted 61 invoices relating to the renovation of his church and the building of his estate that came to the total of 36,250 francs. On 25 March 1911 he submitted a letter of explanation to the bishopric outlining the source of his finances, with a List of Donors giving details of his entire income since becoming priest of Rennes-le-Château, producing an exaggerated amount totaling 193,150 francs. In a letter dated 14 July 1911 Saunière provided a statement of expenditure on the renovation of his church and building of his estate, producing an exaggerated amount totaling 193,050 francs (claiming the Villa Bethania cost 90,000 francs, and the Tour Magdala 40,000 francs).

On 4 October, the Commission of Enquiry submitted its report: only about 36,000 francs could be accounted for out of the 193,050 francs that Saunière claimed to have spent, and commented that Saunière refused to cooperate with the enquiry. Another hearing had to be arranged where Saunière had to produce his account books for inspection by the bishopric.

=== Third hearing ===
Saunière did not attend the third hearing on 21 November 1911 and was sentenced in his absence on 5 December 1911 to three months' suspension. His reinstatement depended on the ecclesiastical judgement that he had to "undertake the restitution into the hands of the rightful owner and according to canon law of the goods misappropriated by him", which the priest was unable to do.

== Later years ==
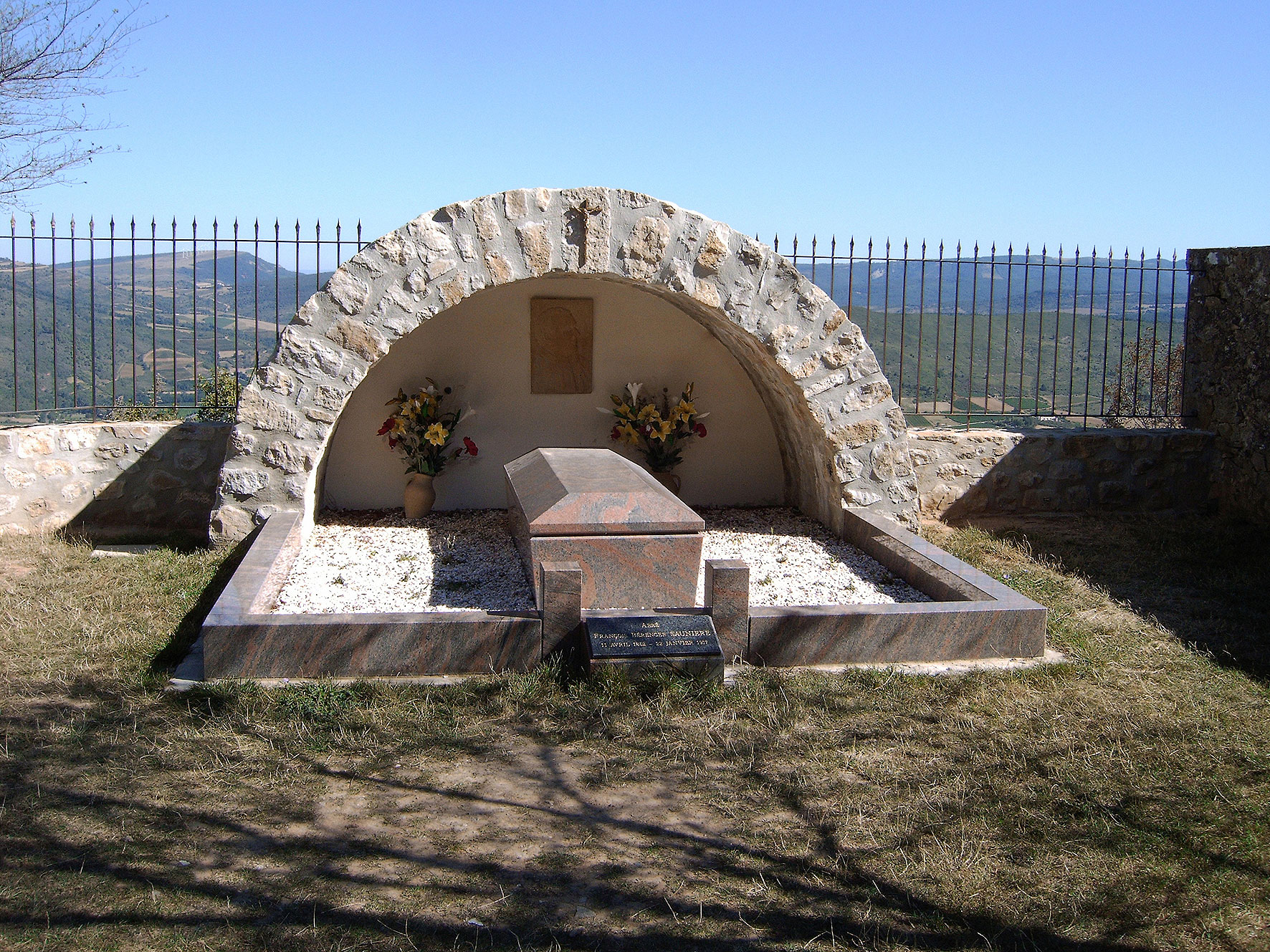
Saunière's Grave in Rennes-le-Château

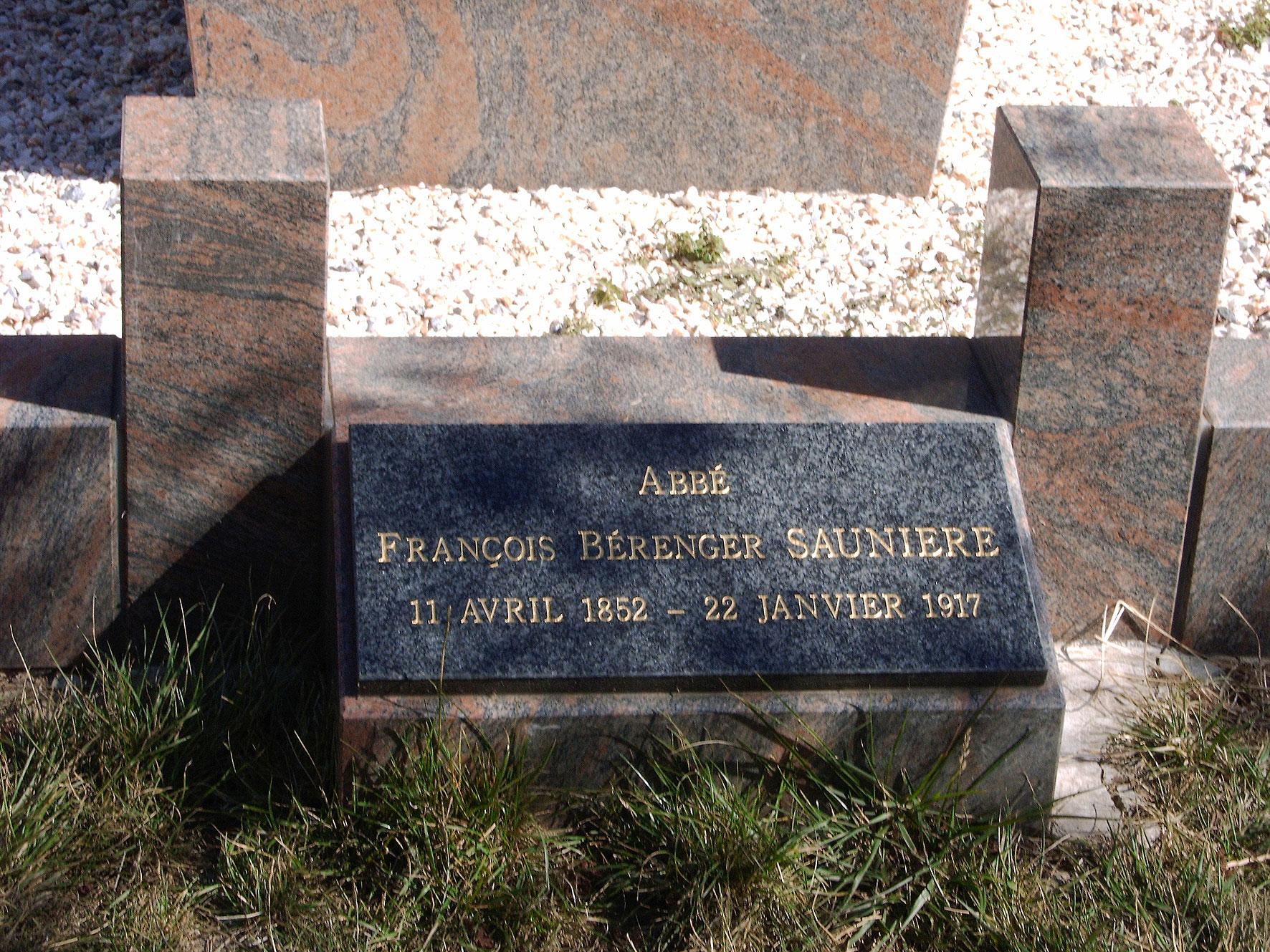
Plaque on Saunière's Grave

Following the ecclesiastical trial, Saunière lived the rest of his life in poverty, selling religious medals and rosaries to wounded soldiers who were stationed in Campagne-les-Bains.

Whatever money Saunière was still raising from selling Masses was used on his appeal to Rome that his lawyer, Abbé Jean-Eugène Huguet (doctor of canon law), was working on. In May 1914, Saunière planned to build a summer house, but abandoned the project because he could not afford the 2,500 francs required.

François Bérenger Saunière died on 22 January 1917, his suspension lifted at the moment of death (in articulo mortis) by Abbé Jean Rivière, who performed the last rites. His death certificate dated 23 January 1917 was signed by Victor Rivière, the mayor of Rennes-le-Château. Saunière was buried on 24 January 1917. Marie Dénarnaud paid for Saunière's coffin on 12 June 1917.

In September 2004, the mayor of Rennes-le-Château exhumed Saunière's corpse from the cemetery and reburied it in a concrete sarcophagus to protect it from grave-robbers. Since then, the cemetery of Rennes-le-Château has been closed to the general public.

== Controversy ==
The controversy around Saunière originally centred on parchments he is said to have found hidden in the old altar of his church, relating to the treasure of Blanche of Castile, the putative source of his income.

=== The popular story of Saunière's wealth ===
After opening his restaurant at Rennes-le-Château in the mid-1950s, Noël Corbu circulated the story that, in 1891, Saunière discovered parchments in the hollow pillar beneath his altar, and that these related to the treasure of Blanche of Castile. 'According to the archives' her treasure consisted of 28,500,000 gold pieces—the treasure of the French crown assembled by Blanche to pay the ransom of Saint Louis (a prisoner of the Egyptians during the Seventh Crusade) whose surplus she had hidden at Rennes-le-Château. Saunière had found only one part of it, so it was necessary to continue his investigations.

Corbu's story later achieved national fame through articles in the press, eventually catching the attention of Pierre Plantard and inspiring the 1967 book L'Or de Rennes by Gérard de Sède, which involved Plantard's unacknowledged collaboration.

The book contained elements relating to the fictitious secret society the Priory of Sion, reproducing "parchments" that alluded to the survival of the Merovingian line of Frankish kings from Dagobert II, and Plantard claimed to be descended from that monarch. Plantard and de Sède fell out over book royalties when L'Or de Rennes was published in 1967 and Plantard's friend Philippe de Chérisey revealed that he had fabricated the parchments.

=== The Holy Blood and the Holy Grail ===
In 1969, the English scriptwriter Henry Lincoln read the paperback version of L'Or de Rennes and then between 1972 and 1979 produced three BBC Two Chronicle documentaries on the subject matter. Lincoln was also directed to one of Plantard's planted documents, "Les Dossiers Secrets d'Henri Lobineau" in the Bibliothèque Nationale in Paris. Later, Lincoln teamed up with two other authors, and co-wrote the 1982 book The Holy Blood and the Holy Grail (published in the USA as Holy Blood, Holy Grail). Unaware they were relying on forged documents as a source, they stated as a fact that the Priory of Sion had existed. The Holy Blood and the Holy Grail claimed that Saunière possibly found evidence that Jesus of Nazareth and Mary Magdalene were married, and produced offspring that eventually became the Merovingian dynasty. The authors speculated that Saunière engaged in financial transactions with a man they claimed was Archduke Johann Salvator of Austria, and Saunière could have been the representative of the Priory of Sion, and his income could have originated from the Vatican "which might have been subjected to high-level political blackmail by both Sion and the Habsburgs". The book was an international bestseller, inspiring Dan Brown's best-selling novel The Da Vinci Code.

Hypotheses surrounding Saunière have proliferated over the last few decades, as different authors elaborate on the story of the priest's activities and discoveries in and around his church during its 1887 renovations.

=== The actual source of Saunière's wealth ===
The first scholarly book on Saunière's activities was by a local historian and chief librarian of Carcassonne, René Descadeillas, who sifted through the priest's account books and personal correspondence, as well as the records of Saunière's ecclesiastical trial lodged in the Carcassonne Bishopric. He concluded in his 1974 Mythologie du trésor de Rennes: histoire véritable de l'abbé Saunière, curé de Rennes-le-Château that there never was any treasure or mystery; all of the priest's wealth was generated from selling Masses and accepting donations. This conclusion was shared by the local priest and author Abbé Bruno de Monts, who himself contributed essential information during the 1980s and 1990s, as well as by other French authors such as Jean-Jacques Bedu and more recently David Rossoni.

The 2005 Channel 4 documentary The Real Da Vinci Code presented by Tony Robinson arrived at the same conclusion, followed by the 2006 CBS News 60 Minutes documentary Priory of Sion, presented by Ed Bradley: "The source of the wealth of the priest of Rennes-le-Château was not some ancient mysterious treasure, but good old fashioned fraud."

According to canon law, priests are ordinarily allowed to say one Mass per day, with permission regularly granted to say two or three on Sundays, solemnities, and feast days (although not in Saunière's time, with the exception of All Soul's Day and Christmas); however, they may accept a stipend or "Mass offering" for only one Mass per day. Saunière, however, had been soliciting and accepting money via the post to say thousands of Masses, charging one franc per Mass. Some clients would send payment for hundreds of Masses, which he never actually performed. The question of why clients should request masses from the impoverished priest of a rural church has not been pursued as enterprisingly.

Reviewing Descadeillas' Mythologie du trésor de Rennes in 1976, church historian Raymond Darricau commented: "To begin with there was nothing: Saunière was just a schemer. Today however we find ourselves confronted with a genuine esoteric construction: Rennes-le-Château has been promoted to the rank of ‘mystical capital’ of the Languedoc" and "the manner in which the myth of Rennes-le-Château has grown to its present status is certainly worthy of reflection and could perhaps provide someone with material for a dissertation on precisely how stories of this kind come into existence."

== Details of expenditure ==
Surviving receipts and existing account books belonging to Saunière, preserved by his servant Marie Dénarnaud and inherited by Noël Corbu, reveal that the renovation of the church, including works on the presbytery and cemetery, cost 11,605 francs over a ten-year period between 1887 and 1897. With inflation that figure is equivalent to approximately 4.5 million Euros as of 2019. The construction of Saunière's estate that included the Tour Magdala and Villa Bethania (and the purchases of land) between 1898 and 1905 cost 26,417 francs, or over 10 million euros today.

== In popular culture ==
- The French Television Channel France 3 made a 6-part miniseries L'Or du diable in 1989 about Bérenger Saunière directed by Jean-Louis Fournier, casting Jean-François Balmer as the priest, based on the novel of the same name by Jean Michel Thibaux published in 1987.
- Bérenger Saunière's wealth and supposed secret findings (unnamed this time) inspired the plot of Tim Powers' 1997 novel Earthquake Weather and Marco Buticchi's 1998 novel Menorah, in which Saunière is supposed to have found the seven-branched candelabra of the Temple of Jerusalem.
- The life and mysteries of Saunière were also used as basis for the plot of the 1999 video-game Gabriel Knight 3: Blood of the Sacred, Blood of the Damned, a 3D adventure written by Jane Jensen and developed by Sierra On-Line. The plot also revolves around the history of the Knights Templar, the supposed conspiracies relating to the Freemasons, and the Priory of Sion as well as Jesus.
- In Season 2 episode 10 of the HBO Cable-television series Carnivàle, a "Saunière Manuscript" (located in Rennes-le-Château) is mentioned by the character Henry 'Hack' Scudder (played by John Savage) in the episode "Cheyenne, WY" (first aired 13 March 2005).
- Saunière is a part of the plot line of The Templar Legacy by Steve Berry. The story again weaves Saunière into the hunt for the supposed Templar treasure.
