= Émile Hoffet =

- Born: 11 May 1873; Schiltigheim, Alsace
- Died: 3 March 1946 (aged 72); Paris, France
- Education: Maîtrise de Montmartre (Paris); Petit Séminaire de Notre-Dame de Sion (Meurthe-et-Moselle, Alsace); Novitiate at Saint-Gerlach (Limburg, Netherlands)
- Occupations: Priest, missionary, linguist, writer
- Writing career
- Language: French

Père Émile-Henri-Guillaume Hoffet (11 May 1873 – March 1946) belonged to the Missionary Oblates of Mary Immaculate, who became famous during the 1960s when he became implicated in the subject matters of Rennes-le-Château and the Priory of Sion.

== Biography ==
Émile Hoffet was born in Schiltigheim in Alsace on 11 May 1873, at the time annexed by the German Empire, his father was probably a Lutheran while his mother, Sophie Feisthammel, was a devout Roman Catholic. She made sure her son was baptized in Paris, in 1884, when he began studying at the Maîtrise de Montmartre. Hoffet continued his studies at the Junioriat or Petit Séminaire de Notre-Dame de Sion in Meurthe-et-Moselle, where the Missionary Oblates of Mary Immaculate prepared youngsters who were destined to follow a religious vocation in their Order. He entered the Novitiate at Saint-Gerlach in the Province of Limburg in the Netherlands and took the habit on 14 August 1892. He professed his Perpetual Oblation in Liège on 15 August 1894, and it was there that he was ordained priest on 10 June 1898.

Hoffet taught at the Juniorat de Notre-Dame-des-Lumières in the Vaucluse, spent a year in Rome in 1903-1904, taught for a further year at the Grand Séminaire of Ajaccio and then, between 1905 and 1908, served as editor of the Order's journal, Petites Annales. He moved to Paris in 1914 where he lived at 7 Rue Blanche, situated in the 9th arrondissement, where he was authorized to say mass at the local parish church of Sainte-Trinité.

Hoffet was renowned for his linguistic accomplishments, and maintained close links with eminent men, especially leading specialists and Professors from the Sorbonne.

Hoffet was also involved with the journal Regnabit (1921-1929), that was founded by Prière du Révérend Père Félix Marie Anizan (1878 – 1944), who also belonged to the Missionary Oblates of Mary Immaculate and who was also at the Junioriat or Petit Séminaire de Notre-Dame de Sion, as well as being a devotee of the Sacred Heart.

Hoffet was the author of Papal Theology.

== Conspiracy theories ==
Hoffet became famous after the publication of the book L'Or de Rennes in 1967 by Gérard de Sède, that was co-authored with Pierre Plantard, where it was claimed that Hoffet received in Paris the parchments allegedly discovered by Bérenger Saunière in Rennes-le-Château. This claim was also made in two documents that were deposited in the Bibliothèque nationale de France, but it was Gérard de Sède who first linked Hoffet with the Church of Saint-Sulpice, Paris, as well as the first to claim that Jean-François-Victor Bieil (1835-1898) of the Society of Priests of Saint Sulpice, director of the Seminary of Saint Sulpice (located at the time at 9, place Saint-Sulpice in the 6th arrondissement), was his great-uncle.

The 1965 document attributed to Madeleine Blancasall, Les Descendants Mérovingiens ou l'énigme du Razès wisigoth, claimed Hoffet also knew about the secret of the Château de Gisors (in March 1946, tourist guide Roger Lhomoy claimed he discovered the treasure of the Knights Templar in an alleged subterranean chapel dedicated to Saint Catherine, beneath the tower donjon of the château).

In 1988, Gérard de Sède claimed Hoffet had known the French freemason and occultist, Georges Monti, also known as Comte Israël Monti and Marcus Vella. According to de Sède, Monti founded the original order of Alpha-Galates sometime in 1934, was born in about 1880 in Toulouse, adopted and abandoned by an Italian couple, he supposedly died of poisoning at 80, rue du Rocher, situated in the 8th arrondissement of Paris, a short distance from Hoffet's place, on 21 October 1936 and was buried secretly, also alleging Monti was private secretary to Joséphin Péladan and Pierre Plantard's mentor; de Sède also claimed he'd accessed Hoffet's secret archives in 1966.

Dossiers Secrets d'Henri Lobineau (with an introduction attributed to "Edmond Albe") mentioned Hoffet's death as taking place at 7 rue Blanche, Paris, on 3 March 1946.

About Bérenger Saunière visiting Émile Hoffet in Paris in 1892 to show him the parchments he allegedly discovered in his church at Rennes-le-Château, René Descadeillas had written in 1974 "that it was not possible for him to have been consulted in 1892, as that was the year he completed his studies in Rhetoric and donned the habit as a Novice in the Netherlands" (citing as his sources Father Laurent Béringer, director of the Missionary Oblates of Mary Immaculate in Paris, and Father Perbal of Rome).

== See also ==
- Catholic Church in France

== Bibliography ==
- René Descadeillas, Mythologie du trésor de Rennes: histoire véritable de l'abbé Saunière, curé de Rennes-le-Château, pages 82–83 (Mémoires de la Société des Arts et des Sciences de Carcassonne, Annees 1971–1972, 4me série, Tome VII, 2me partie; 1974; reprinted, Carcassonne: Savary, 1988. ISBN 2-9500971-6-2).
- Marie-France James, Esotérisme, Occultisme, Franc-Maçonnerie et Christianisme aux XIXe et XXe siècles, page 148 (Paris: Nouvelles Editions Latines, 1981. ISBN 2-7233-0150-8).
- Marie-France James, Esotérisme et Christianisme, autour de René Guénon ("Esotérisme, occultisme, franc-maçonnerie et Chtistianisme aux XIXe et XXe siècles, explorartions bio-bibliographiques"), pages 296 ff. (Éditions Lanore, 2008. ISBN 978-2-85157-376-6).
- Petites Annales de la Congrégation des Missionnaires Oblats de Marie Immaculée (Paris: 1891-juin 1914 [I-XXIV]. 1920-1952 [XXV-LVII]
