= Noël Corbu =

- Born: 27 April 1912; Paris, France
- Died: 20 May 1968 (aged 56); Between Fanjeaux and Montpellier, France (car accident)
- Occupation: Businessman, author, restaurateur, publicist of the alleged treasure of Rennes-le-Château 1955-1964
- Education: Degree of Doctor of Science in Paris

Noël Corbu (27 April 1912 – 20 May 1968) is best known as a former restaurateur in the Southern French village of Rennes-le-Château who, between 1955 and 1962 circulated the story that the 19th-century French priest Bérenger Saunière discovered the treasure of Blanche of Castile. Corbu changed his story about Saunière in 1962 (see below).

== Early life ==
Born on 27 April 1912 in the 7th arrondissement of Paris to Désiré-Victor-Henri Corbu and Marguerite-Marie Corbu (née Rousseau), the granddaughter of François-de-Sales-Narcisse Rousseau (1810-1866), an attorney based in Clamecy, Nièvre who, in the aftermath of the French coup d'état of 1851, had been forced to flee into exile into Belgium to escape deportation to Cayenne. Corbu had an elder brother, ten years his senior named Charles-Pierre Corbu, an airline pilot employed by the Société Générale des Transports Aériens, who died alongside his mechanic, during a test flight of a commercial aircraft carrying no passengers at Le Bourget Airport, on 10 December 1927. The young Noël Corbu lived in Morocco due to his father being an attaché at the Embassy there, before obtaining the degree of Doctor of Science in Paris. While living in Perpignan, Corbu met his future wife, Henriette Coll, ten years his senior and a native of the town who was then living at 16, rue J. Tastu, where she ran her business of selling poultry, eggs and cheese. The couple married on 21 January 1935. In the following years, Corbu set up a pasta factory which he named les pâtes Claire after his eldest child, his daughter Claire, situated at route d'Elne, Perpignan. By the end of 1942, Perpignan became occupied by German troops.

== Rennes-le-Château ==
It was soon afterwards that Corbu decided to send his two children, his daughter Claire and her younger brother, to a more remote and less accessible place, to the village of Bugarach. Corbu published his detective novel, Le Mort cambrioleur ("The Burglar Dead") in 1943.

Through the intermediary of his children's school teacher (once Marie Dénarnaud's lodger), Corbu found out that Marie Dénarnaud was selling her estate in Rennes-le-Château. After two years of hesitation, Marie Dénarnaud finally agreed to sell her property en viager to the Corbus and by her Holographic will dated 22 July 1946, she named Corbu and his wife her sole legatees. Marie Dénarnaud could not afford to keep up her estate, which was in need of repairs and she had run into serious debts (that were settled by Noël Corbu upon purchase). The property comprised the Villa Bethania, the Tour Magdala, an Orangery, and the Belvedere that connects the Tour Magdala to the Orangery.

In 1950 Corbu returned to Morocco hoping to set up a sugar refinery, without success.

When Marie Dénarnaud died in 1953, Corbu inherited her archives relating to Bérenger Saunière. During Easter 1955 Corbu turned the Villa Bethania into a Hotel (called L'hôtel de la Tour) and opened a restaurant located underneath the belvedere that connects the Tour Magdala to the Orangery (Corbu installed the windows). Later during the 1990s, the Villa Bethania was turned into a hotel again.

In January 1956, the local newspaper La Dépêche du Midi serialised an interview with Corbu in who claimed that Father Saunière discovered the treasure of Blanche of Castile, and which 'according to the archives' consisted of 28,500,000 gold pieces. This was the treasure of the French crown assembled by Blanche de Castile to pay the ransom of Saint Louis, a prisoner of the Saracens, the surplus of which she had hidden at Rennes-le-Château. Saunière had only found one part of it, so it was necessary to continue his investigations. Corbu also claimed Saunière had in 1892 discovered "parchments" whilst renovating his church "written in a mixture of French and Latin, which at first glance could be discerned passages from the Gospels". It has been noted by critics however that Saunière began renovating his church in 1886, not 1892, and that "there was no evidence that these parchments had ever existed". Corbu claimed that Marie Dénarnaud would confide a secret to him before she died, saying "Pray do not worry yourself, Monsieur Corbu. You shall have more money than you will be able to spend!"

Corbu provided a tape-recording of his story for his guests, a transcript of which was deposited in the Archives de l'Aude, Carcassonne on 14 June 1962 by Maurice Tous of Alet-les-Bains.

Corbu's story inspired author Robert Charroux to develop an active interest and in 1958, with his wife Yvette and other members of The Treasure Seekers' Club (that he founded in 1951), scanned the village of Rennes-le-Château and its church dedicated to Saint Mary Magdalene for treasure using a metal detector. The dowsing-by-pendulum enthusiast and hypnotist Rolland Domergue, with medium Germaine Goyard, joined Corbu in 1958 to look for the treasure, and thus began the extensive accumulation of pilgrimages to the site by many various people from all over France, that on 28 July 1965 forced the local Municipal council to introduce a local By-law prohibiting excavations in the village.

In April 1961, the French Television Channel RTF made a documentary directed by Marina Grey entitled La Roue Tourne ("The Wheel Turns"), that cast Noël Corbu as Father Saunière.

Corbu then changed his story about Saunière on an interview for the France Inter radio programme to Robert Charroux in 1962, dropping all references to Blanche of Castile and claiming that Saunière's alleged treasure discovery relied upon two alleged inscriptions discovered in 1928: one on a gravestone in the cemetery and another on a stone found on farmland property close to Rennes-le-Château (Corbu alleged both "artifacts" were discovered by a retired amateur archaeologist, Ernest Cros, who died in 1946). In the revised edition of his book Treasures of the World published during the 1970s (not translated into English), Robert Charroux added the material given in the 1962 radio interview, but also retained parts of the original chapter on Rennes-le-Château that mentioned Blanche of Castile.

These references to inscriptions by Corbu inspired two documents of unknown provenance called Recherches de Mons. L'Ingenieur en chef Ernest Cros; entreprises dans la Haute Vallée de l'Aude, surtout durant les années 1920 à 1943, commonly called "The Cros Report" (one of them is said to have originated on Corbu's typewriter, the other is attributed to René Chesa).

== Priory of Sion hoax ==
Noël Corbu's account of the discovery of the parchments by Father Saunière was later quoted in the document Un Trésor Mérovingien à Rennes-le-Château (1966) attributed to "Antoine L'Ermite", that for "stylistic reasons suggest that this was written by Pierre Plantard and/or Philippe de Chérisey". Philippe de Chérisey confessed to having forged the famous parchments that appeared in Gérard de Sède’s 1967 book, L'Or de Rennes (as well as faking "The Cros Report") in his manuscript "Stone and Paper". The text of the document attributed to "Antoine L'Ermite" was modelled on Charroux's account found in his book, Trésors du Monde, where he extensively quoted Noël Corbu.

== Heritage, tourism and archaeology ==
Noël Corbu sold the Saunière estate in 1964 to Henri Buthion (1924–2002) and moved to the Château of Saint-Félix-Lauragais which he recently acquired. On 20 May 1968, on his way to Fanjeaux from Montpellier, Corbu's car, a Renault 16 was hit by a truck who had failed to yield the right-of-way. Corbu who was not in the driving seat and not wearing his seat belt, was killed instantly, the driver suffered only minor injuries. Corbu was interred in a burial vault alongside his wife (who died in 1966) in the cemetery of Rennes-le-Château. The estate has been the property of the local Municipal council since 2000.

Noël Corbu's daughter Claire Corbu with her husband Antoine Captier (whose grandfather was the carillonneur of the church of Rennes-le-Château, when Bérenger Saunière was the local priest), first published their book L'Héritage de l’Abbé Saunière in 1985, reproducing a selection of archives relating to Bérenger Saunière, and in May 1989 opened the Saunière Museum in the village of Rennes-le-Château as part of the Association Terre de Rhedae, also part of the local Municipal council. When the Saunière Museum re-opened on 1 March 2009, the story of Bérenger Saunière and the history of Rennes-le-Château was presented in four different languages. The museum was re-opened and re-furbished more recently in 2016 and called Le Musée Domaine de l'Abbé Saunière.

While the local Municipal council superficially accepts the legend of the treasure of Rennes-le-Château because it acts as a tourist magnet attracting substantial financial revenue (for example, endorsing DVDs that publicise the legend), the legend is not treated seriously by French archaeology (itself part of the French Ministry of Culture). For example, when the then village mayor gave the go-ahead to excavate the Tour Magdala in 2003 he was subsequently threatened with legal action by the local body of Direction régionale des affaires culturelles (or DRAC) for doing so without gaining prior official permission and therefore breaching the French Code du patrimoine.

== Published works ==
- Le Mort cambrioleur (1943), Imprimerie du Midi, 14 rue de la loge, Perpignan. Facsimile reprint, Paris: Les Éditions de l'Oeil du Sphinx, 2005. ISBN 9782914405287.

== See also ==
- Villa Bethania
- Rennes-le-Château
- Bérenger Saunière
- Priory of Sion
