= Rennes-le-Château =

Commune in Occitanie, France

Rennes-le-Château Rènnas del Castèl (Occitan)
- Commune
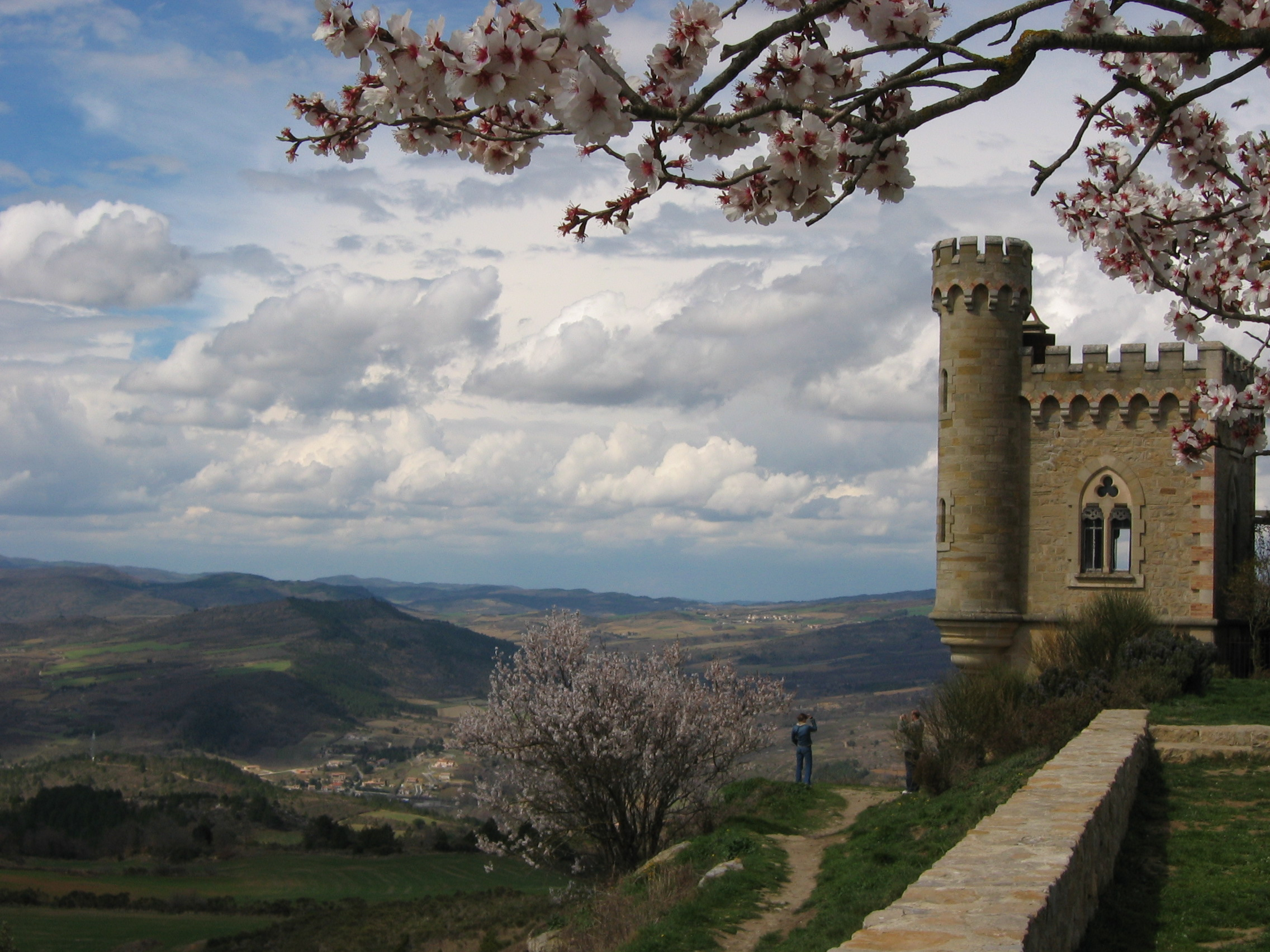
- Tour Magdala

- Coat of arms
- Location of Rennes-le-Château
- Location within France Location within Occitanie
- Coordinates: 42°55′41″N 2°15′48″E
- Country: France
- Region: Occitania
- Department: Aude
- Arrondissement: Limoux
- Canton: La Haute-Vallée de l'Aude

Government
  - Mayor (2020–2026): Alexandre Painco
- Area^{1}: 14.68 km^{2} (5.67 sq mi)
- Elevation: 435 m (1,427 ft)
- Highest elevation: 568 m (1,864 ft)
- Lowest elevation: 272 m (892 ft)
- Population (2023): 89
  - Density: 6.1/km^{2} (16/sq mi)
- Time zone: UTC+01:00 (CET)
  - Summer (DST): UTC+02:00 (CEST)
- INSEE/Postal code: 11309 /11190
- ^{1} French Land Register data, which excludes lakes, ponds, glaciers > 1 km^{2} (0.386 sq mi or 247 acres) and river estuaries.

Rennes-le-Château (French pronunciation: [ʁɛn lə ʃato]; Occitan: Rènnas del Castèl) is a commune approximately 5 km (3 miles) south of Couiza, in the Aude department in the Occitanie region in Southern France.

This hilltop village is known internationally; it receives tens of thousands of visitors per year, drawn by conspiracy theories surrounding a putative buried treasure discovered by its 19th-century priest Bérenger Saunière, the precise nature of which is disputed among those who credit its existence.

== History ==
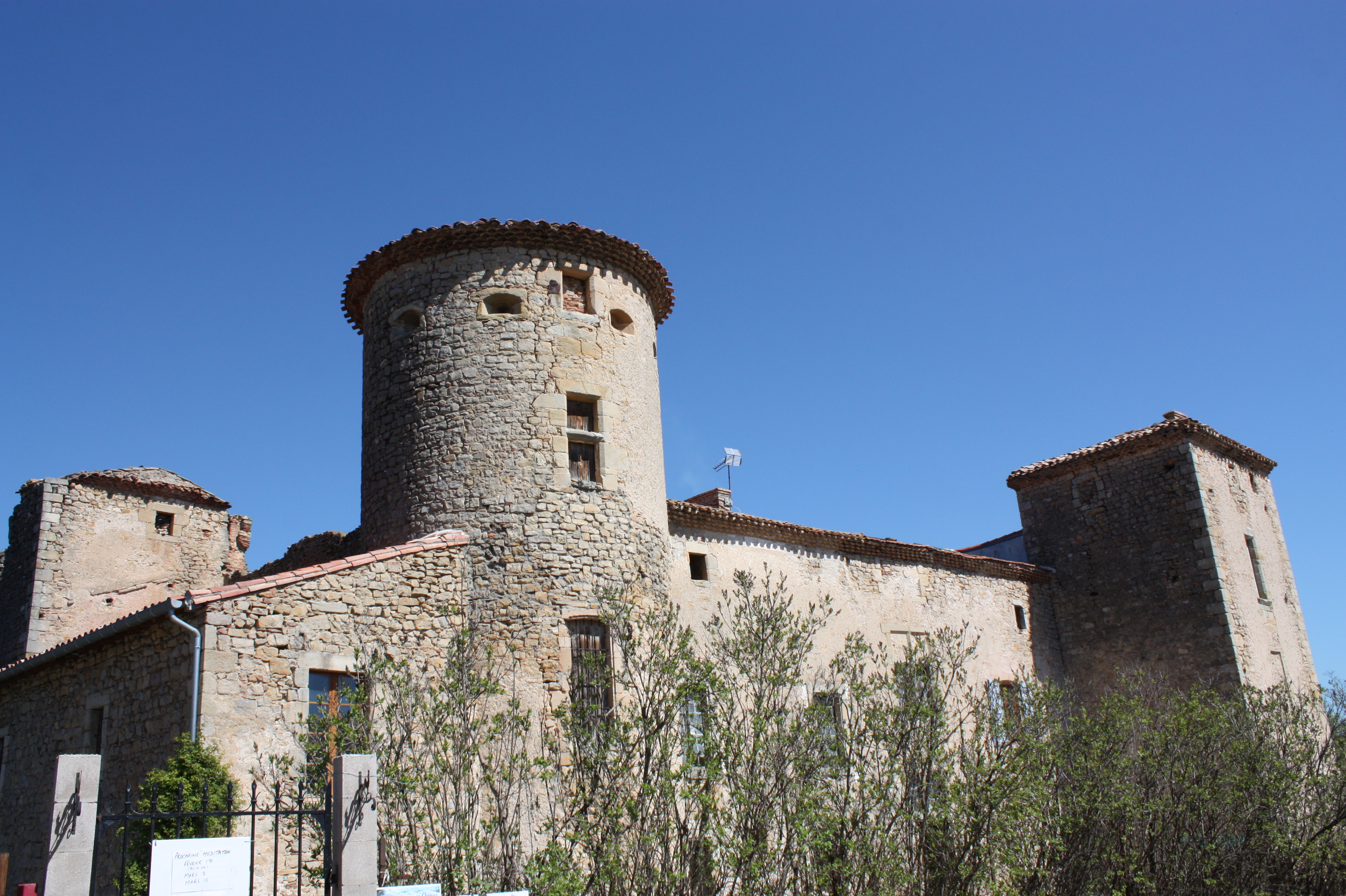
The château in the village, once in the possession of the Hautpoul family. The present building dates from the 17th or 18th century.

Mountains frame both ends of the region—the Cévennes to the northeast and the Pyrenees to the south. The area is known for its scenery, with jagged ridges, deep river canyons and rocky limestone plateaus, with large caves underneath. Rennes-le-Château was the site of a prehistoric encampment, and later a Roman colony, or at least Roman villa or temple, such as is confirmed to have been built at Fa, 5 km (3.1 mi) west of Couiza, part of the Roman province of Gallia Narbonensis, the wealthiest part of Roman Gaul.

Rennes-le-Château was part of Septimania in the 6th and 7th centuries. It has been suggested that it was once an important Visigothic town, with some 30,000 people living in the city around 500–600 AD. Until 1659–1745 the area was not considered French territory, being part of the Catalan Country since 988. However, British archaeologist Bill Putnam and British physicist John Edwin Wood argued that, while there may have been a Visigothic town on the site of the present village, it would have had "a population closer to 300 than 30,000".

By 1050 the Counts of Toulouse held control over the area, building a castle in Rennes-le-Château around 1002, though nothing remains above ground of this medieval structure—the present ruin is from the 17th or 18th century.

Several castles in the surrounding Languedoc region were central to the battle between the Catholic Church and the Cathars at the beginning of the 13th century. Other castles guarded the volatile border with Spain. Whole communities were wiped out in the campaigns of the Catholic authorities to rid the area of the Cathar heretics, the Albigensian Crusades, and again when French Protestants fought against the French monarchy two centuries before the French Revolution.

== Population ==
Historical population
Year	Pop.	±% p.a.
1968	90	—
1975	80	−1.67%
1982	63	−3.36%
1990	88	+4.27%
1999	111	+2.61%
2007	91	−2.45%
2012	60	−7.99%
2017	80	+5.92%
2023	89	+1.79%
Source: INSEE

== Church of Saint Mary Magdalene ==
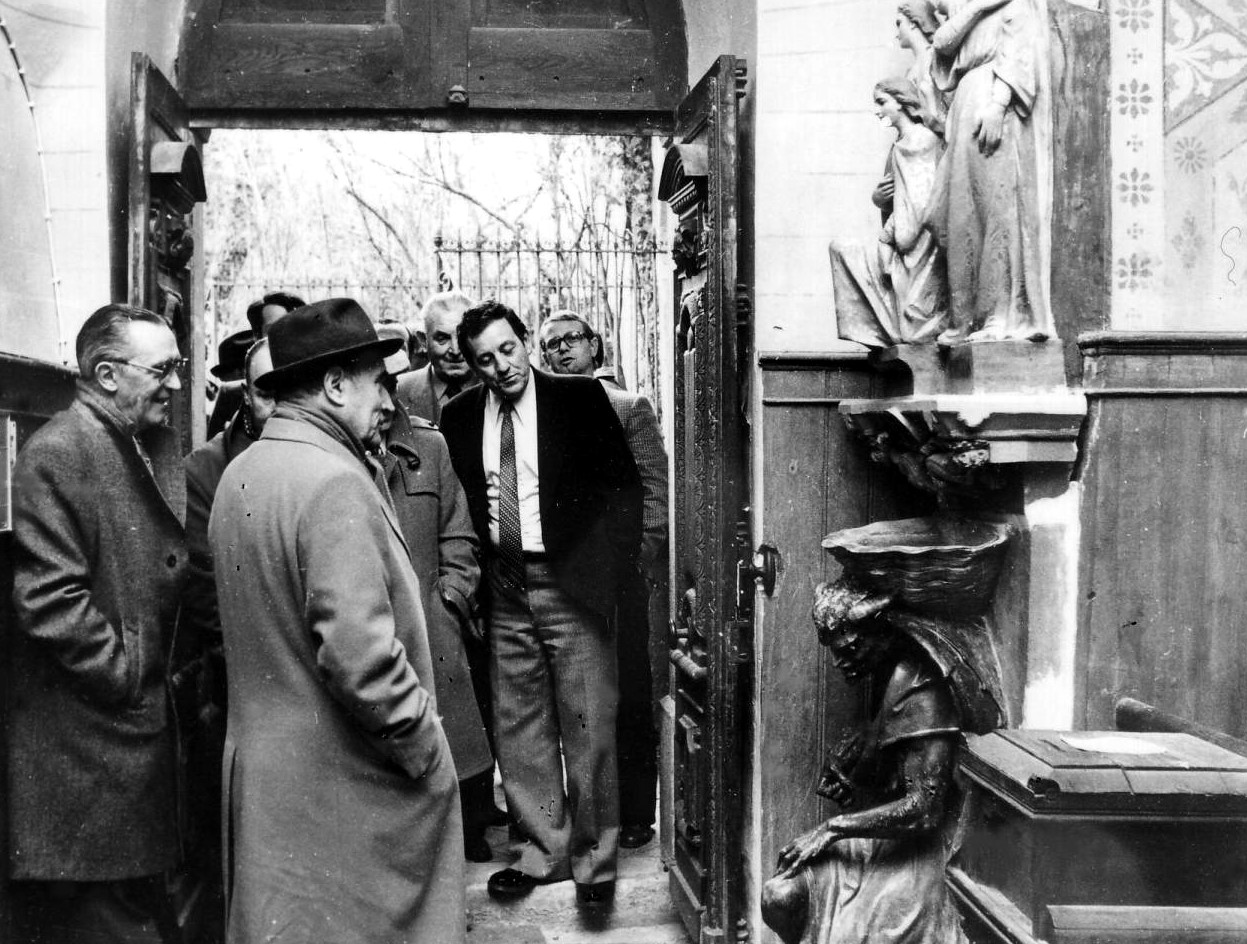
Visit of Socialist candidate François Mitterrand to Rennes-le-Château in the 1981 presidential campaign

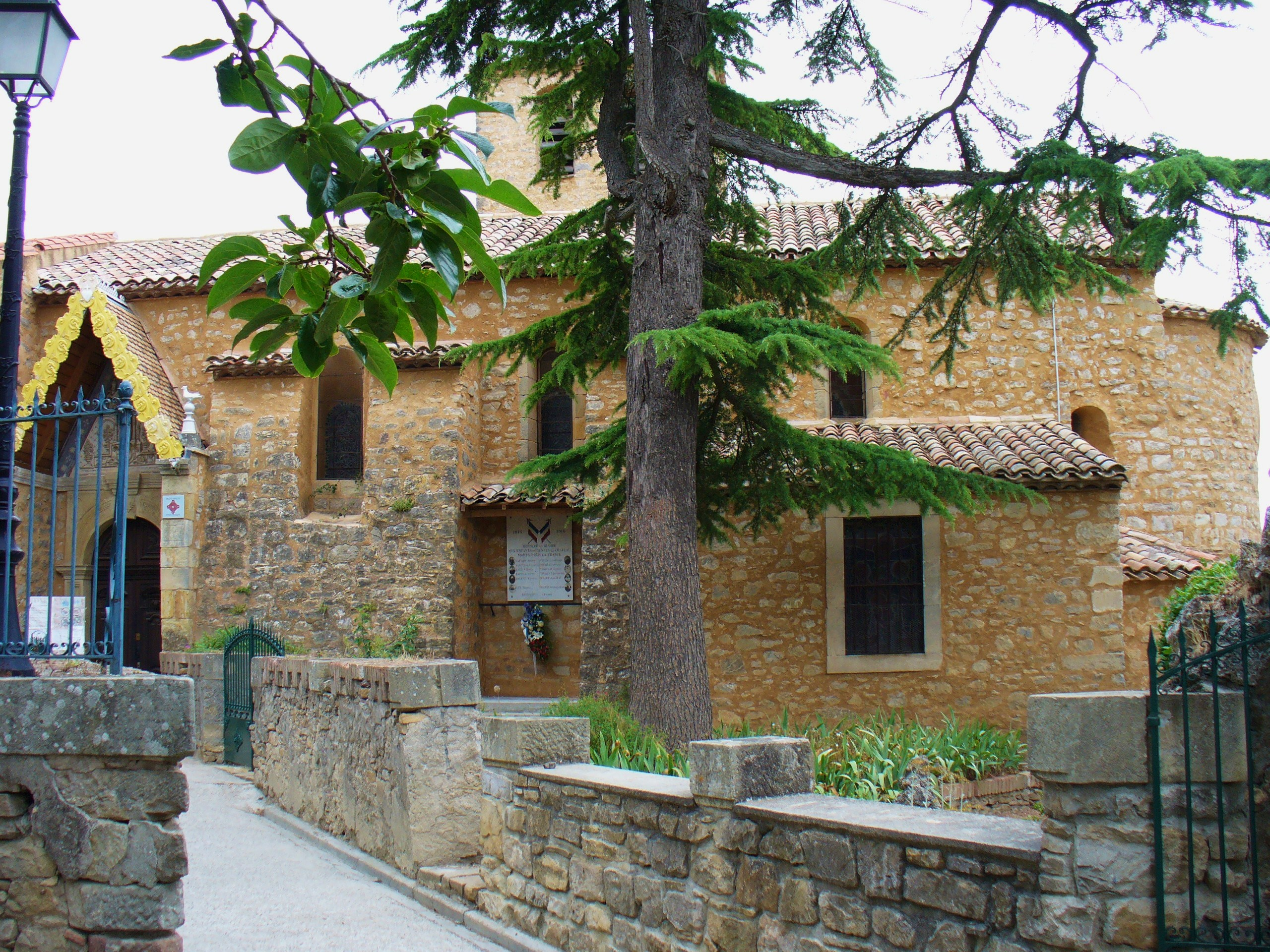
Church of Saint Mary Magdalene

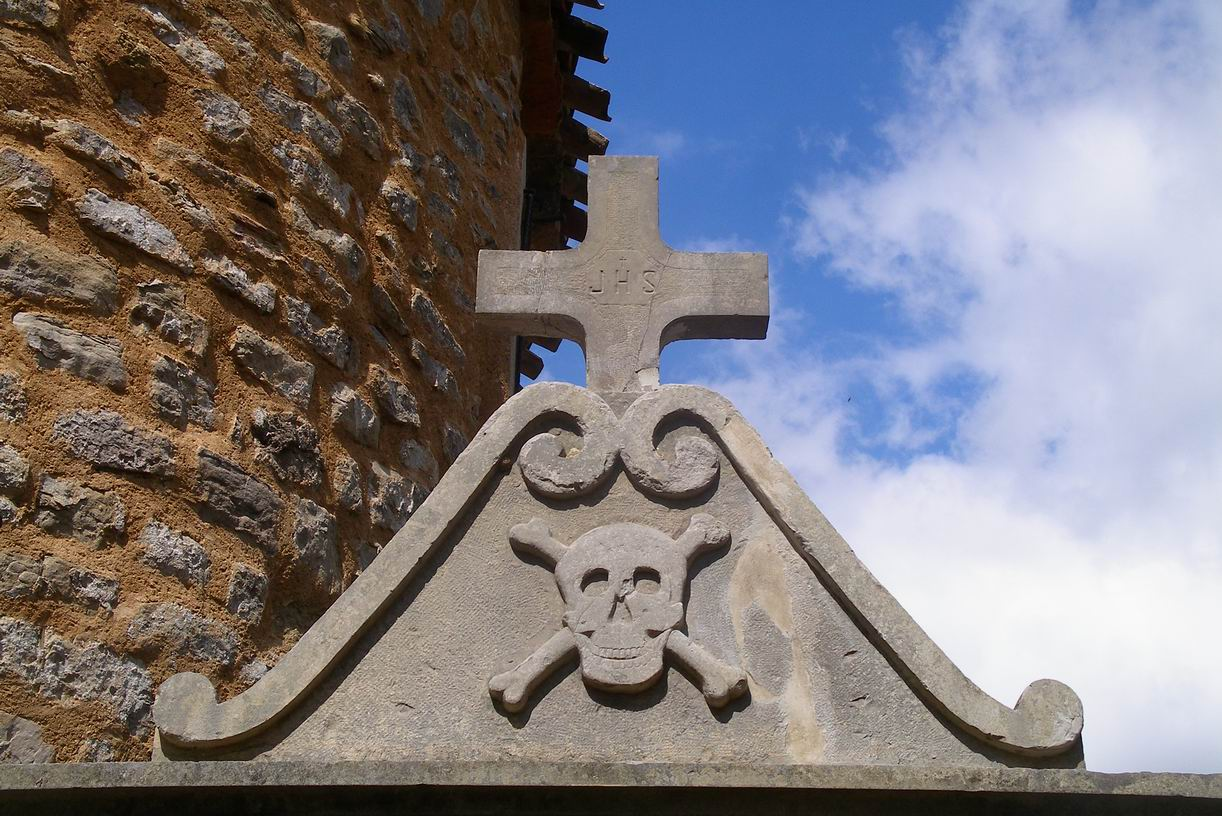
A Pediment decorated with a Memento mori Skull and crossbones figure above the entrance to the churchyard

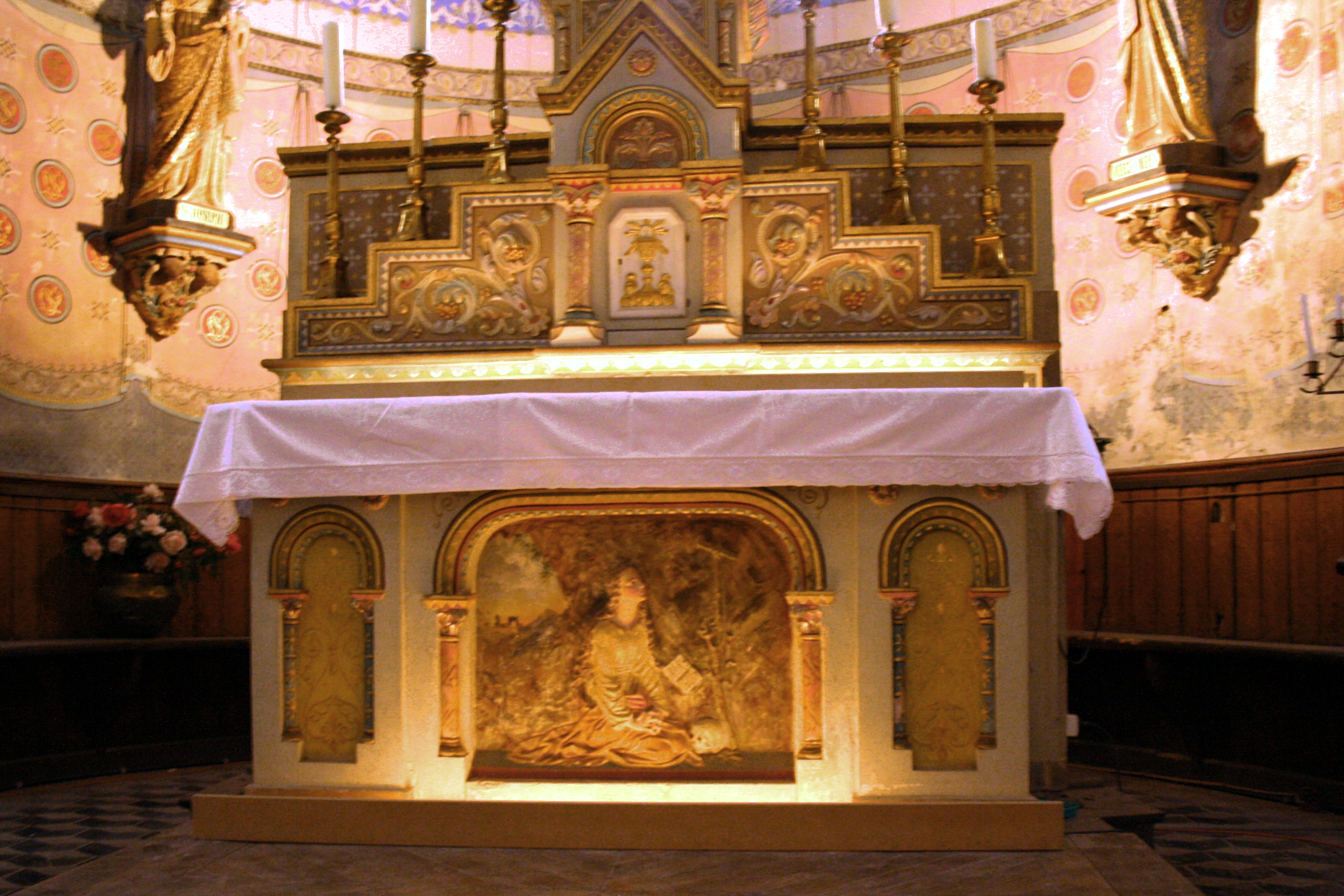
Altar of Saint Mary Magdalene, it features a bas-relief of Mary Magdalene. At the bottom of the altar a Latin inscription (once lost, now restored), reads: Jesu medela vulnerum Spes una poenitentium Per Magdalenae lacrymas Peccata nostra diluas, that translates as "Jesus, remedy against all our pains, The only hope for the penitent, Through the tears of Magdalen Thou washest away our sins"

The village church dedicated to Saint Mary Magdalene has been rebuilt several times. The earliest church of which there is any evidence on the site may date to the 8th century. However, this original church was almost certainly in ruins by the 10th or 11th century, when another church was built upon the site—remnants of which can be seen in Romanesque pillared arcades on the north side of the apse. This survived in poor repair until the 19th century, when it was renovated by the local priest, Bérenger Saunière. Surviving receipts and existing account books belonging to Saunière reveal that the renovation of the church, including works on the presbytery and cemetery, cost 11,605 Francs over a ten-year period between 1887 and 1897. With inflation that figure is equivalent to approximately 30 million Francs as of 2019, or 4.5 million Euros.

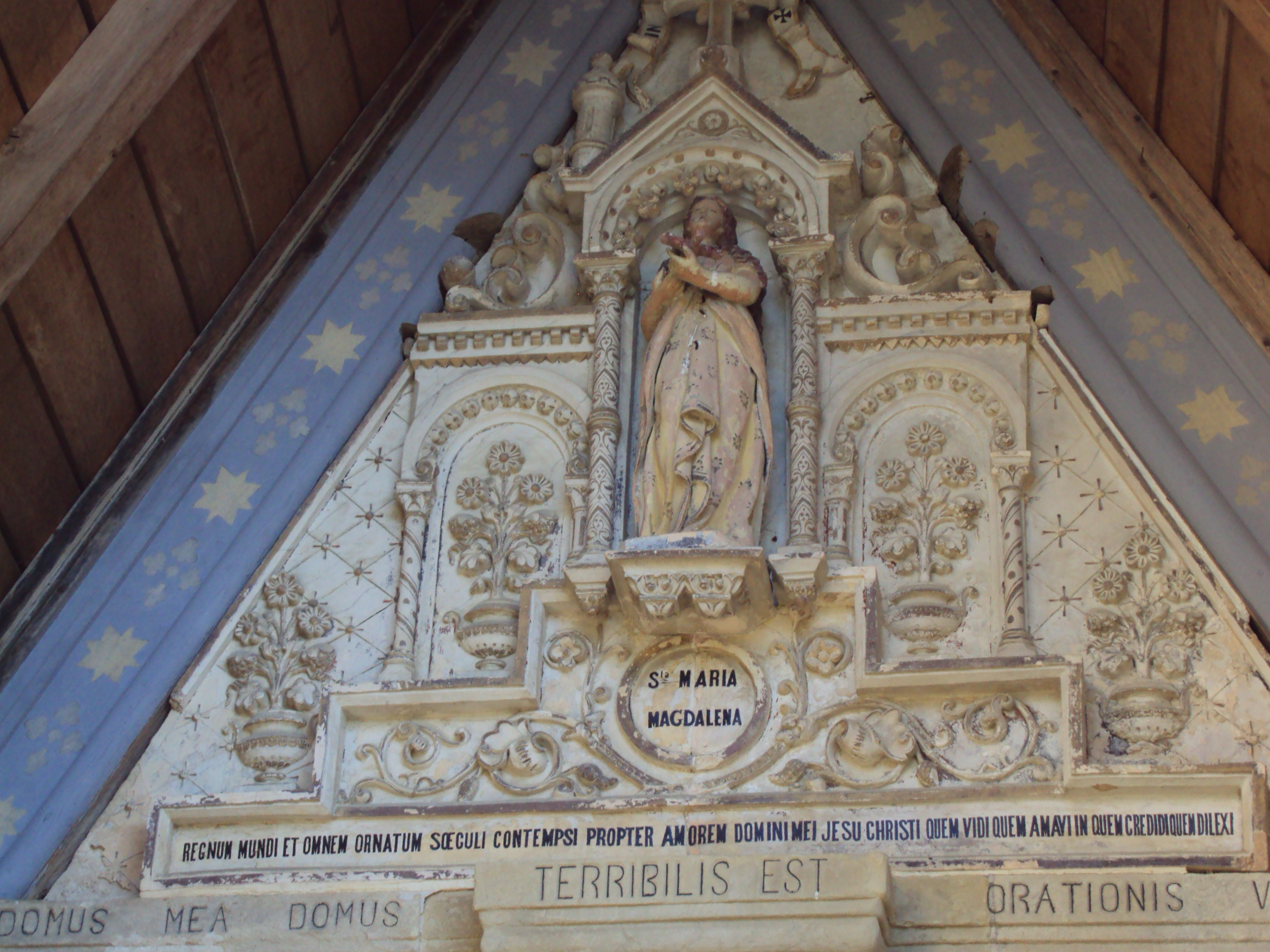
Tympanum of Saint Mary Magdalene

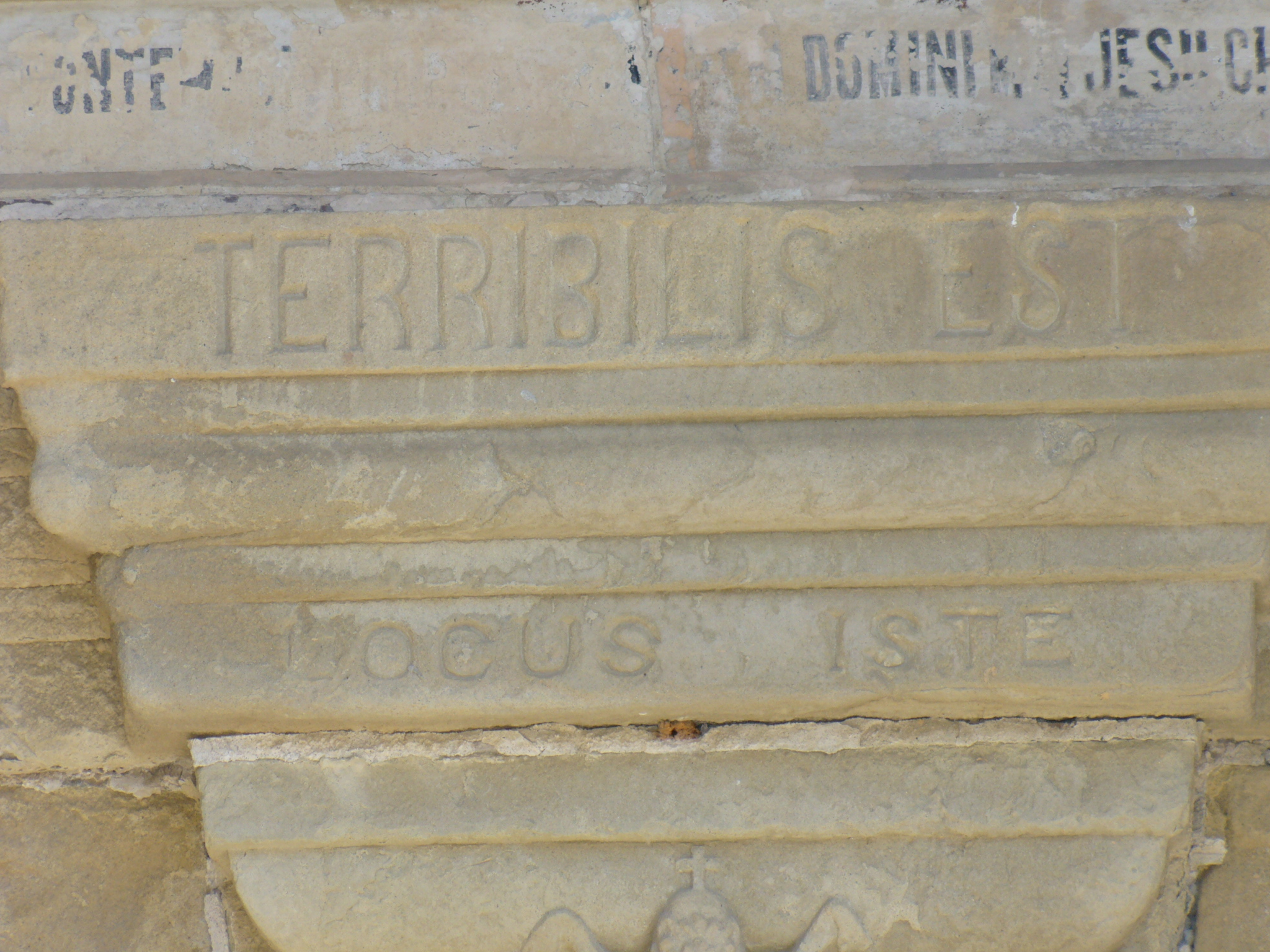
Latin inscription quoting Genesis 28:17 Terribilis est locus iste ("This place is terrible") above the church entrance

Among Saunière's external embellishments was the Latin inscription Terribilis est locus iste displayed prominently on the lintel of the main entrance; its literal and most obvious translation is "This place is terrible"; the rest of the dedication, over the doors' arch, reads "this is God's house, the gate of heaven, and it shall be called the royal court of God." The quotation comes from Genesis 28:17.

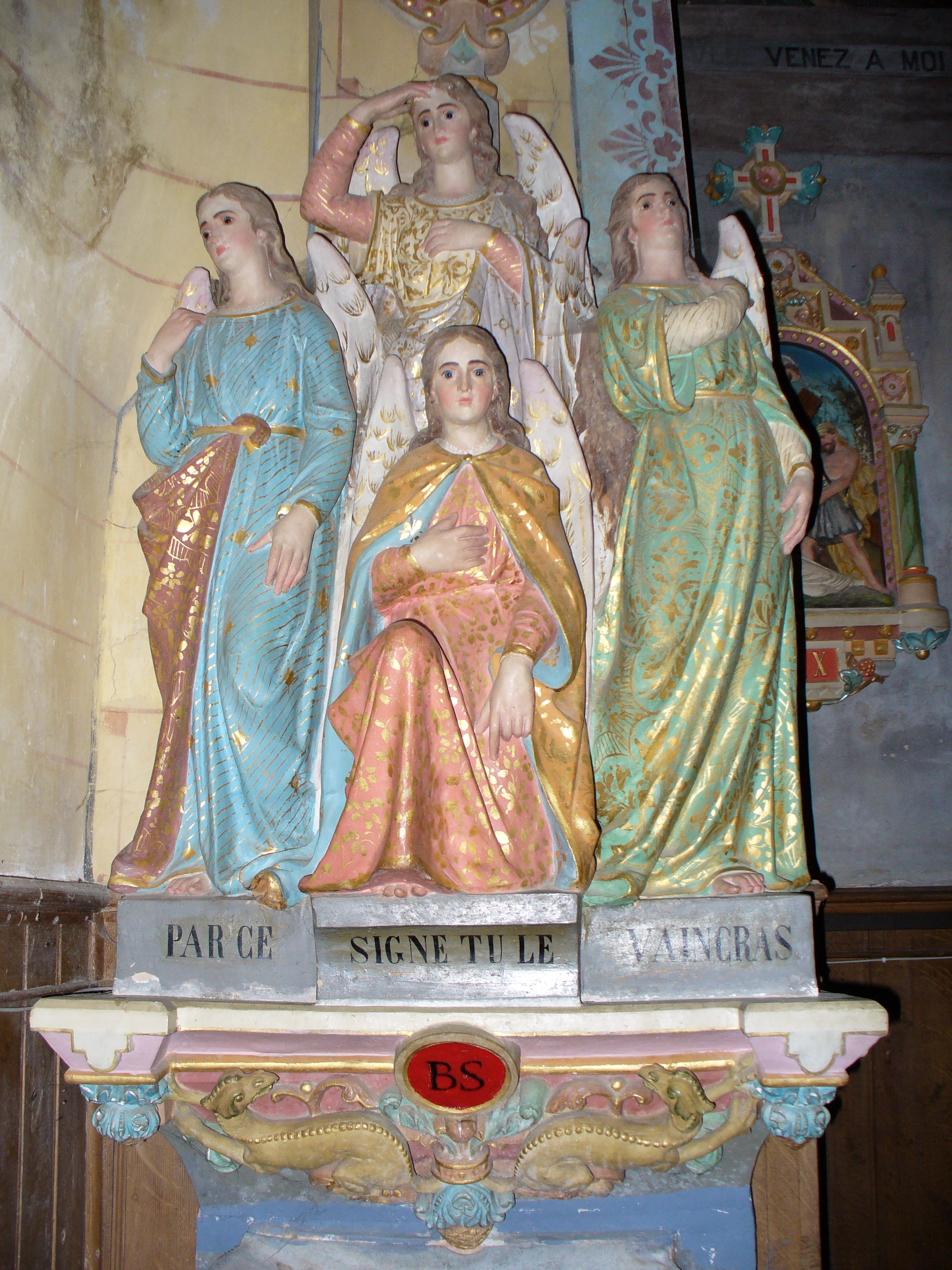
The Holy Water Stoup, surmounted by four Angels and featuring the inscription By that sign you shall overcome him and below, two Basilisks topped by the BS monogram

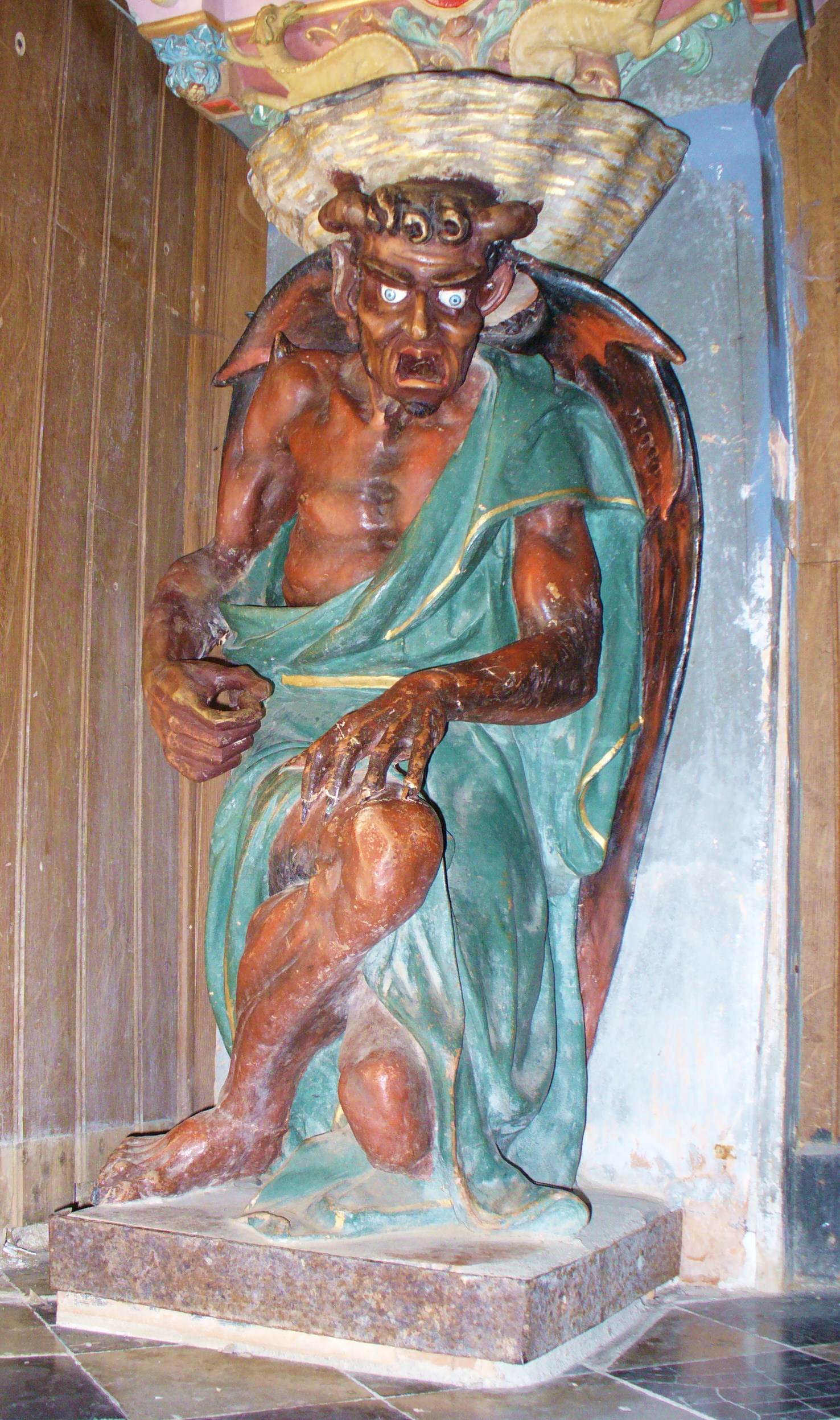
The figure of the demon Asmodeus supporting the Holy Water Stoup.

Inside the church, one of the figures installed by Saunière was of the demon Asmodeus holding up the holy water stoup. Its original head was stolen in 1996 and has never been recovered. A devil-like figure holding up the holy water stoup is a rare and unusual choice for the interior decoration of a Church but not exclusive to the Church of Saint Mary Magdalene; a similar subject can be seen in the Saint Vincent Collegiate church in Montréal, a short distance from Rennes-le-Château.

The new figures and statues were not made especially for this church, but were chosen by Saunière from a catalogue published by Giscard, sculptor and painter in Toulouse who, among other things, offered statues and sculptures for church refurbishment.

Saunière also funded the construction of Tour Magdala, a tower-like structure originally named the Tour de L'horloge and later renamed after Saint Mary Magdalene. Saunière used it as his library. The structure includes a circular turret with twelve crenellations, on a belvedere that connected it to an orangery. The tower has a promenade linking it to the Villa Bethania, which was not actually used by the priest. He stated at his trial that it was intended as a home for retired priests. Surviving receipts and existing account books belonging to Saunière reveal that the construction of his estate (including the purchases of land) between 1898 and 1905 cost 26,417 Francs.

Following Saunière's renovations and redecoratations, the church was re-dedicated in 1897 by his bishop, Monsignor Billard.

In 1910–1911, Bérenger Saunière was summoned by the bishopric to appear before an ecclesiastical trial to face charges of trafficking in masses. He was found guilty and suspended from the priesthood. When asked to produce his account books, he refused to attend his trial.

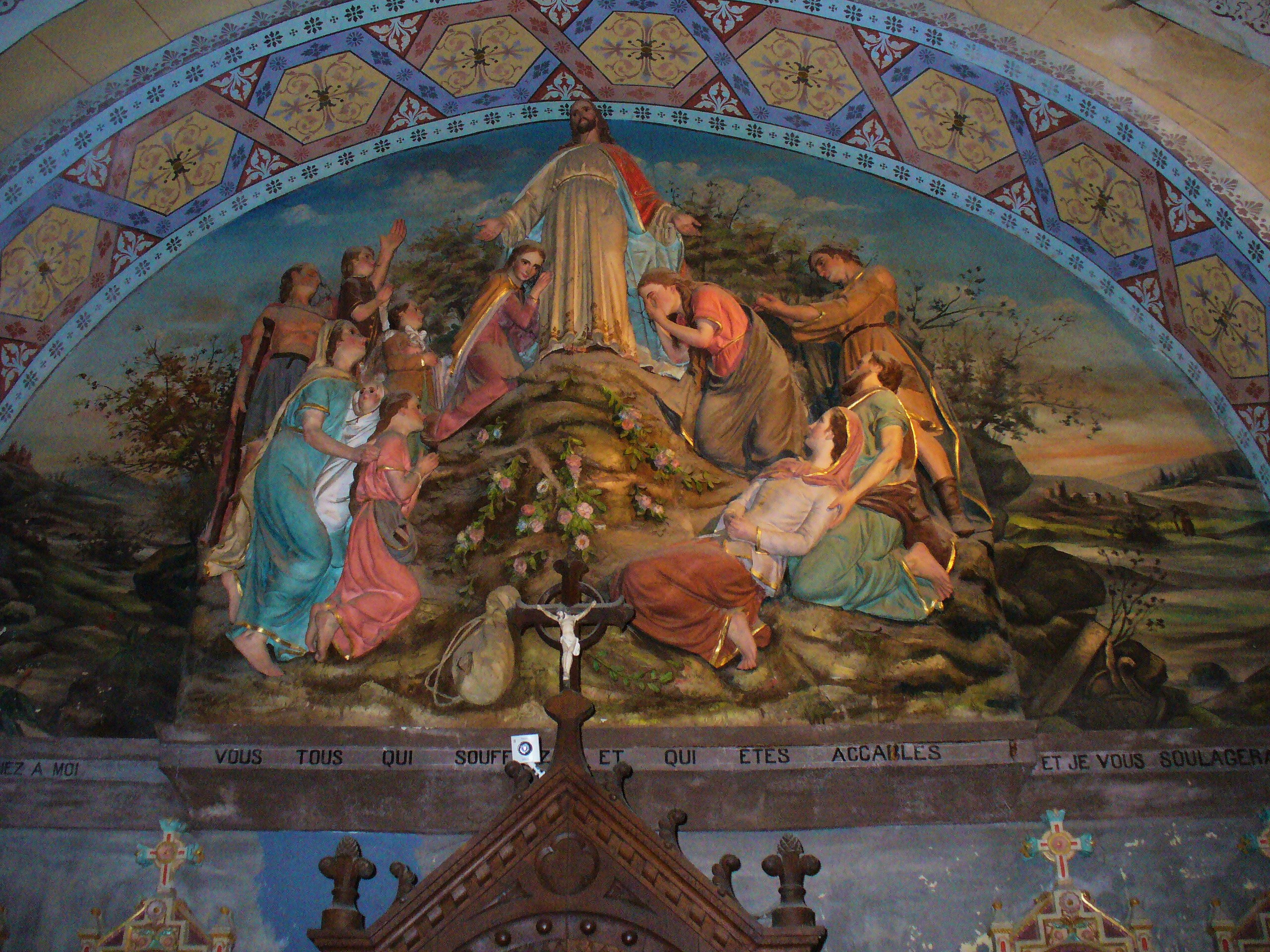
A Relief Fresco of the Sermon on the Mount

Supporters of the hypothesis that Rennes-le-Château and its environs enshrine unsolved enigmas have suggested that Saunière's estate was set up on a large-scale checkerboard, while others have suggested that Saunière produced a Mirror image of selected architectural features of his property. They also claim that Maurice Barrès's roman à clef The Sacred Hill are largely based on the Rennes-le-Château story involving Bérenger Saunière (while novels by Jules Verne are cited to show that the enigma predates Abbé Saunière).

== Modern fame ==
The modern reputation of Rennes-le-Château rests mainly in claims and stories, dating from the mid-1950s, concerning the 19th-century parish priest Bérenger Saunière. Those led researchers Michael Baigent, Richard Leigh and Henry Lincoln to write The Holy Blood and the Holy Grail, which became a bestseller in 1982; their work in turn, uncredited, fuelled key devices of Dan Brown's The Da Vinci Code, published in 2003, as well as other media.

The first known popular article about Saunière was written by Roger Crouquet in the Belgian magazine Le Soir illustré, published in 1948. The author was visiting the Aude to meet his friend Jean Mauhin, a Belgian who had moved to Quillan to open a bell and hat factory, and at his suggestion visited Rennes-le-Château. There Crouquet collected testimonies from villagers about Saunière. Crouquet added: "The stoup which decorates the entrance to the chapel is carried by a horned devil with cloven hooves. An old woman remarked to us: 'It's the old priest, changed into a devil'."

Crouquet's article faded into obscurity and it was left to Noël Corbu, a local man who had opened a restaurant in Saunière's former estate (called L'Hotel de la Tour) in the mid-1950s, to turn the village into a household name. Corbu began circulating stories that, while renovating his church in 1892, Saunière had discovered "parchments" connected with the treasure of Blanche of Castile, and which "according to the archives" consisted of 28,500,000 gold pieces, said to be the treasure of the French crown assembled by Blanche to pay the ransom of Louis IX (a prisoner of the infidels), whose surplus she had hidden at Rennes-le-Château. Having found only part of it, Saunière continued his investigations beneath the church and in other parts of his domain.

Corbu, followed by Baigent, Leigh, and Lincoln, asserts that Rennes-le-Château had been the capital of the Visigothic Kingdom Rhedae, while other sources postulate Rhedae's hub as Narbonne. Corbu's claim can be traced back to a book by Louis Fédié entitled Le comté de Razès et le diocèse d'Alet (1880), that contained a chapter on the history of Rennes-le-Château; published as a booklet in 1994. Noël Corbu incorporated this story into his essay L'histoire de Rennes-le-Château, deposited at the Departmental Archives at Carcassonne on 14 June 1962. Fédié's assertions concerning the population and importance of Rhedae have since been questioned in the work of archaeologists and historians.

Corbu's story was published in the book by Robert Charroux Trésors du monde in 1962, that caught the attention of Pierre Plantard, who, through motives which remain unclear, used and adapted Corbu's story involving the apocryphal history of the Priory of Sion, inspiring the 1967 book L'Or de Rennes by Gérard de Sède. Sède's book contained reproductions of parchments allegedly discovered by Saunière alluding to the survival of the line of Dagobert II, from which Plantard claimed descent. Plantard and Sède fell out over book royalties and Philippe de Chérisey, Plantard's friend, was revealed to have forged some parchments as part of a putative plot. Plantard and Chérisey lodged documents relating to the Priory of Sion in France's Bibliothèque Nationale.

Corbu's story inspired author Robert Charroux to develop an active interest, and in 1958, he, along with his wife Yvette and other members of The Treasure Seekers' Club which he founded in 1951, scoured the village and its church for treasure with a metal detector.

In 1969, Henry Lincoln, a British researcher and screenwriter for the BBC, read Gérard de Sède's book while on holiday in the Cévennes. He produced three BBC2 Chronicle documentaries between 1972 and 1979 and worked some of their material into the 1982 non-fictional bestseller, The Holy Blood and the Holy Grail, co-written with fellow researchers Michael Baigent and Richard Leigh. Their book concludes that the Priory of Sion, via the Knights Templar, guarded the Merovingian bloodline, that this dynasty descended from a supposed marriage of Jesus Christ and Mary Magdalene, and that Pierre Plantard was a modern-day descendant; it suggested that Saunière may have discovered that secret and amassed his wealth through blackmail of the Holy See. Despite its popularity, historians think the book advances faulty premises and that several of its arguments merit questioning.

The bloodline hypotheses of Lincoln, Baigent and Leigh, and their connection with Rennes-le-Château, have been picked up in various media, including by Jane Jensen in the 1999 adventure game Gabriel Knight 3: Blood of the Sacred, Blood of the Damned, set in Rennes-le-Château and surrounds, and later in 2003 by Dan Brown in his bestselling novel The Da Vinci Code. While Brown's novel never specifically mentions Rennes-le-Château, he gave some its key characters related names, such as 'Saunière' and 'Leigh Teabing' (anagrammatically derived from 'Leigh' and 'Baigent'). The latter two authors brought (and lost) a plagiarism suit against Brown in 2006. The extraordinary popularity of The Da Vinci Code has reignited the interest of tourists, who visit Rennes-le-Château to view the sites associated with Saunière.

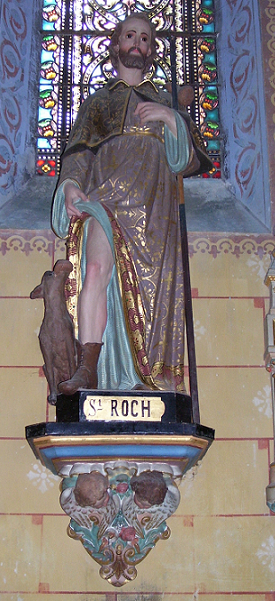
The Statue of Saint Roch set up between the tenth and the eleventh Stations of the Cross

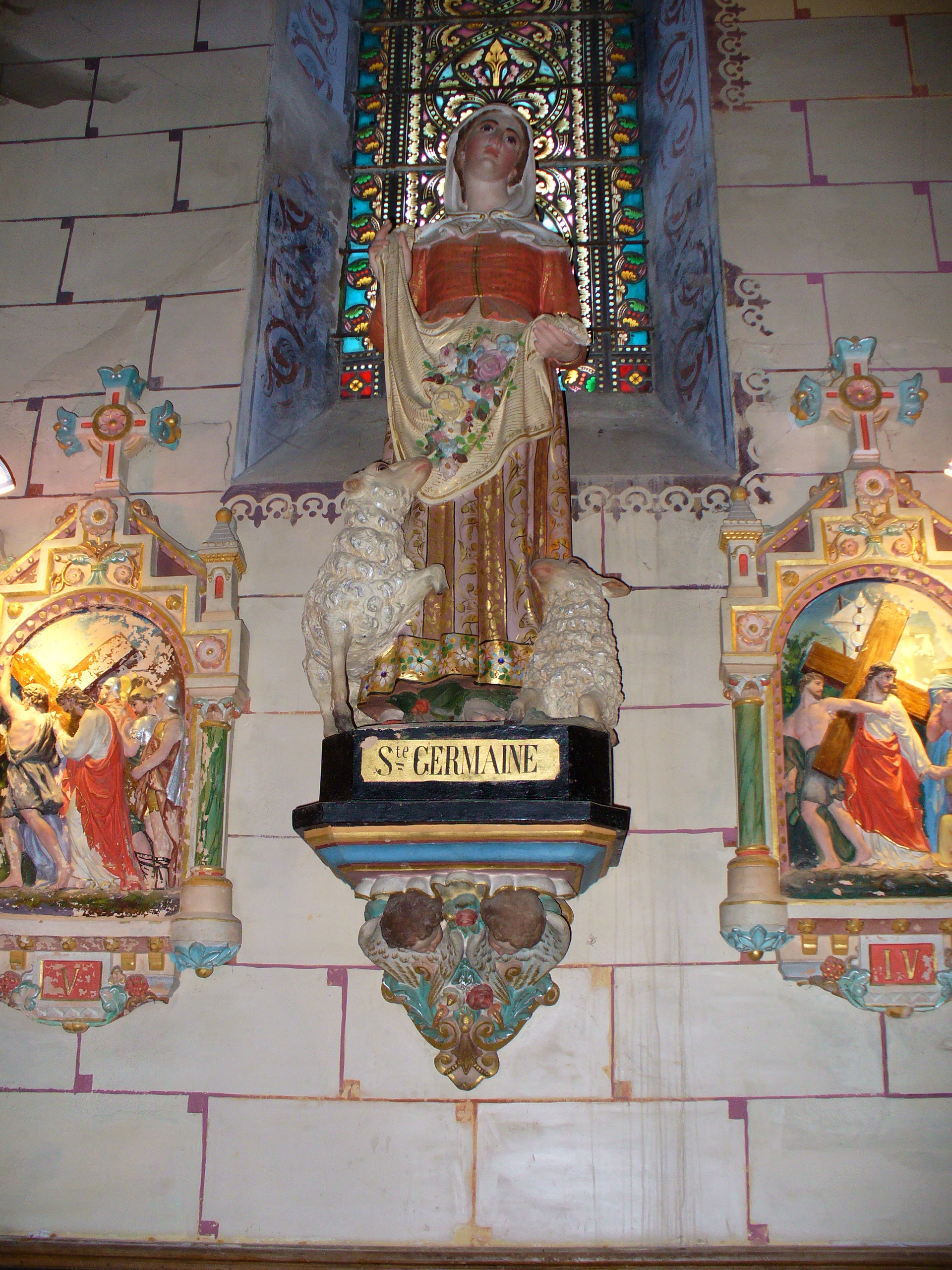
The Statue of Sainte Germaine set up between the fourth and the fifth Stations of the Cross

== Excavations ==
The sudden interest in Saunière's church generated by the stories circulated by Noël Corbu in the 1950s inspired two excavations of the church of St Mary Magdalene. The first, in May 1956, was conducted by Dr André Malacan who, after excavating the subsoil of the church at a depth of approximately one metre, discovered bones that included a skull bearing an incision, but failed to unearth anything else of interest. Dr Malacan died in 1997, and the skull remained in the possession of his family until May 2014, when it was finally handed back to the village following several years of legal wrangling (carbon-dating of the skull has dated it to between 1281 and 1396). Between 1959 and 1963, Jacques Cholet, a Parisian engineer, conducted several digs in the church, failing to discover anything noteworthy.

In November 1956, Monsieur Cotte of the Société des arts et des sciences de Carcassonne asked the membership during its monthly session about the treasure of Rennes-le-Château, which led to an investigation of the subject. On-the-spot research was conducted in March 1957 that lasted one year. Local historian René Descadeillas commented: "They found no evidence anywhere to support the assertion that, down the ages, any individual, family, group or clan could have accumulated a precious treasure-hoard at Rennes and then concealed it in the locality or its environs. What is more, the activities of the Abbé Saunière were undoubtedly eloquent of the sort of stratagems that he was accustomed to using in order to enrich himself."

In more recent times, following up claims by an American citizen, Jean-Louis Genibrel purporting to be related to the foremen Louis Bousquet, who supervised Saunière's works, a publicised 2003 excavation of the floor of the Tour Magdala by the Mayor of the village failed to exhume any anticipated treasure. A simultaneous request to excavate the church met with refusal from the Directions Régionales des Affaires Culturelles (or DRAC), the archaeological body of France.

== Fables, stories and conspiracy theories ==
In the 1950s and 1960s, the entire area around Rennes-le-Château became the focus of sensational claims involving Blanche of Castile, the Merovingians, the Knights Templar, the Cathars, and the treasures of the Temple of Solomon (booty of the Visigoths) that included the Ark of the Covenant and the Menorah (the Jerusalem Temple's seven-branched candelabrum). Since the 1970s, the area's associations have extended to the Priory of Sion, the Jesus bloodline, the Holy Grail, ley lines, sacred geometry, the remains of Jesus Christ, including references to Mary Magdalene settling in the south of France, and even flying saucers. Well-known French authors like Jules Verne and Maurice Leblanc are suspected of leaving clues in their novels about their knowledge of the mystery of Rennes-le-Château.

Christiane Amiel has commented:

No new theory has ever succeeded in entirely replacing any of the previous ones and, as the researches have intensified, so the various lines of investigation have accumulated and crossed in a system of ramifications in which criticism of one line of approach simply gives rise to others

and

Today the vogue is for analyzing and checking the most minute details, for comparing and contrasting rival theories, for reviving old and unexplored lines of enquiry in a new guise, and for an unbridled pluralism which mixes together erudition and extrapolation, and makes recourse to geology, history, prehistory, esotericism, religious history, mysticism, the paranormal, ufology and other fields.

Rennes-le-Château conspiracy theories continue to be a popular ingredient in a publishing industry that is growing exponentially, and are the subject of press articles, radio and television programs, and films. Websites and blogs devoted to the acknowledged historical mysteries present at Rennes-le-Château and environs exist in many different countries; authors' interviews can be accessed on podcasts.

=== Criticism ===
Archaeologist Paul Bahn considered the various hypotheses pertaining to the village of Rennes-le-Château as "beloved of occultists and 'aficionados' of the Unexplained". He groups the mysteries of Rennes-le-Château with those of the Bermuda Triangle, Atlantis, and ancient astronauts as being sources of "ill-informed and lunatic books". Likewise another archaeologist Bill Putnam, co-author with John Edwin Wood of The Treasure of Rennes-le-Château, A Mystery Solved (2003, 2005) dismisses all the popular hypotheses as pseudo-history.

Laura Miller, contributor to The New York Times books section, commented how Rennes-le-Château "had become the French equivalent of Roswell or Loch Ness as a result of popular books by Gérard de Sède."

Christiane Amiel commented in 2008 that the treasure of Rennes-le-Château "seems to elude all the investigations that people make into it. Like the fairy gold which, in the popular fables, turns into manure as soon as a human being touches it, it remains impalpable. It can only exist as long as it remains on the distinctive level of the dream, between the real and the imaginary."

== See also ==
- Noël Corbu
- Émile Hoffet
- County of Razès
- Beale ciphers, for a somewhat similar lost treasure story in Virginia
- Gabriel Knight 3: Blood of the Sacred, Blood of the Damned, 1999 computer game which takes place in the town
- Revelation (2001 film)
- Xenosaga Episode III: Also sprach Zarathustra
