= Coustouge =

Commune in Occitanie, France

- Commune
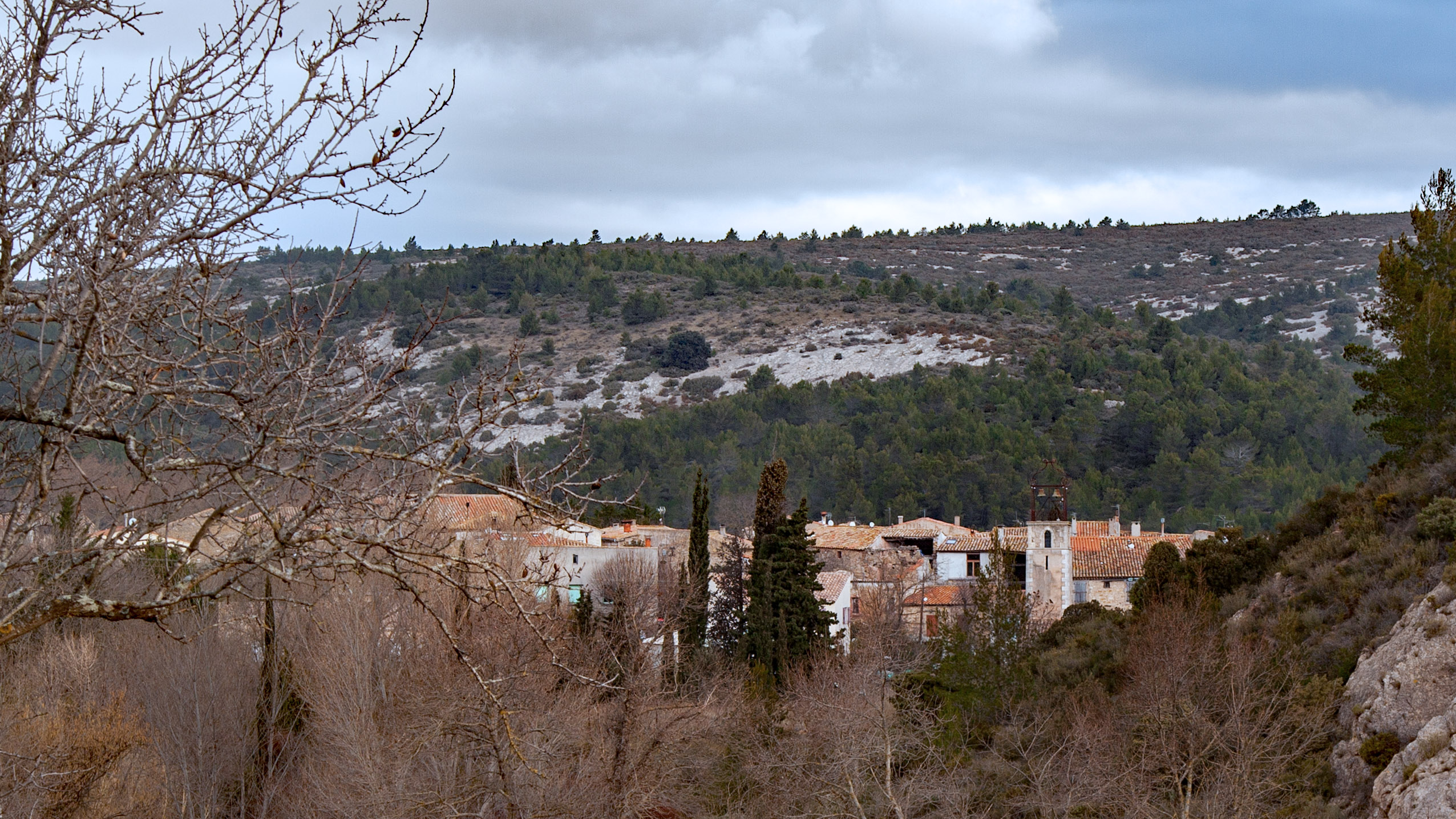
- Coustougue

- Coat of arms
- Location of Coustouge
- Location within France Location within Occitanie
- Coordinates: 43°02′55″N 2°44′40″E
- Country: France
- Region: Occitania
- Department: Aude
- Arrondissement: Narbonne
- Canton: Les Corbières
- Intercommunality: Région Lézignanaise, Corbières et Minervois

Government
  - Mayor (2020–2026): Paul Berthier
- Area^{1}: 9.67 km^{2} (3.73 sq mi)
- Elevation: 180 m (590 ft)
- Highest elevation: 343 m (1,125 ft)
- Lowest elevation: 129 m (423 ft)
- Population (2023): 117
  - Density: 12.1/km^{2} (31.3/sq mi)
- Time zone: UTC+01:00 (CET)
  - Summer (DST): UTC+02:00 (CEST)
- INSEE/Postal code: 11110 /11220
- ^{1} French Land Register data, which excludes lakes, ponds, glaciers > 1 km^{2} (0.386 sq mi or 247 acres) and river estuaries.

Coustouge (French pronunciation: [kustuʒ]; Occitan: Costoja) is a commune in the Aude department in southern France.

== Population ==
Historical population
| Year | Pop. | ±% p.a. |
|---|---|---|
| 1968 | 128 | — |
| 1975 | 105 | −2.79% |
| 1982 | 101 | −0.55% |
| 1990 | 76 | −3.49% |
| 1999 | 73 | −0.45% |
| 2007 | 86 | +2.07% |
| 2012 | 110 | +5.05% |
| 2017 | 121 | +1.92% |
| 2023 | 117 | −0.56% |
Source: INSEE

== See also ==
- Corbières AOC
- Communes of the Aude department
