= Martinelli =

Martinelli is an Italian surname. Notable people with the surname include:

- Alberto Martinelli, French President of the International Social Science Council
- Alessandro Martinelli (born 1993), Swiss footballer
- Alfredo Martinelli (1899–1968), Italian film actor
- Antonio Martinelli (c. 1702 – 1782), Italian violinist and composer
- Anton Erhard Martinelli (1684–1747), Austrian architect
- Arthur Martinelli (1881–1967), American cinematographer
- Caterina Martinelli (c. 1589 – 1608), Italian opera singer, employed by Duke Vincenzo I of Mantua
- Daniele Martinelli (born 1982), Italian footballer
- Dario Martinelli (born 1974), Italian musicologist and composer
- Davide Martinelli (born 1993). Italian professional road bicycle racer
- Domenico Martinelli (1650–1719), Italian architect (active in Austria)
- Elsa Martinelli (1935–2017), Italian actress and fashion model
- Enrico Martinelli (1852–1922), Italian trumpet player, teacher and composer
- Enzo Martinelli (1911–1999), Italian mathematician
- Ezio Martinelli (1913–1980), American artist
- Francesca Martinelli (born 1971), Italian ski mountaineer
- Franz Martinelli (1651–1708), Italian architect (active in Austria)
- Fred Martinelli (1929–2021), American college football coach
- Gabriel Martinelli (born 2001), Brazilian professional footballer
- Gaetano Martinelli (died 1802), Italian librettist active in the court theatres of Charles Eugene, Duke of Württemberg
- Gabriella Martinelli (contemporary), Italian-Canadian film and television producer
- Germaine Martinelli (1887–1964), French soprano
- Gianvito Martinelli (born 1969), Italian former professional racing cyclist
- Giovanni Martinelli (1600–1659), Italian painter of the Baroque era
- Giovanni Martinelli (1885–1969), Italian operatic tenor
- Giovanni Innocenzo Martinelli (1942–2019), Libyan bishop
- Giuseppe Martinelli (born 1955), Italian professional road bicycle racer
- Guido J. Martinelli Endara, Panamense economist and banker, member of the ONAREX
- Jean Martinelli (1910–1983), French actor
- Joe Martinelli (1916–1991), American professional soccer player
- Johann Baptist Martinelli (1701–1754), Austrian architect
- Julien Martinelli (born 1980), French professional football player
- Liliana Martinelli (born 1970), Argentine discus thrower
- Luca Martinelli (born 1988), Italian professional football player
- Lucas Martinelli Finazzi (born 1990), Italian Brazilian football midfielder
- Luigi Martinelli (footballer) (born 1970), Italian professional football player
- Luigi Martinelli (engineer), Italian academician, aeronautical and mechanical engineer
- Manlio Martinelli (1884–1974), Italian painter, active in Livorno
- Marco Martinelli (volleyball) (born 1965), Italian professional volleyball player
- Mario Martinelli (1906 –2001), Italian politician
- Marta Linares de Martinelli (born 1956), First Lady of Panama
- Mateo Martinelli (born 1985), Argentine Association football midfielder
- Matheus Martinelli (born 2001), Brazilian professional football player
- Nicola Martinellli Trometta (17th century; also called da Pesaro), Italian painter of the Baroque
- several people named Paolo Martinelli
- Pietro Martinelli (cyclist), Italian cyclist
- Raffaello Martinelli (born 1948), Italian prelate of the Roman Catholic Church
- Renzo Martinelli (born 1948), Italian film director and screenwriter
- Ricardo Martinelli (born 1952), President of Panama (2009–2014)
- Roberta Martinelli (born 1981), Brazilian journalist and radio presenter
- Rosario Martinelli (1941–2013), Italian professional football midfielder
- Sebastiano Martinelli (1848–1918), Italian Roman Catholic cardinal
- Sheri Martinelli (1918–1996), American painter and poet
- Thiago Martinelli (born 1980), Brazilian central defender
- Tommaso Martinelli (1827–1888), Italian Roman Catholic cardinal
- Tristano Martinelli (1555–1630), Italian actor in the commedia dell'arte tradition, probably the first to be called “Harlequin”
- Vincenzo Martinelli (1737–1807), Italian painter of canvas and fresco landscapes, active in Bologna

In fiction

- Janete Fontes Martinelli, interpreter of Liliana Castro in the Brazilian telenovela Caminhos do Coração, aired on Rede Record.
- Kate Martinelli, the fictional lesbian detective featured in novelist's Laurie R. King mysteries
