= Martinelli (disambiguation) =

Martinelli is an Italian surname

Martinelli may also refer to:

- Martinelli (band), brand of sparkling cider
- Martinelli's, brand of sparkling cider
- Martinelli Building, Located in São Paulo, first skyscraper built in Brazil

== See also ==
- Martini (disambiguation)
