= Peterskirche, Vienna =

Baroque Roman Catholic parish church in Vienna, Austria

Peterskirche
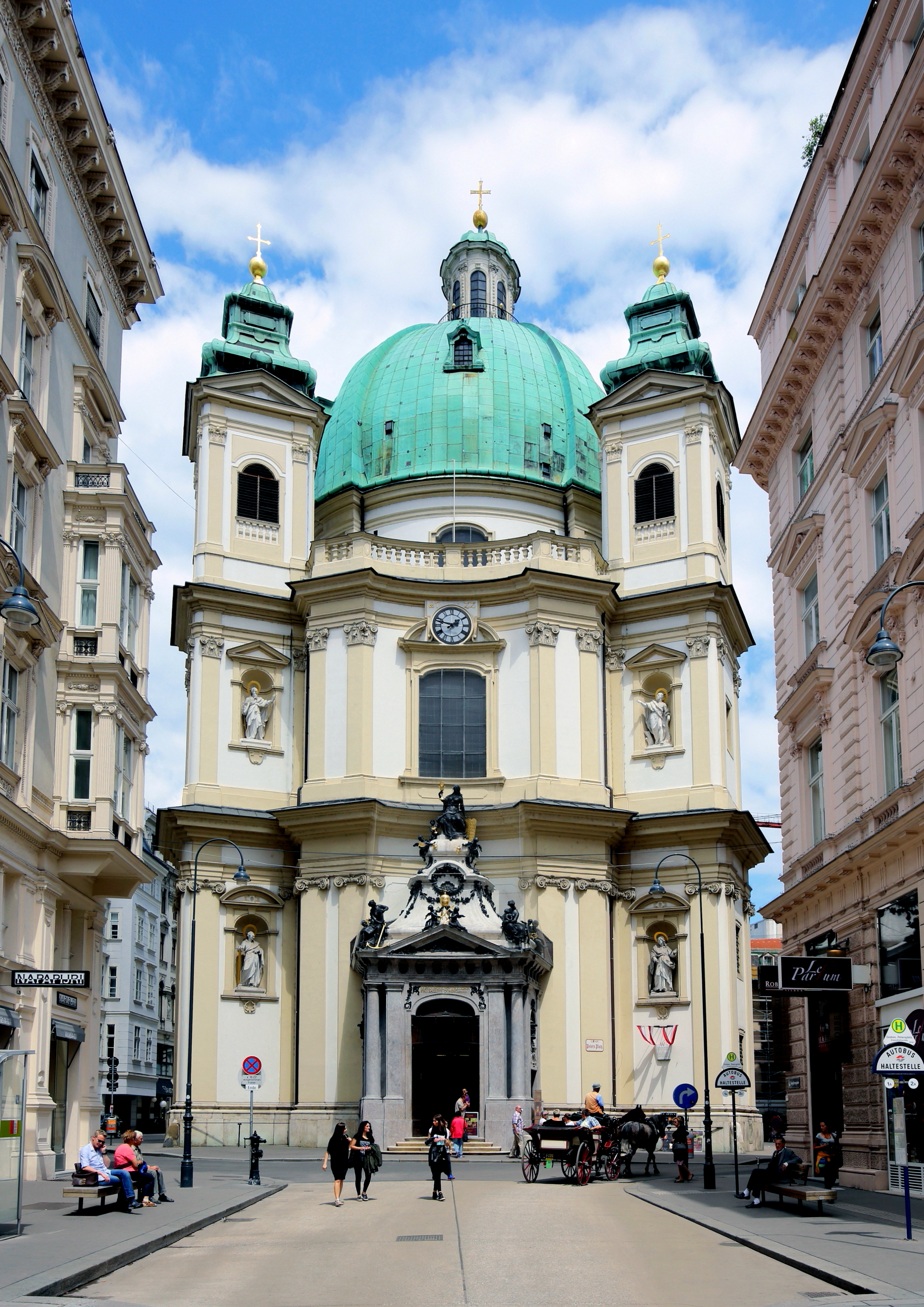
- Peterskirche main facade, seen from the Graben street

- Location within Vienna Location within Austria

Religion
- Affiliation: Catholic Church
- Province: Archdiocese of Wien
- Leadership: P. Christian Spalek S.C.O.D.
- Year consecrated: 1733

Location
- Location: Vienna, Austria
- Coordinates: 48.2093°N 16.3695°E

Architecture
- Architects: Gabriele Montani (initial plan); Johann Lukas von Hildebrandt (modifications); Kilian Ignaz Dientzenhofer (facade)
- Type: Church
- Style: Baroque
- Groundbreaking: 1701
- Completed: 1733

Specifications
- Direction of façade: SW
- Capacity: 400
- Length: 50 metres (160 ft)
- Width: 20 metres (66 ft)
- Height (max): 56.8 metres (186 ft)
- Dome: 1
- Dome height (outer): 54 metres (177 ft)
- Dome dia. (outer): 30 metres (98 ft)

Website
- www.peterskirche.at

The Peterskirche (English: St. Peter's Church) is a Baroque Roman Catholic parish church in Vienna, Austria. It was transferred in 1970 by the Archbishop of Vienna Franz Cardinal König to the priests of the Opus Dei.

== The first church ==
The oldest church building (of which nothing remains today) dates back to the Early Middle Ages, and there is speculation that it could be the oldest church in Vienna (see Ruprechtskirche). That Roman church was built on the site of a Roman encampment.

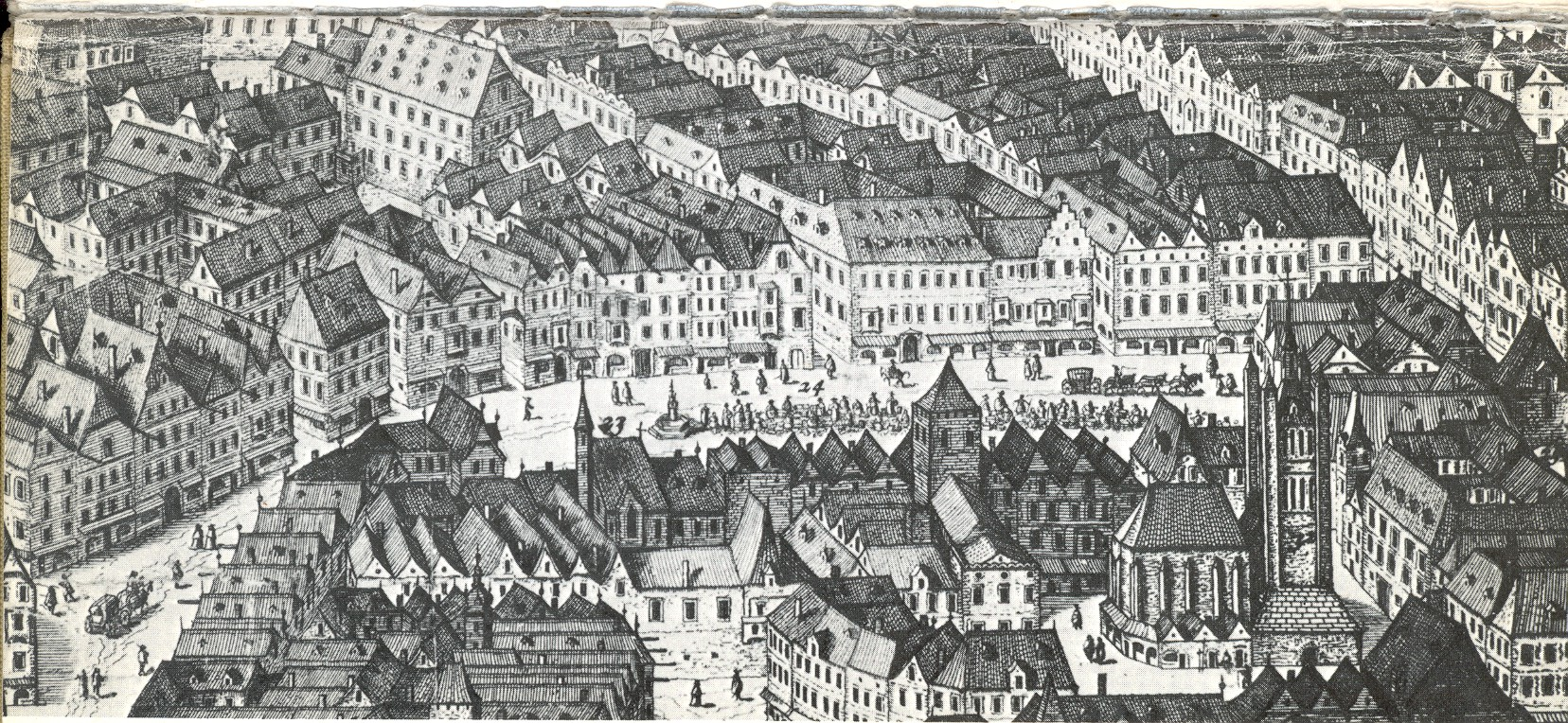
View of the Graben with the mediaeval church (Jacob Hoefnagel, 1609)

This church was replaced with a Romanesque church with a nave and two aisles. It is believed to have been established by Charlemagne around 800, although there is no evidence supporting this view. At the outside of the church, there is a relief sculpture by R. Weyr consecrated to the founding of the church by Charlemagne. In any case, a church of Saint Peter in Vienna is first mentioned in 1137. Around the end of the 12th century, the church became part of the Schottenstift.

The mediaeval church had three altars, with an apse in the south instead of the normal eastern orientation. This unusual feature has triggered many discussions among experts, and it is suspected that the church was adapted from a previously secular building. The church was surrounded by shops, and a nearby building housed the Stadtguardia, a forerunner of the modern police. The old church burned down in 1661 and was given only makeshift repairs. The decision to build a new church was taken up with the arrival of the Fraternity of the Holy Trinity of which the emperor Leopold I was a member. He had taken a vow to rebuild this church when Vienna was ravaged by the plague in 1679–1680.

== The new building ==
The construction of the new Baroque church was begun around 1701 under Gabriele Montani, who was replaced by Johann Lukas von Hildebrandt in 1703. The design was inspired by the St. Peter's Basilica of the Vatican in Rome. Francesco Martinelli was the main architect. By 1722, most of the building was finished, and in 1733 the Peterskirche was finally consecrated to the Holy Trinity. The new church was the first domed structure in baroque Vienna. Due to the confinement of available space, it was built in a compact form, with its oval interior housing an astonishing amount of space and rectangular attachments. The church's interior has a lot of gold stucco.

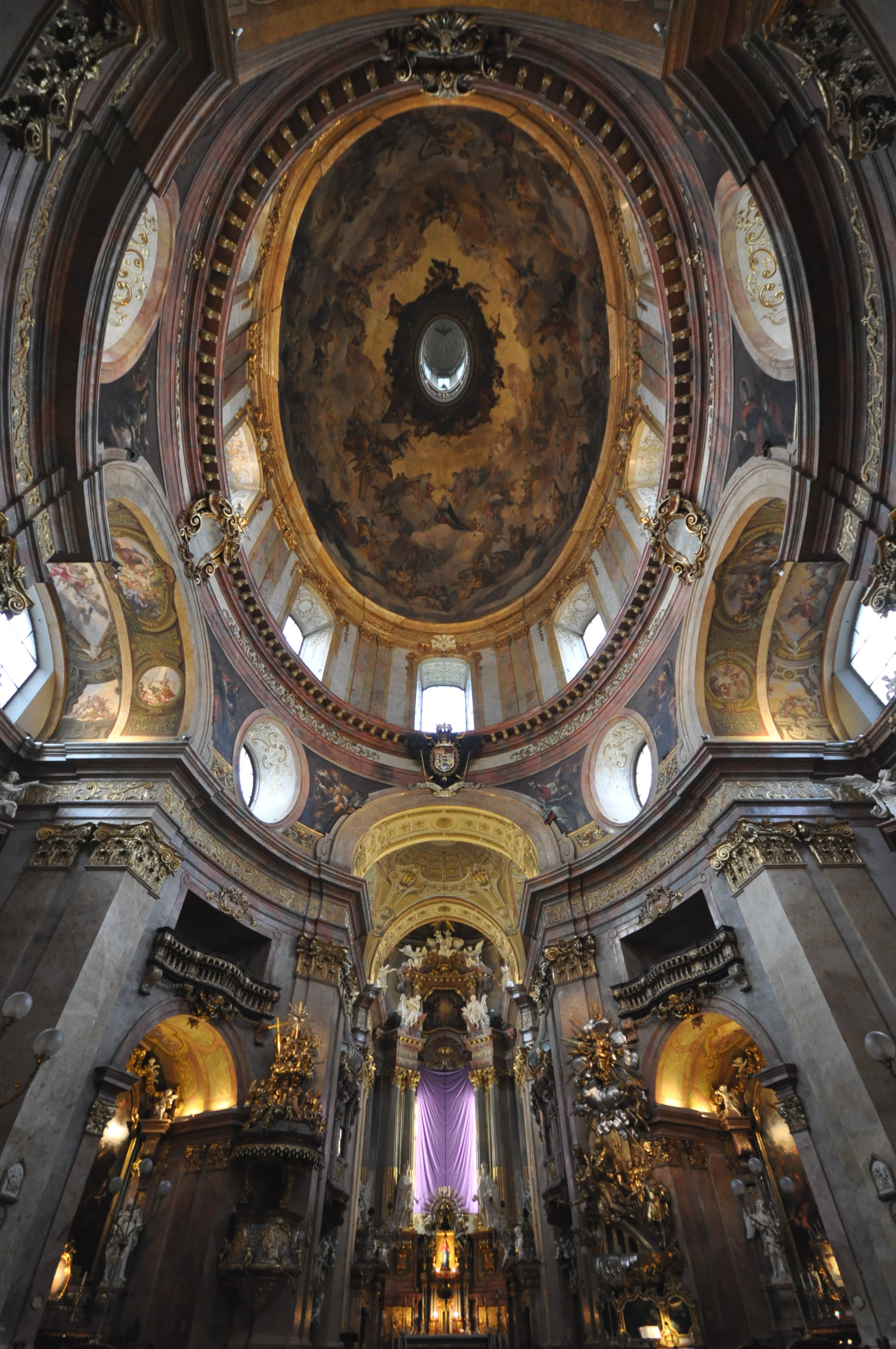
View of the dome and altar

The turreted dome was mainly designed by Matthias Steinl, who was also responsible for the interior decoration and the pews with cherubic heads. The frescoes were originally painted by the Italian Andrea Pozzo, whose paintings were removed after his death. As a result, in 1713, Johann Michael Rottmayr was able to start a completely new set. The fresco in the cupola represents the Coronation of Our Lady. On the triumphal arch one can see the coat of arms of emperor Leopold I. In the spandrels around the dome are portrayals of the four Evangelists and four Fathers of the Church, painted by the Viennese artist J.G. Schmidt. The same artist also painted the altarpiece in the side chapel of St. Michael.

The Baroque high altar was created by Antonio Galli Bibiena and his Bolognese workshop (construction) and Martino Altomonte (1657–1745) (altarpiece). The altarpiece portrays the Healing of the Lame by St. Peter and St. John in Jerusalem. The same artist also painted the altarpiece in the side chapel of the Holy Family. The small painting of the Immaculate Conception above the high altar is by the 19th century artist Kupelwieser. The shrines in the side chapels of the Holy Family and St. Michael contain martyrs from Roman catacombs, donated by Cardinal Kollonitz in 1733. They were clothed in this period and placed in the glass coffins.

The gilded pulpit is a work by Matthias Steinl (1726) having, on top of the canopy, a representation of the Holy Trinity. Opposite the pulpit there is a gold-and-silver representation of the Martyrdom of St. John of Nepomuk, sculpted by Lorenzo Mattielli. On top of it is a statue of The Mother of God.

Over the years, the paintings had become darker, and the interior began to take on a grey appearance. From 1998 to 2004, the church underwent a renovation, which returned the paintings to their original colouring and brightness.

== Access ==
The Peterskirche is located on Petersplatz, right next to Graben and just west of the Pestsäule. The street Jungferngasse cuts through the pedestrian zone and leads directly to the church. The Peterskirche is largely obscured by the surrounding buildings, and can only be seen clearly from directly in front.

== See also ==
- 18th-century Western domes

== Gallery ==
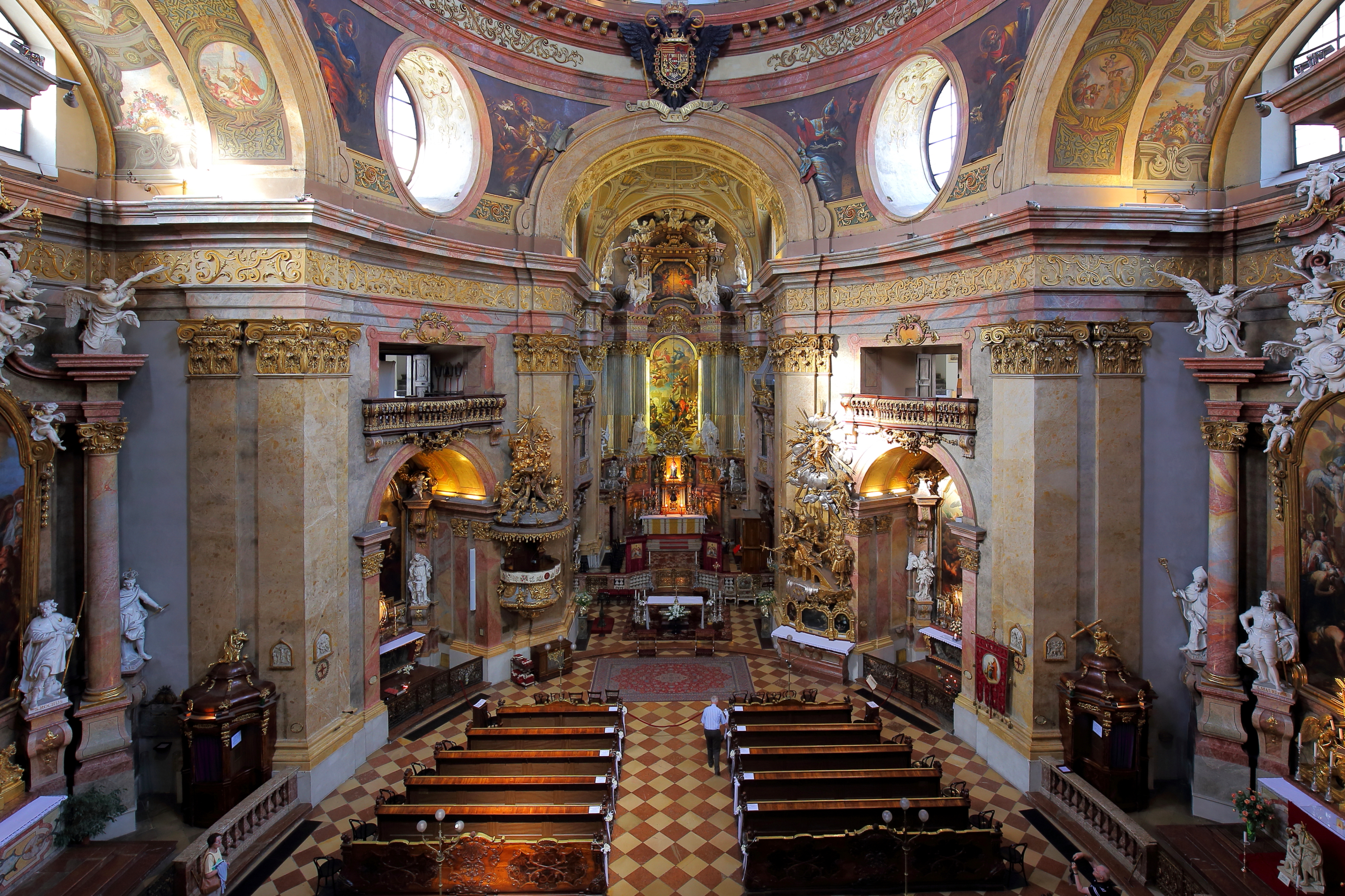
Interior view from the gallery

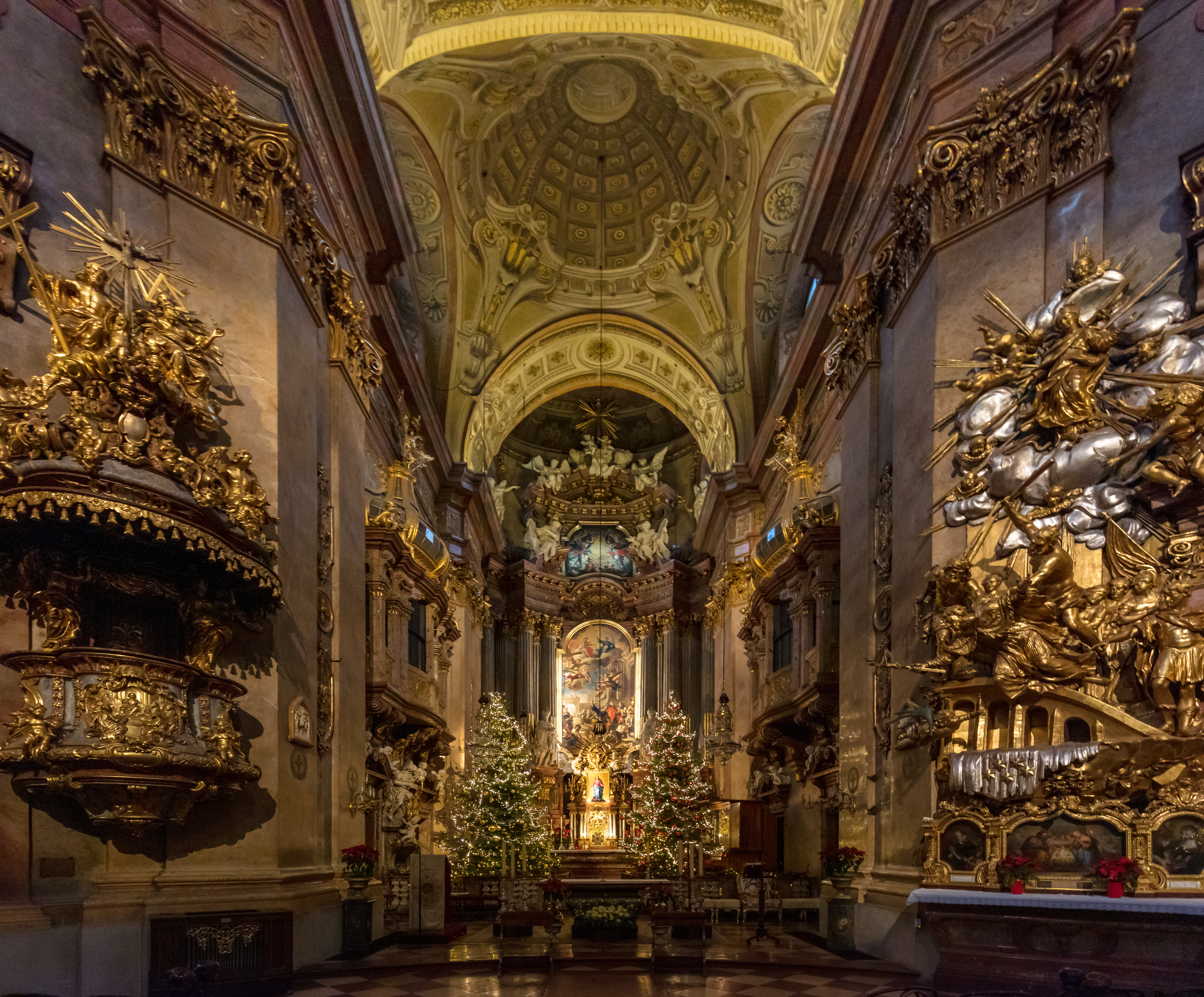
Interior of Peterskirche

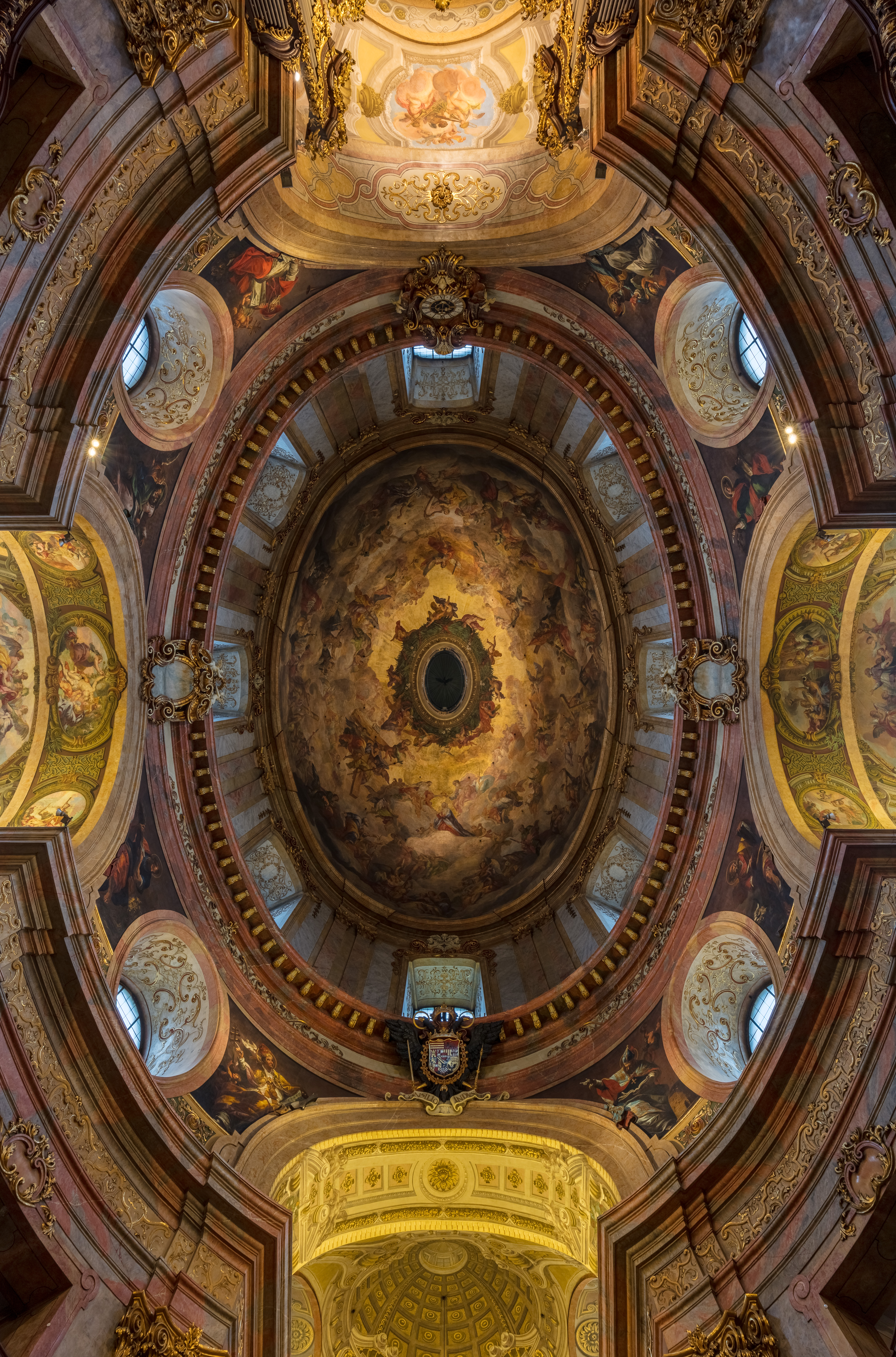
Detail of the dome's frescoes

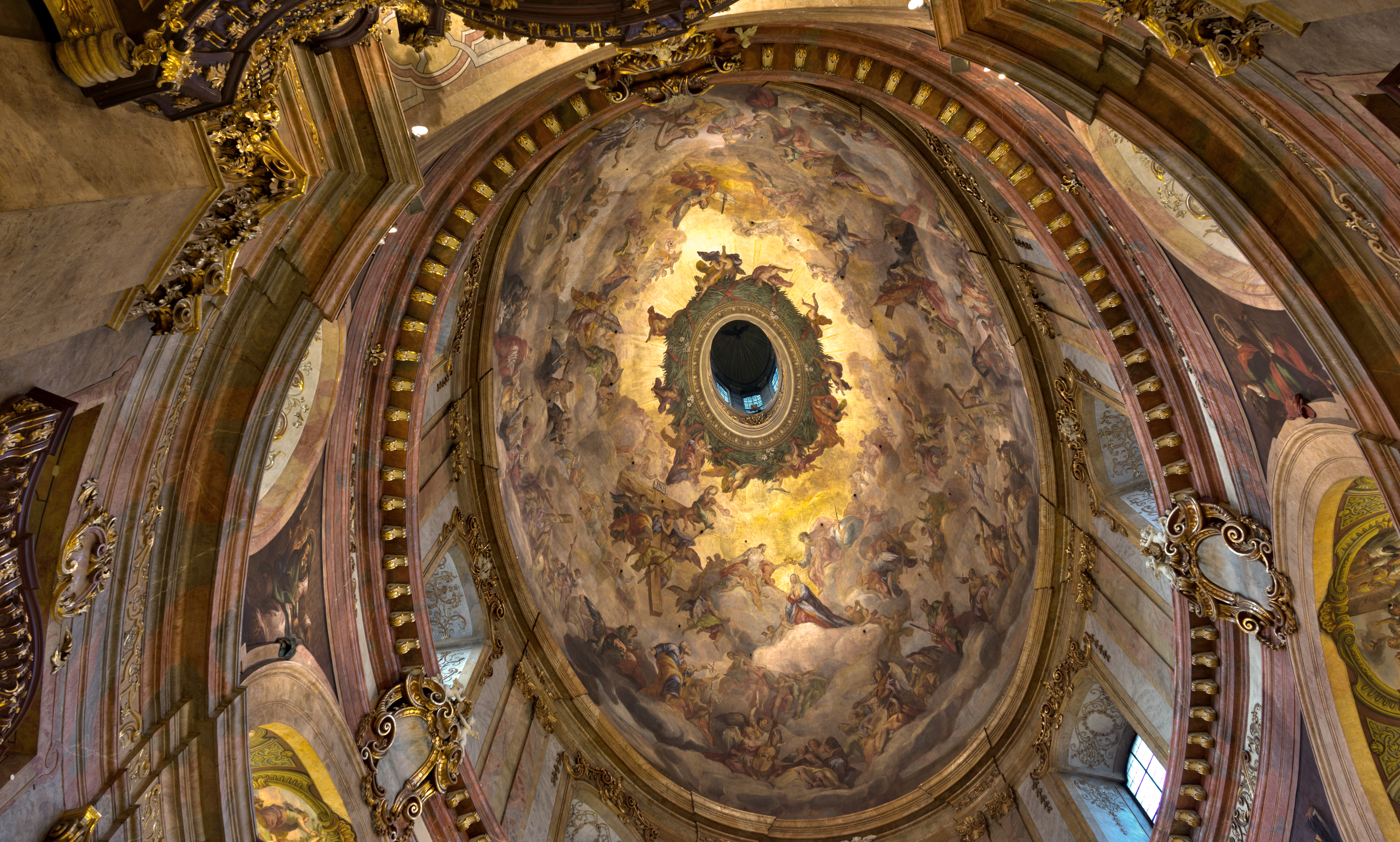
Coronation of Our Lady fresco

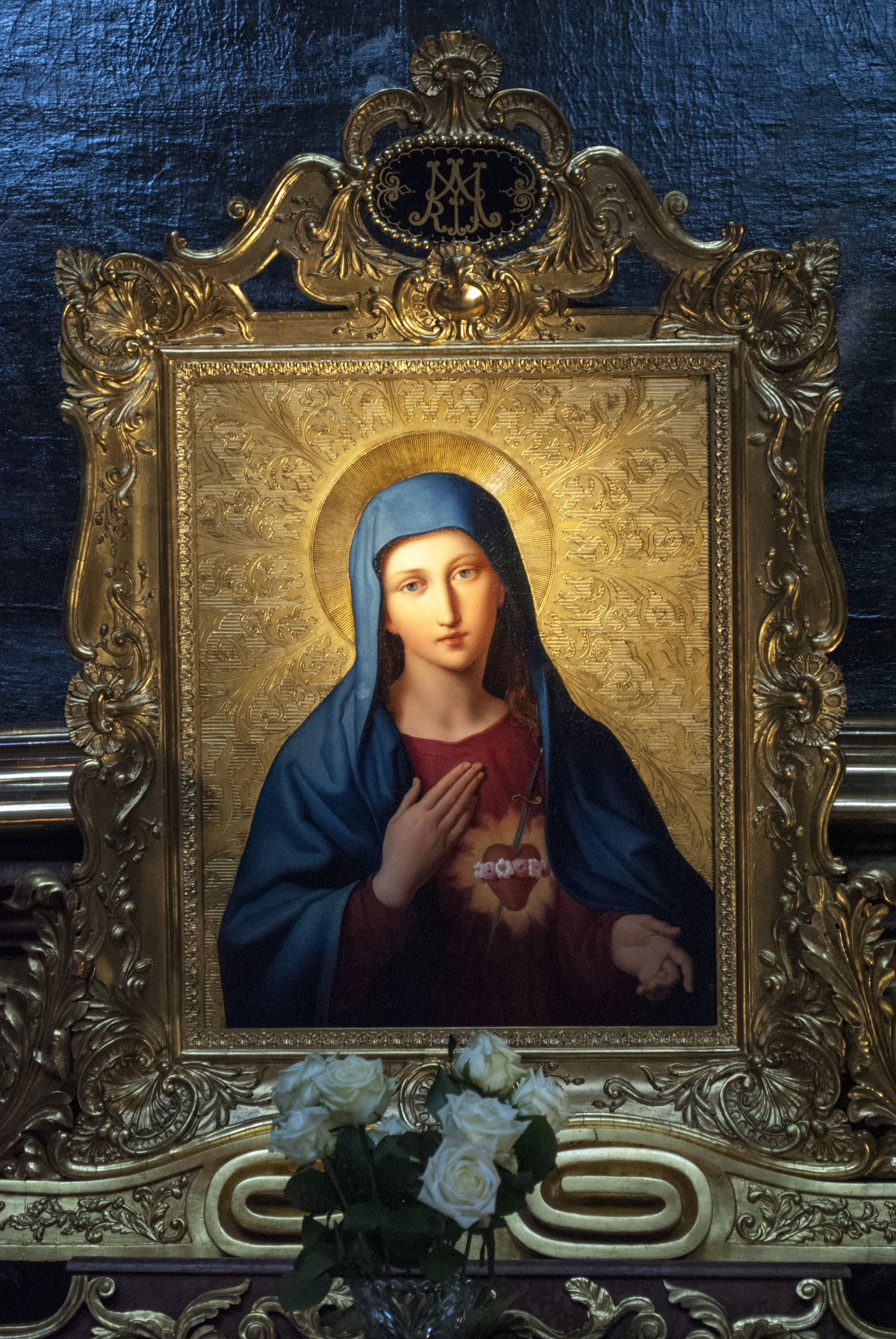
The Heart of Mary in the side chapel of St. Antony

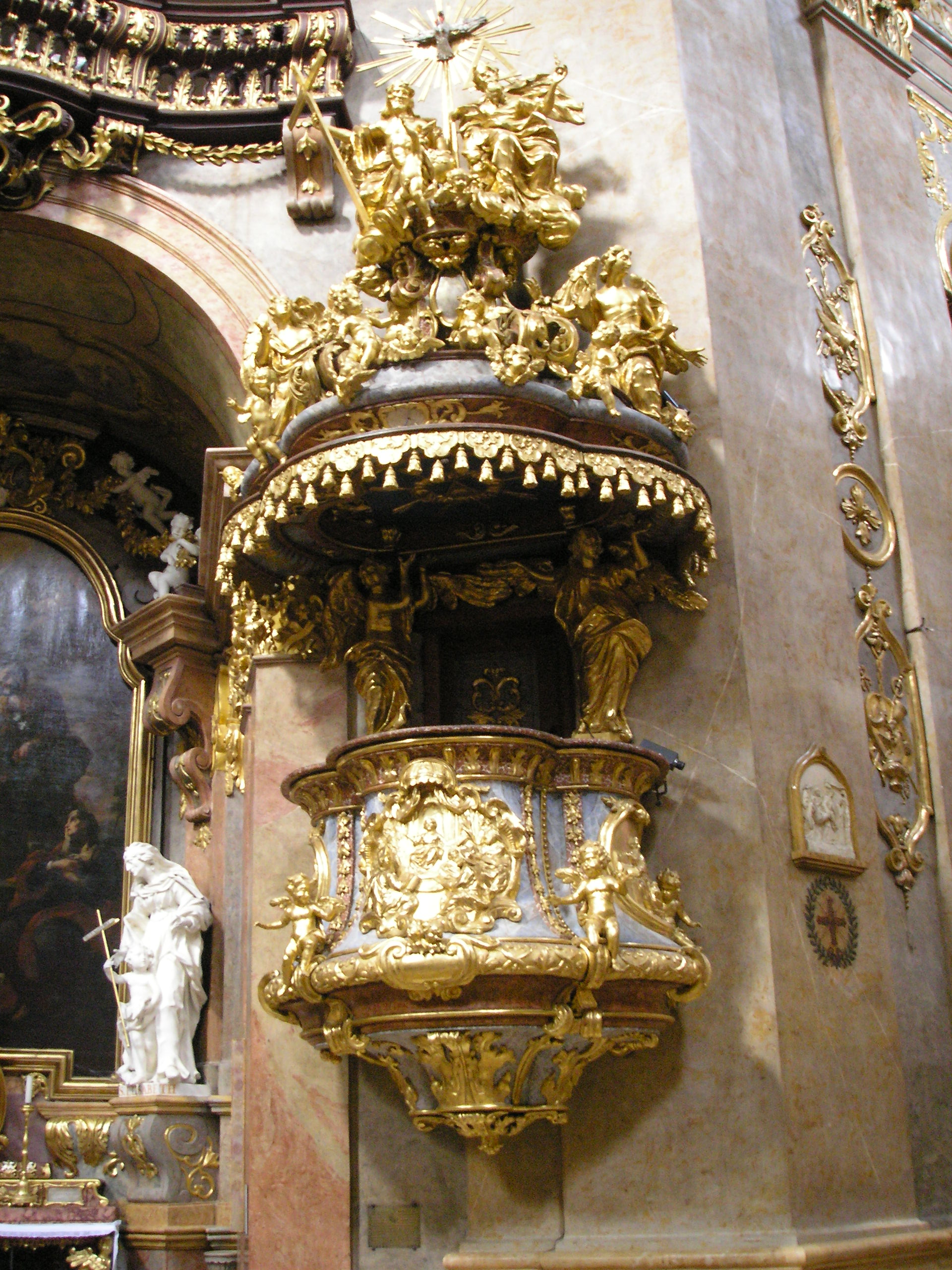
Baroque pulpit

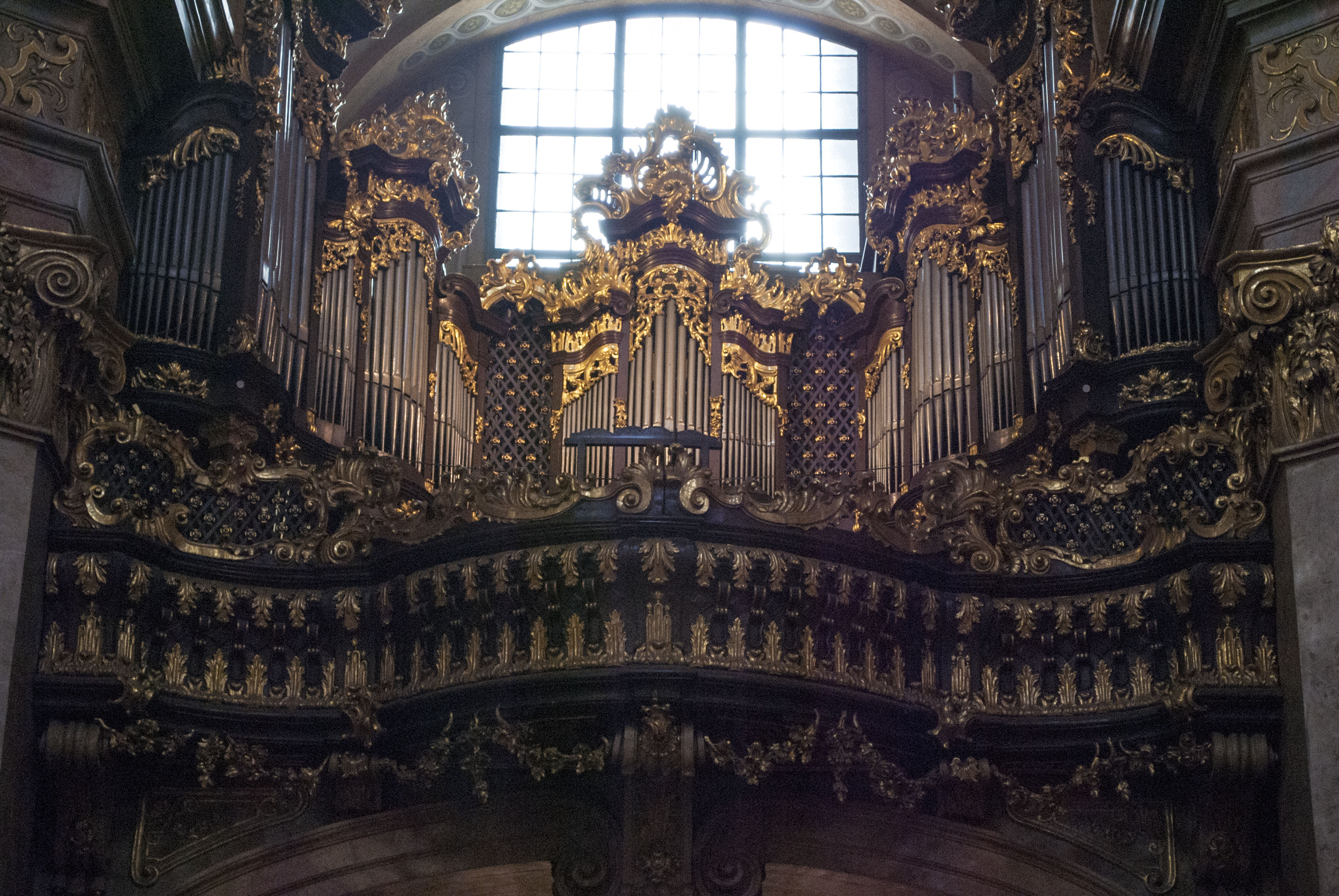
Organ

Groundplan
