= Cathedral of the Holy Trinity, Blaj =

Romanian Greek Catholic cathedral

Cathedral of the Holy Trinity (Romanian: Catedrala Sfânta Treime)
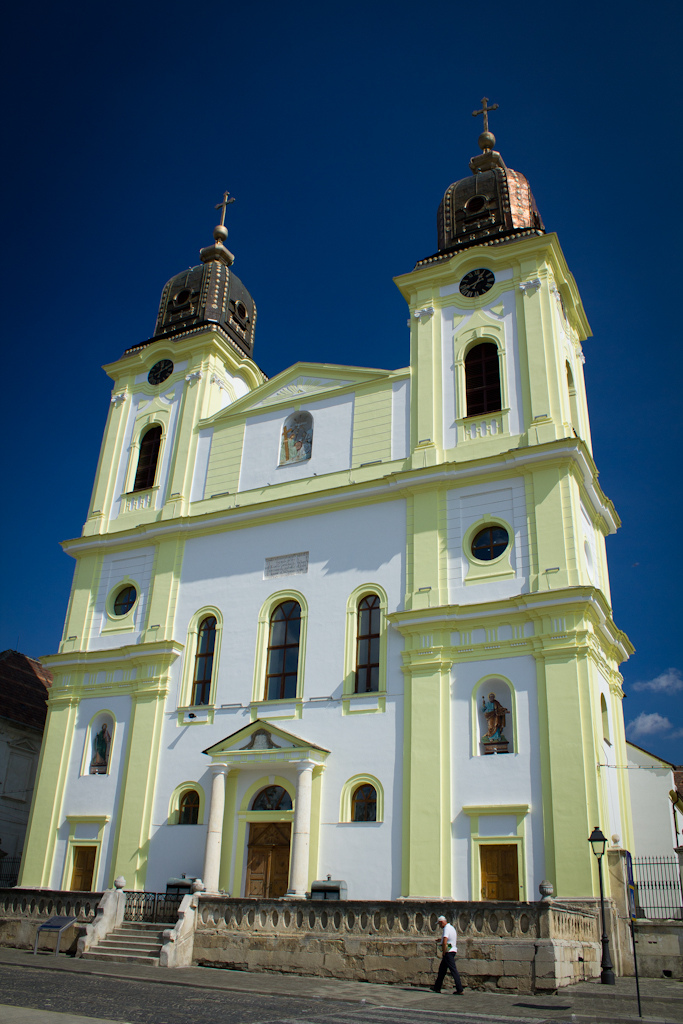
- Holy Trinity Cathedral in Blaj.

Religion
- Affiliation: Romanian Greek Catholic
- Ecclesiastical or organizational status: Major cathedral
- Year consecrated: 1749

Location
- Location: Blaj, Romania
- Interactive map of Cathedral of the Holy Trinity (Romanian: Catedrala Sfânta Treime)
- Coordinates: 46°10′25″N 23°55′23″E

Architecture
- Architects: Anton Erhard Martinelli; Johann Baptist Martinelli
- Type: Church
- Style: Baroque
- Groundbreaking: 1741
- Completed: 1749
- Construction cost: 61,000 florins
- Dome: 2

The Cathedral of the Holy Trinity (Romanian: Catedrala Sfânta Treime) in Blaj, Romania is a Romanian Greek Catholic cathedral commissioned by bishop Inocențiu Micu-Klein in 1738. The church was built by Viennese architects Anton Erhard Martinelli and Johann Baptist Martinelli, being completed in 1749.

The building was extended in 1838, when the two monumental towers were added.

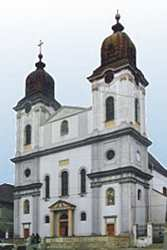
Sfânta Treime Romanian Catholic Metropolitan Cathedral

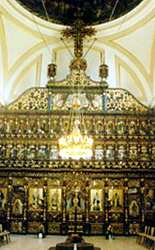
The interior of the Sfânta Treime Romanian Catholic Metropolitan Cathedral
