= St. Rupert's Church, Vienna =

Romanesque church in Vienna, Austria

St. Rupert's Church
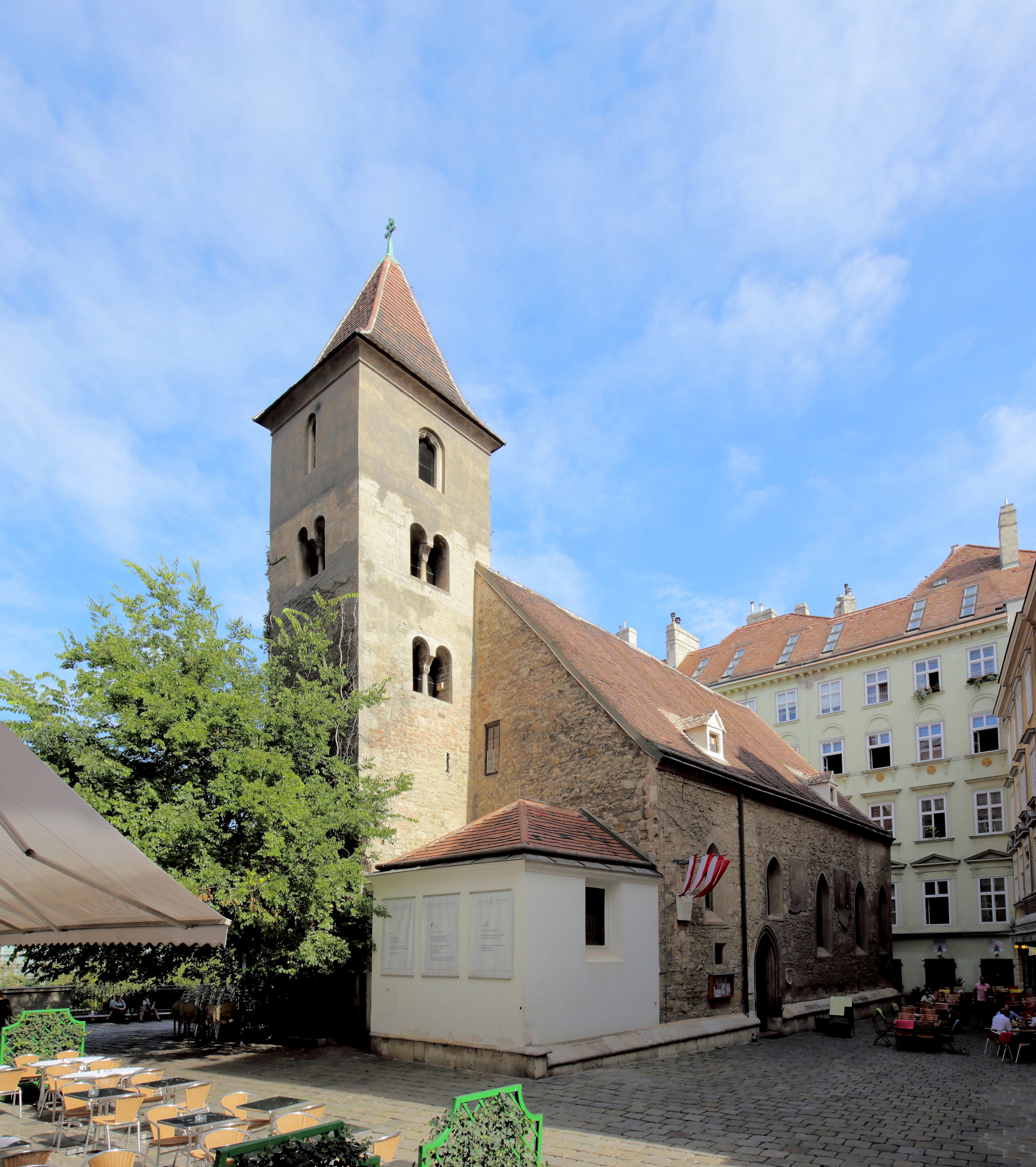
- St. Rupert's Church in Vienna, Austria

- Location within Vienna Location within Austria

Religion
- Affiliation: Catholic Church
- Ecclesiastical or organisational status: Active
- Leadership: P. Hans Brandl, SJ

Location
- Location: Vienna, Austria
- State: Vienna
- Coordinates: 48.211944°N 16.374444°E

Architecture
- Type: Church
- Style: Romanesque, Baroque
- Completed: 740

Specifications
- Direction of façade: NWbW
- Capacity: 100
- Length: 27 m (89 ft)
- Width: 13 m (43 ft)

Website
- www.ruprechtskirche.at

St. Rupert's Church (German: Ruprechtskirche) is a Romanesque church in Vienna, Austria. Traditionally considered to be the oldest church in the city, St. Rupert's Church is dedicated to Saint Rupert of Salzburg, patron saint of the salt merchants of Vienna. The church is located in one of the oldest parts of the city, the section of the Roman Vindobona.

There is currently some debate whether the Ruprechtskirche is truly the oldest church in Vienna. Discoveries of old foundations under the St. Peter's Church and old graves under the St. Stephen's Cathedral have disputed the certainty of this label.

== History ==
According to legend, the church was founded by Cunald and Gisalrich, companions of Rupert during his occupation of the seat of bishop of Salzburg. However, because Salzburg had influence over religious issues in Vienna between 796 and 829, it is more probable that it was founded in this period.

The first reference to the church in historical documentation is in a document of 1200 when Duke Heinrich II Jasomirgott describes a gift to the Schottenstift church. The document also mentions the Ruprechtskirche, which is labeled the oldest in the city.

After the destruction of the Roman settlement, the core part of the city grew in the area near the church. It was the seat of the religious administration before that function was transferred to the Stephansdom in 1147.

During the Middle Ages, the church was the seat of the Salt Office (Salzamt), which distributed salt to individual buyers and ensured its quality. The church overlooks the jetty of the salt merchants on the Danube channel.

The ivy-covered church has been rebuilt and altered many times in its history. In 1276, it was damaged by fire and modified. The choir dates from the 13th century, while the southern nave dates from the 15th century. In 1622, it was redecorated in Baroque style. It was also somewhat damaged by shellfire during World War II and affected by the demolition of the nearby ruins of another building. In the middle of the apse, there are two Romanesque stained-glass windows.

== Other features ==
The oldest bells in Vienna are located in the church, dating from around 1280.

The oldest glass window panes (dating from approximately 1370) can be found in the church. They depict a crucified Christ and the Madonna with baby.

A statue of Saint Rupert is located in the north part of the main tower.

The arch on the western gallery has a plaque with the label “AEIOU 1439”, an undecyphered motto of Emperor Frederick III. The plaque was designed to commemorate the entrance of the emperor to Vienna on December 6, 1439. According to tradition, AEIOU stands for (in Latin) "AUSTRIAE EST IMPERARE ORBI UNIVERSO" or in German "ALLES ERDREICH IST OESTERREICH UNTERTAN", both meaning "The whole world is subject to Austria"

A relic of the sarcophagus of Saint Vitalis is located in the church containing the supposed remains of a Christian victim from the Roman catacombs. This memorial of victimization has special meaning in modern times because the Gestapo headquarters, which was used for torture and the organization of Jewish deportations, was located nearby in the Morzinplatz square.

== Gallery ==
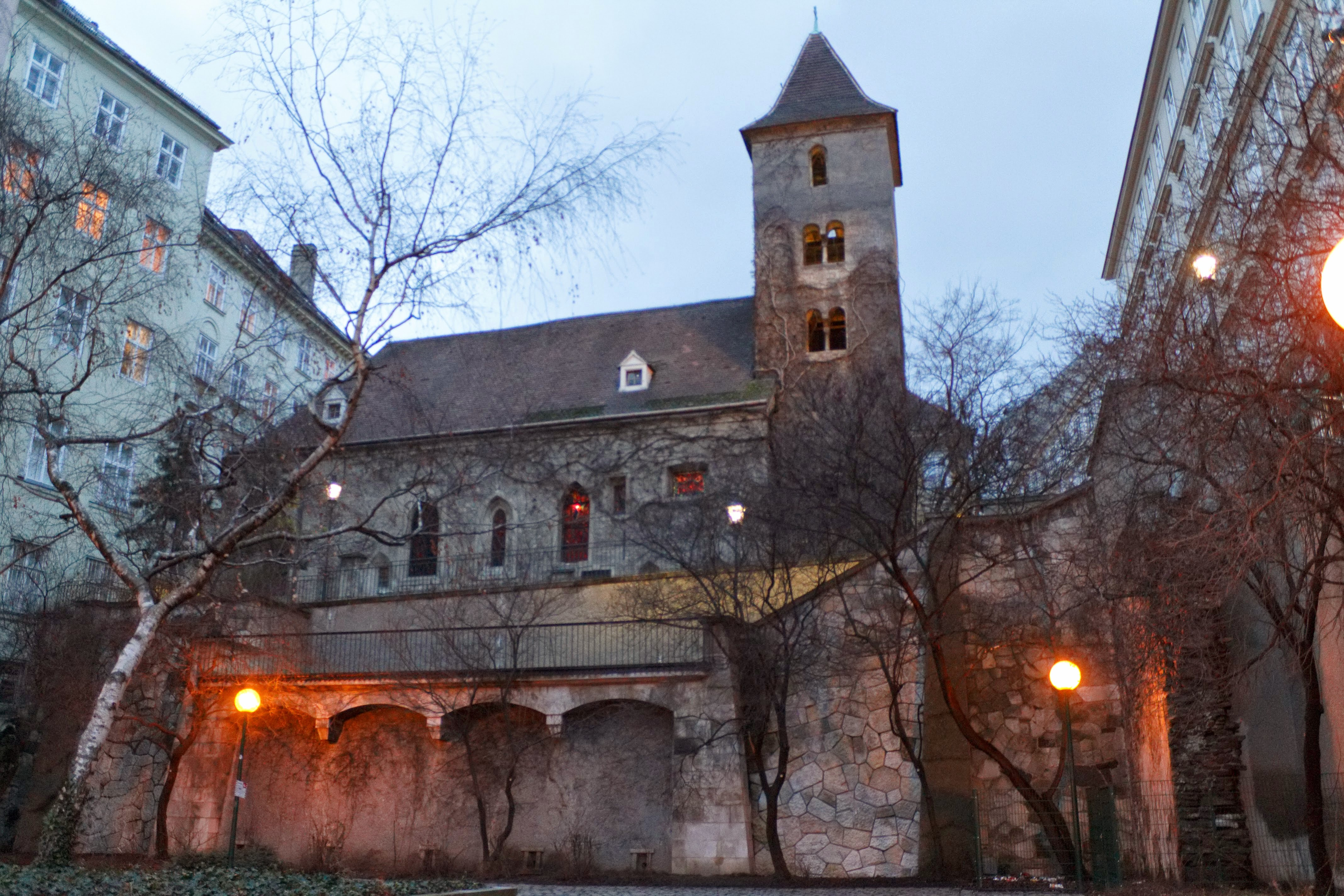
St Rupert's

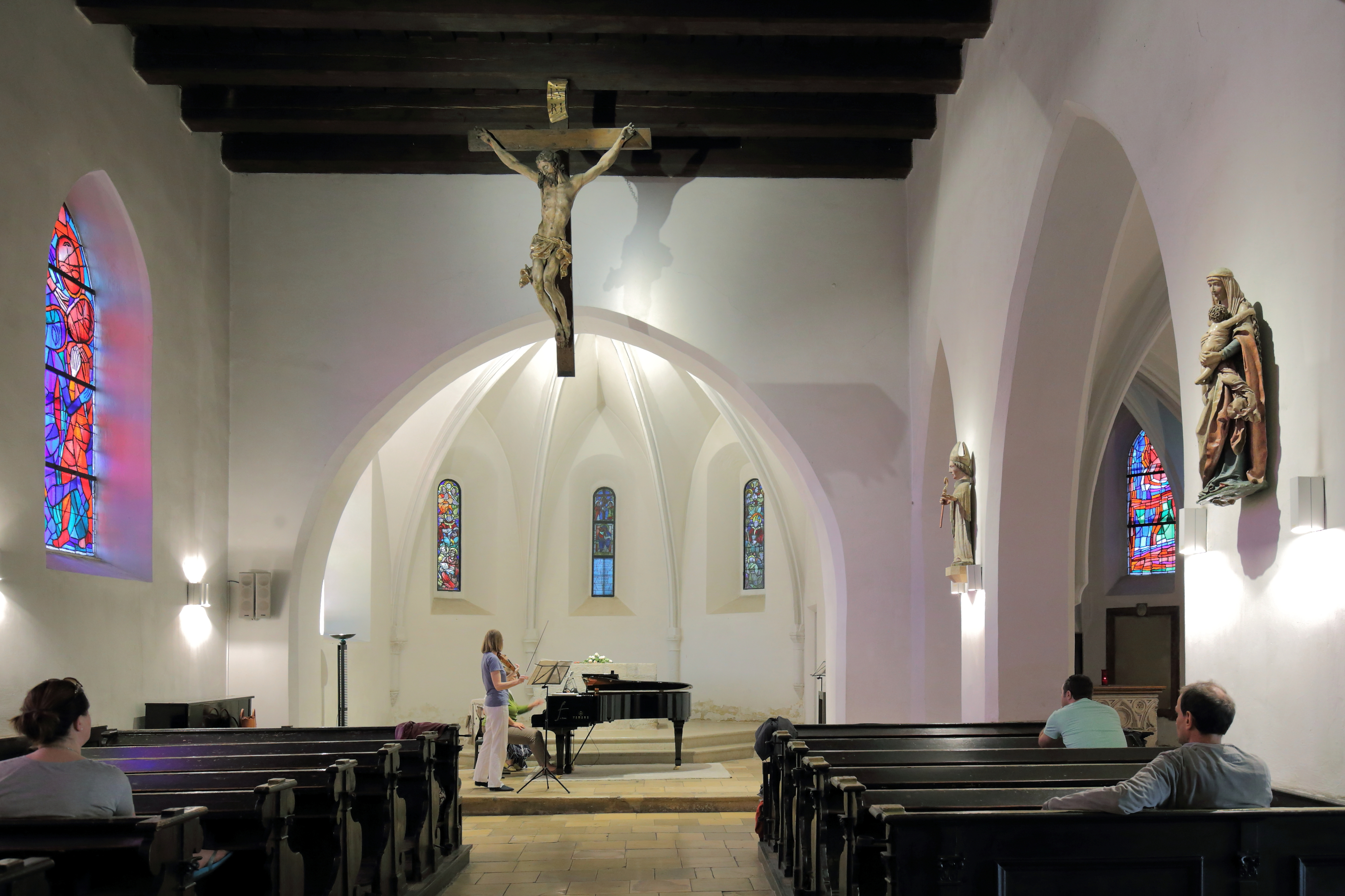
Interior

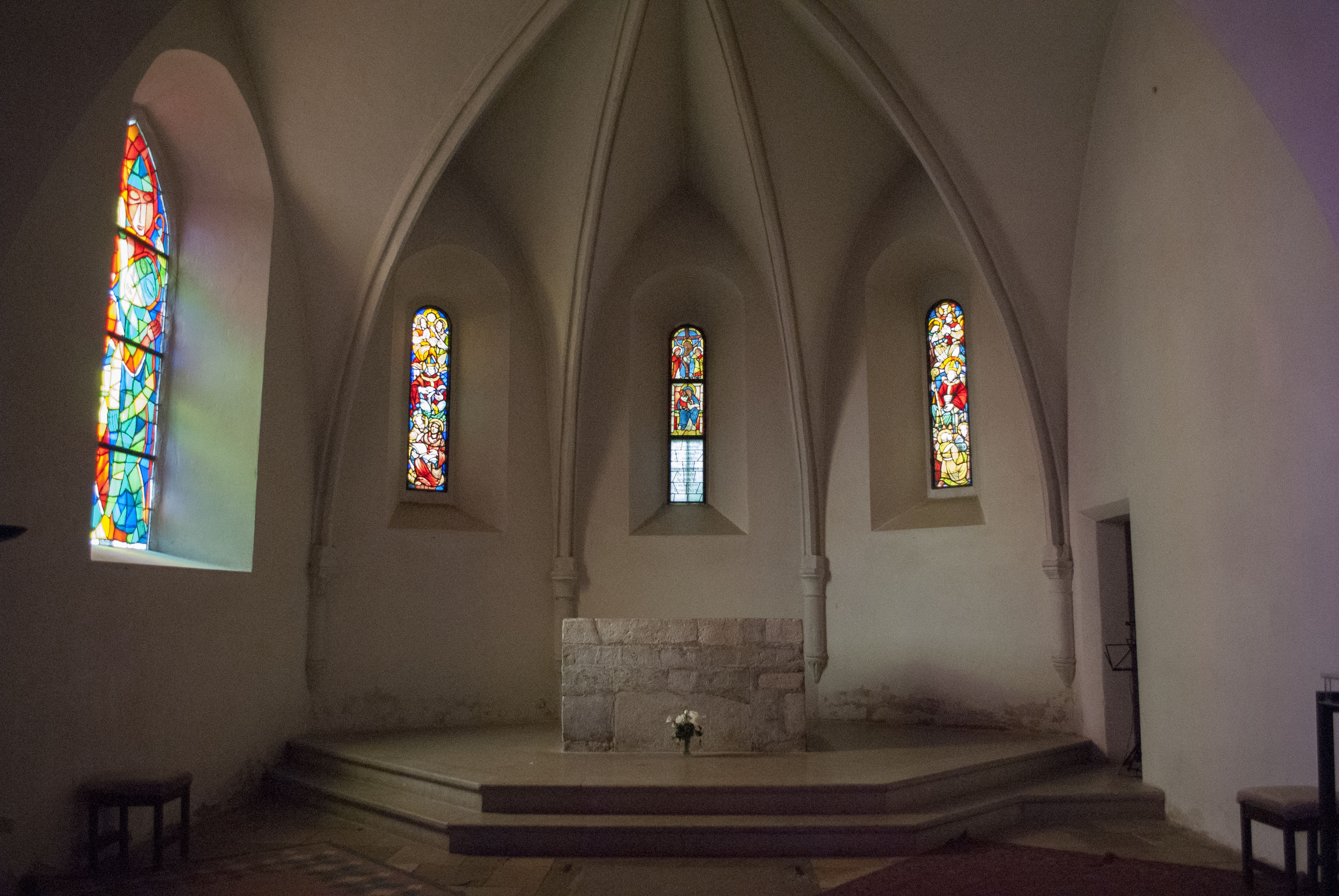
Altar

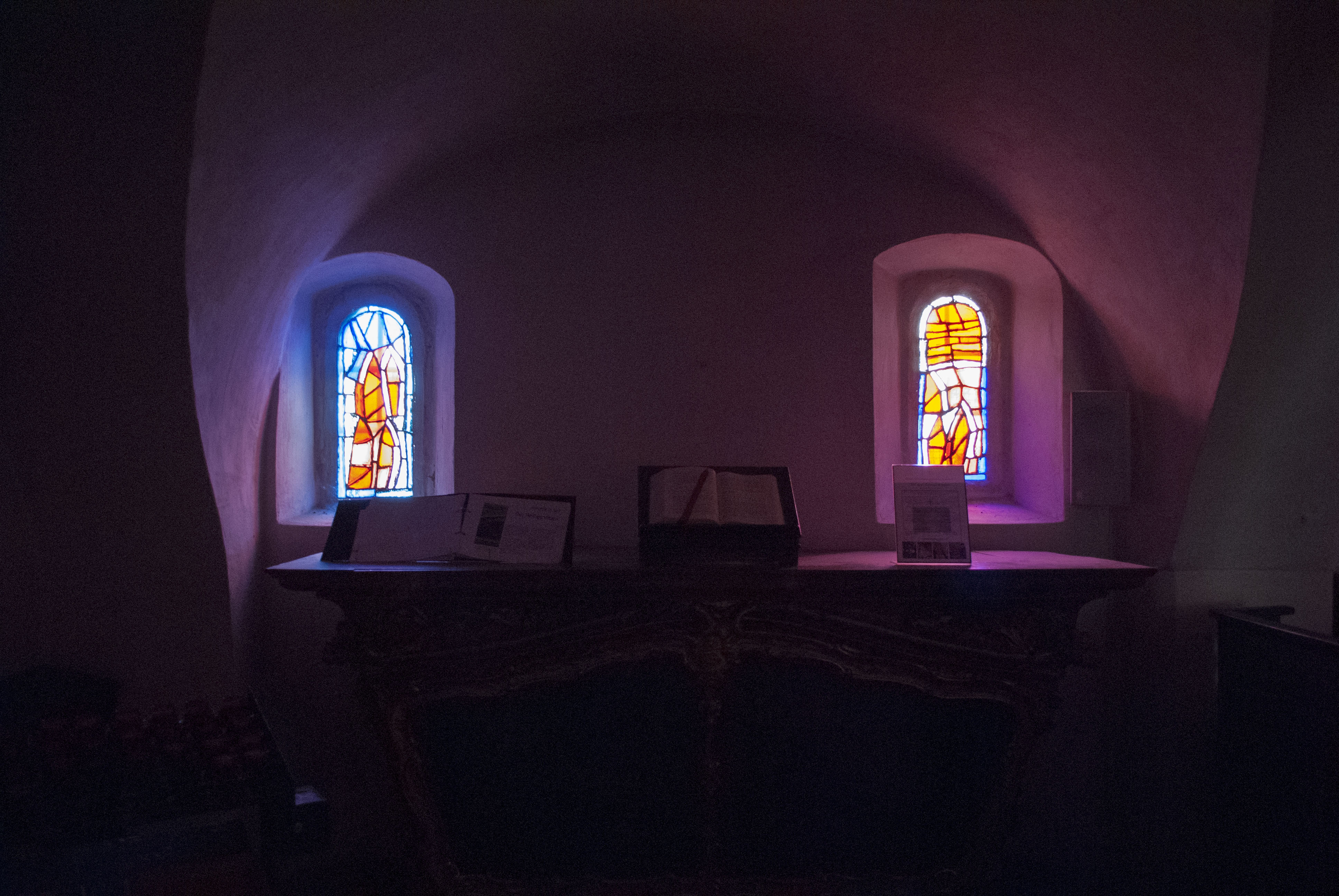
Interior

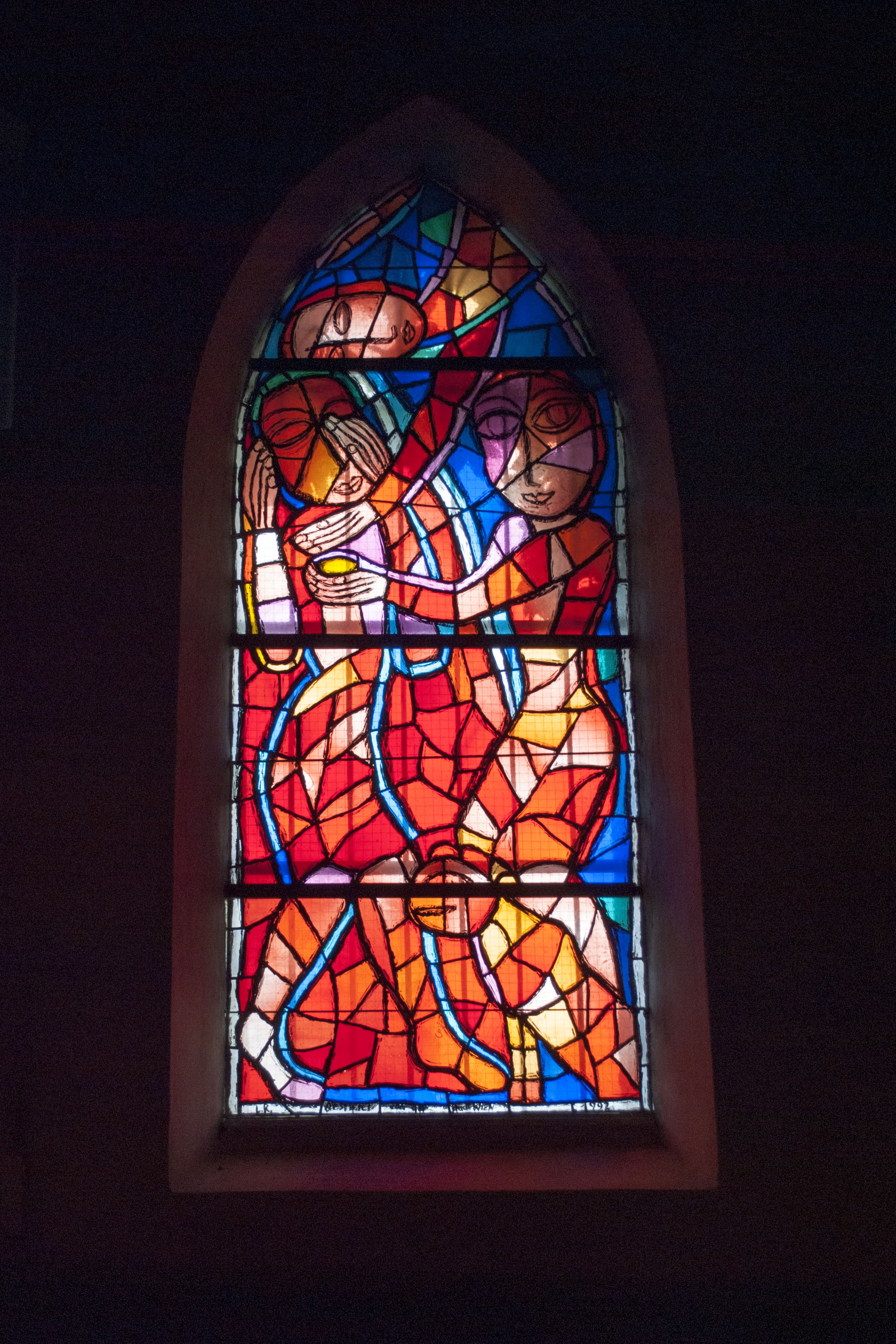
Stained glass window

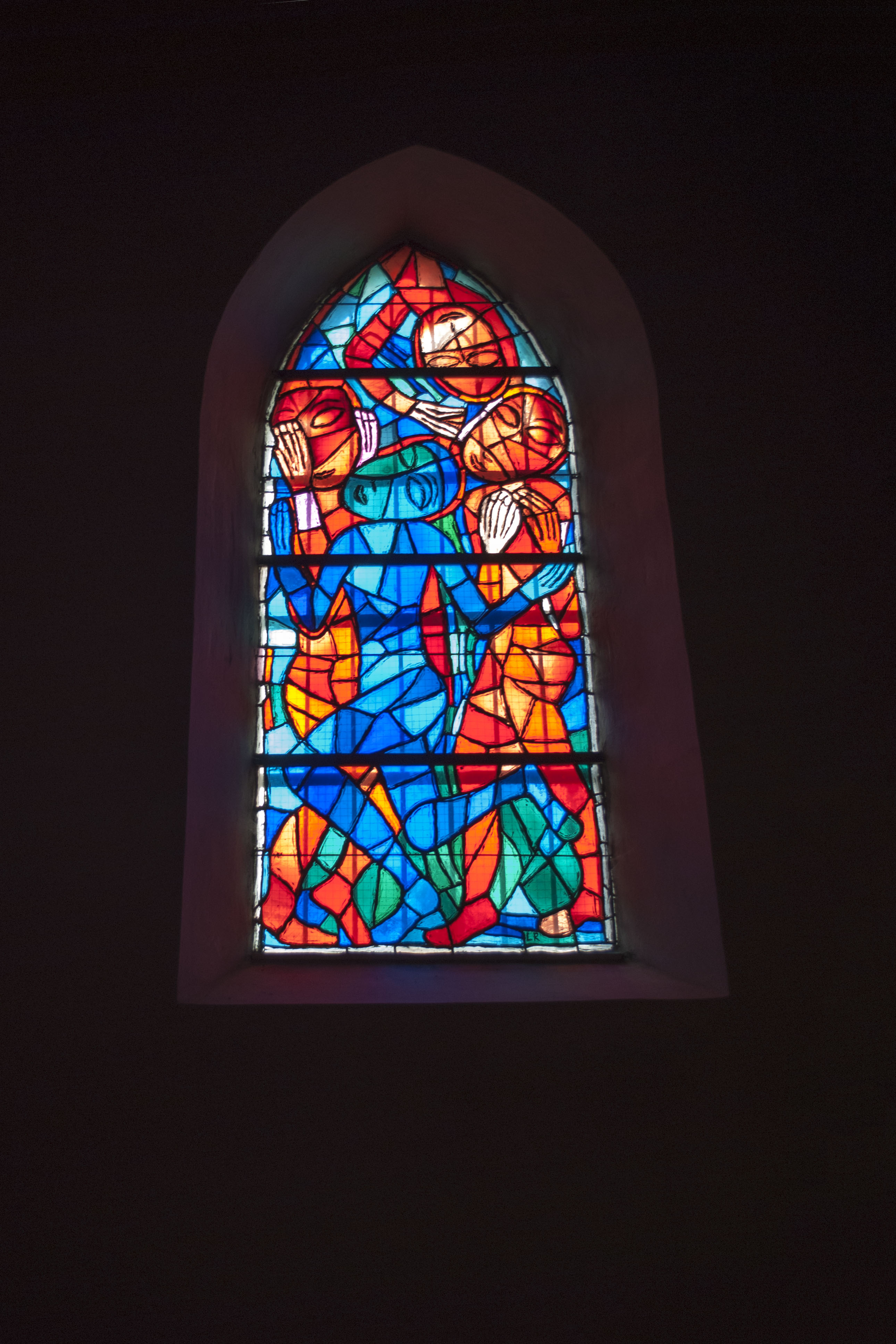
Stained glass window

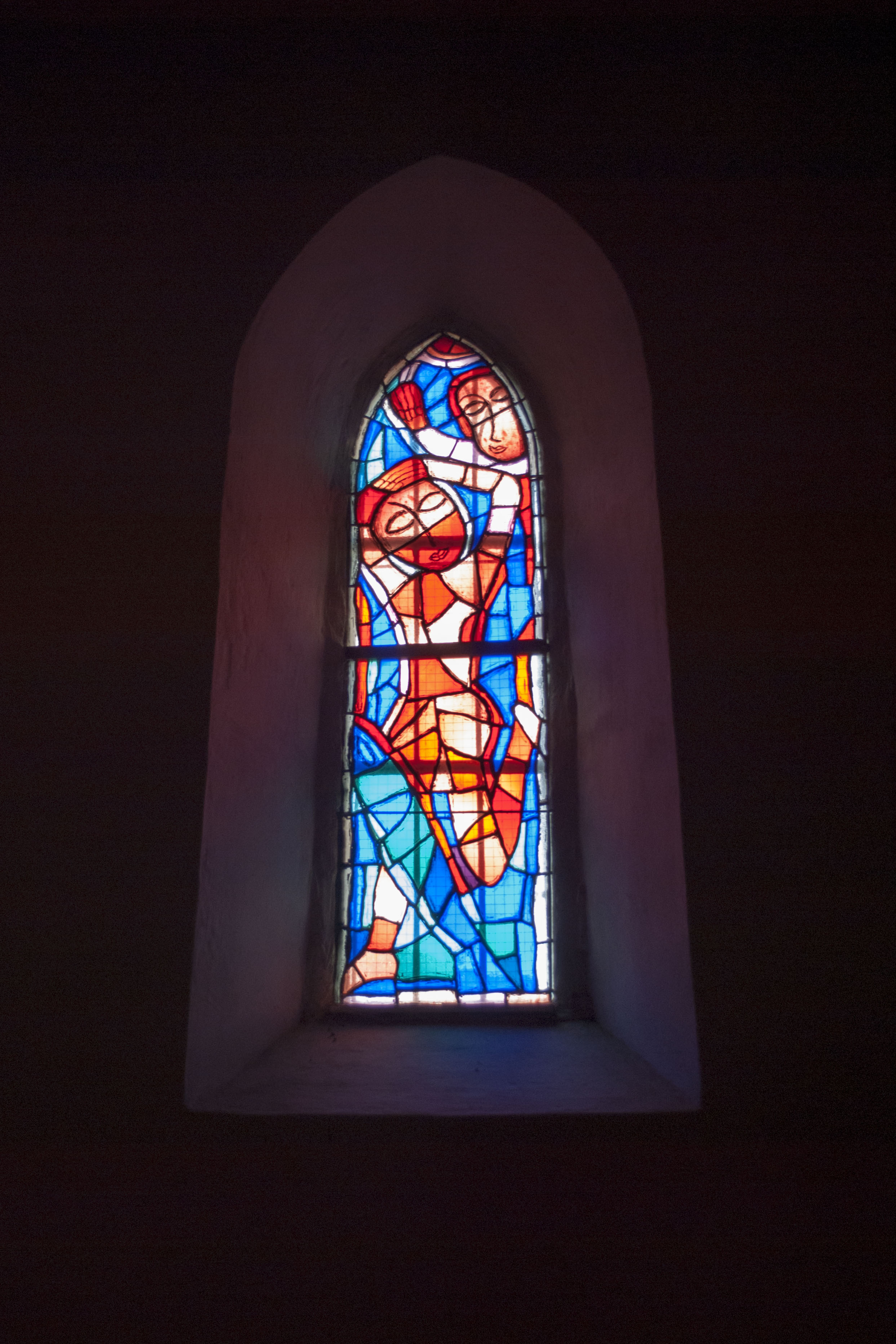
Stained glass window

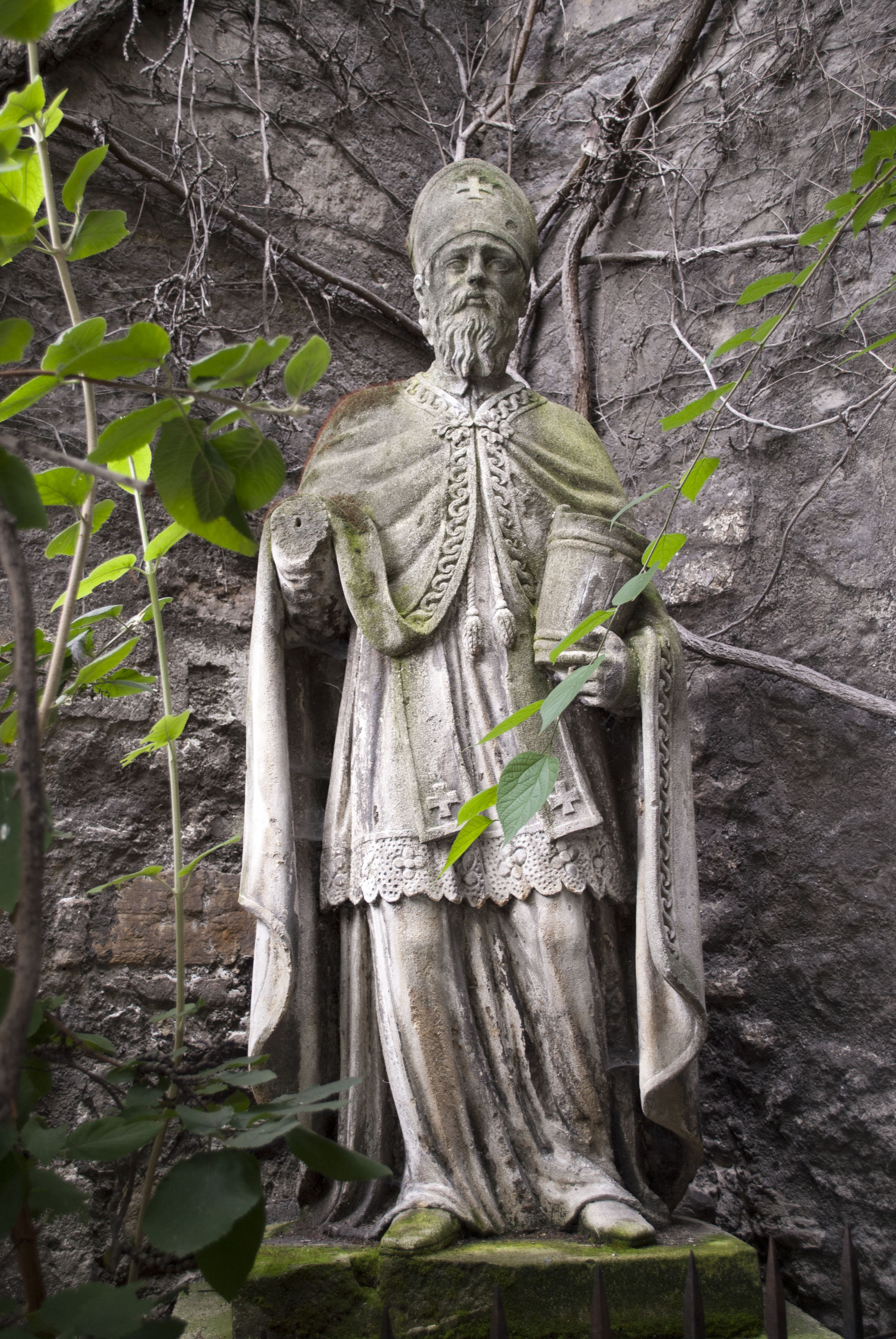
Statue of St. Rupert

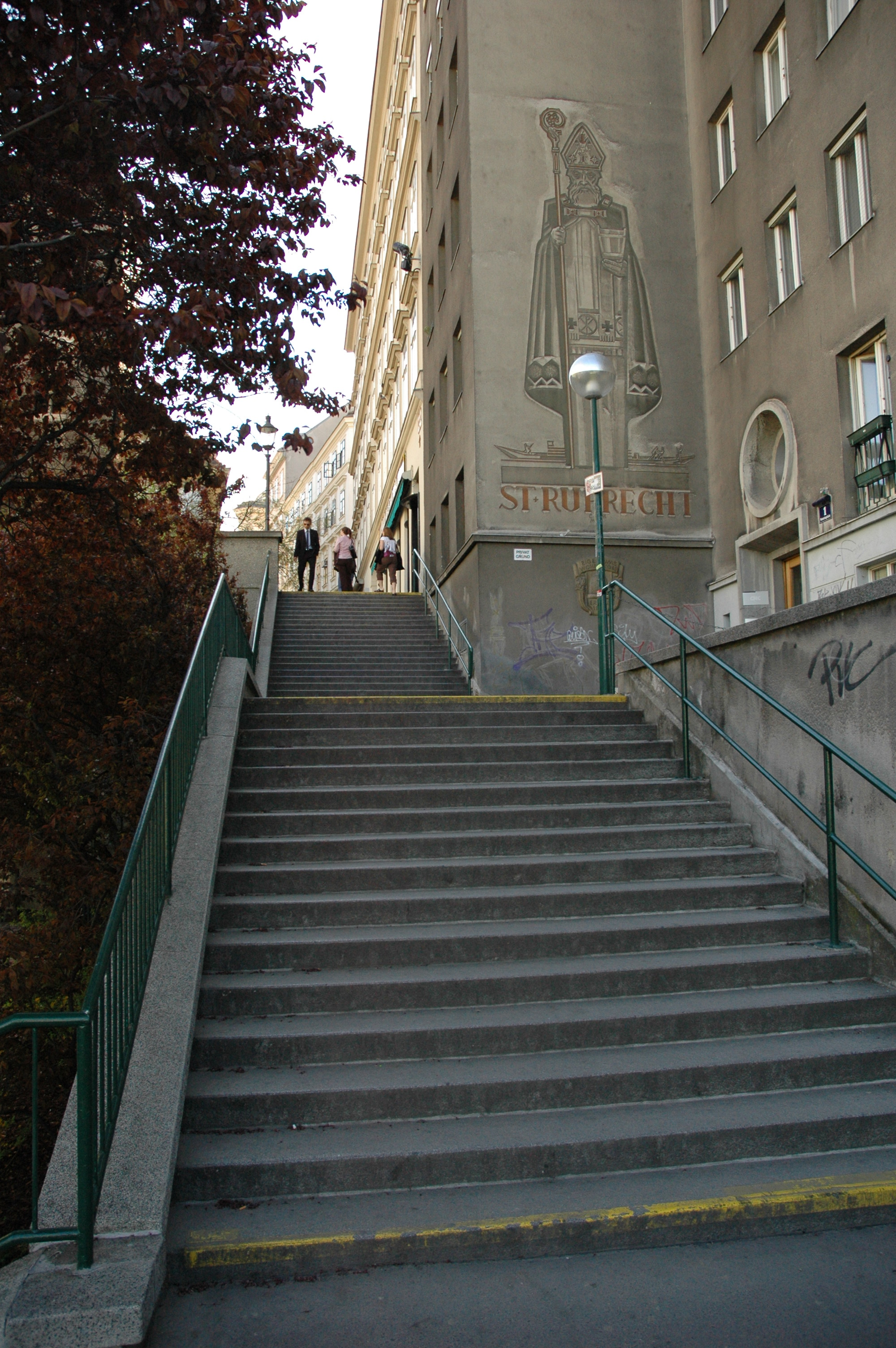
The Ruprecht staircase connects the Morzinplatz with the Ruprechtsplatz

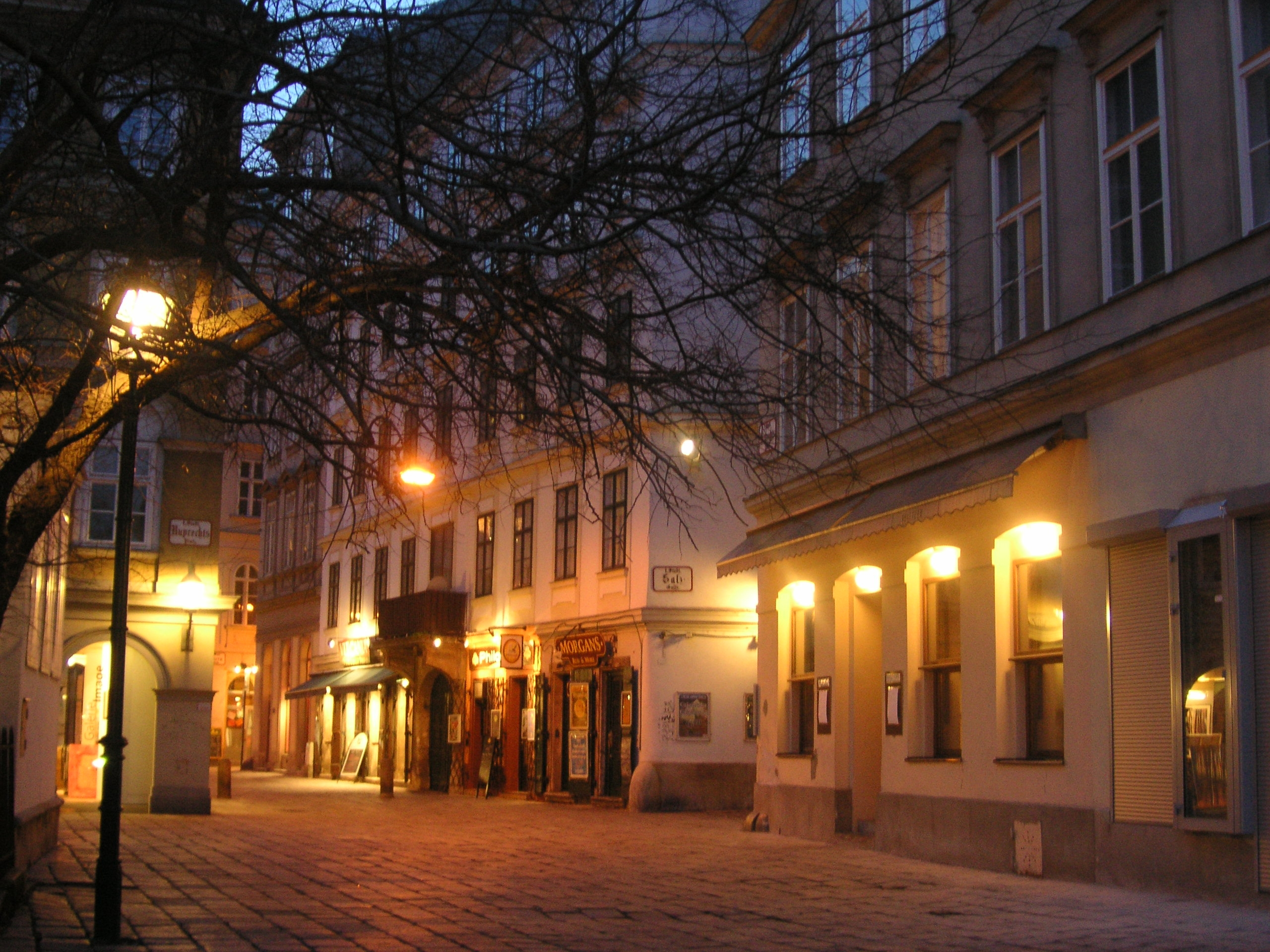
The little squares and lanes surrounding the Ruprechtskirche belong to the oldest part of Vienna

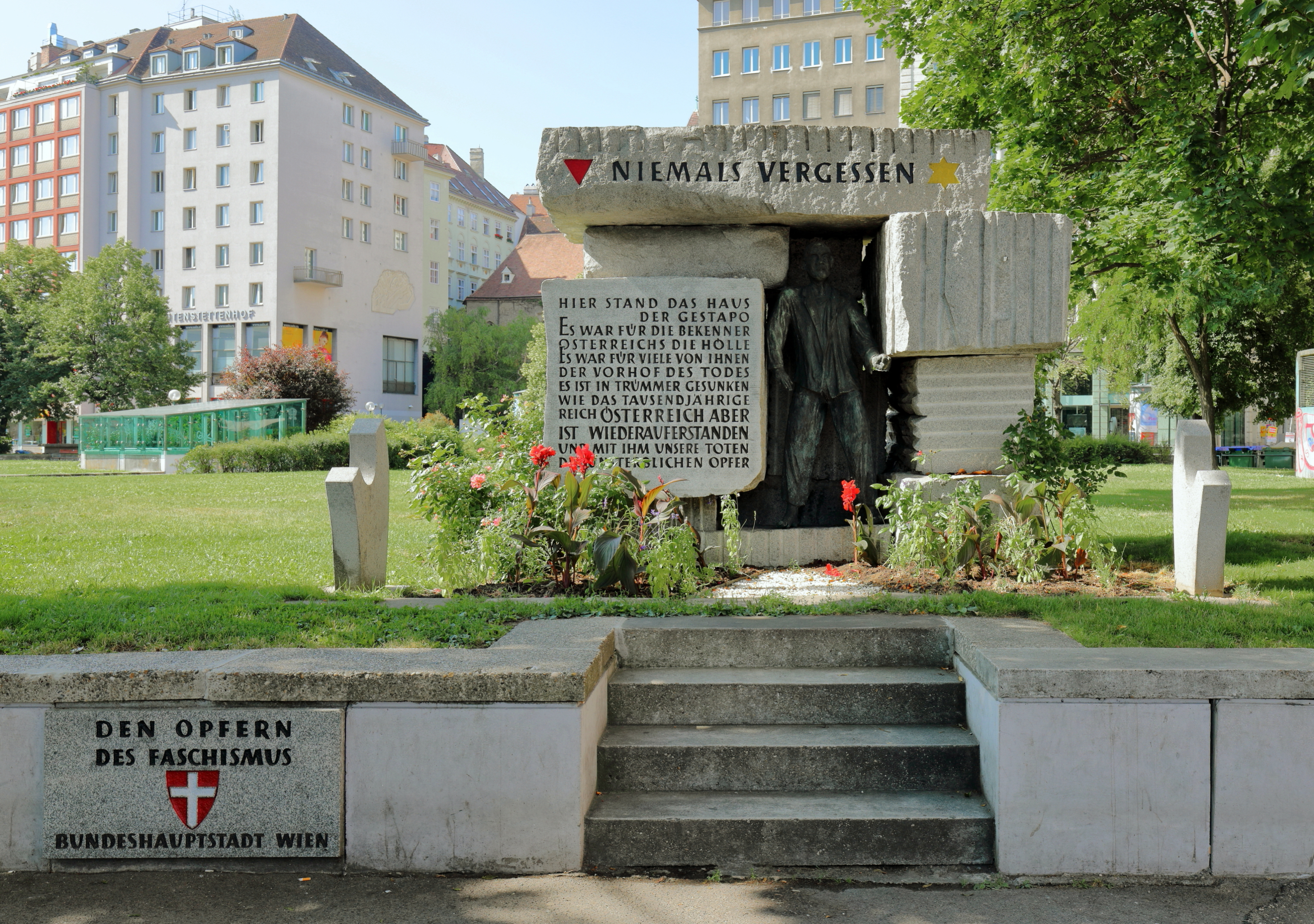
Remembrance of the victims of the Gestapo
