= Matthias Steinl =

Austrian painter, architect, sculptor and designer

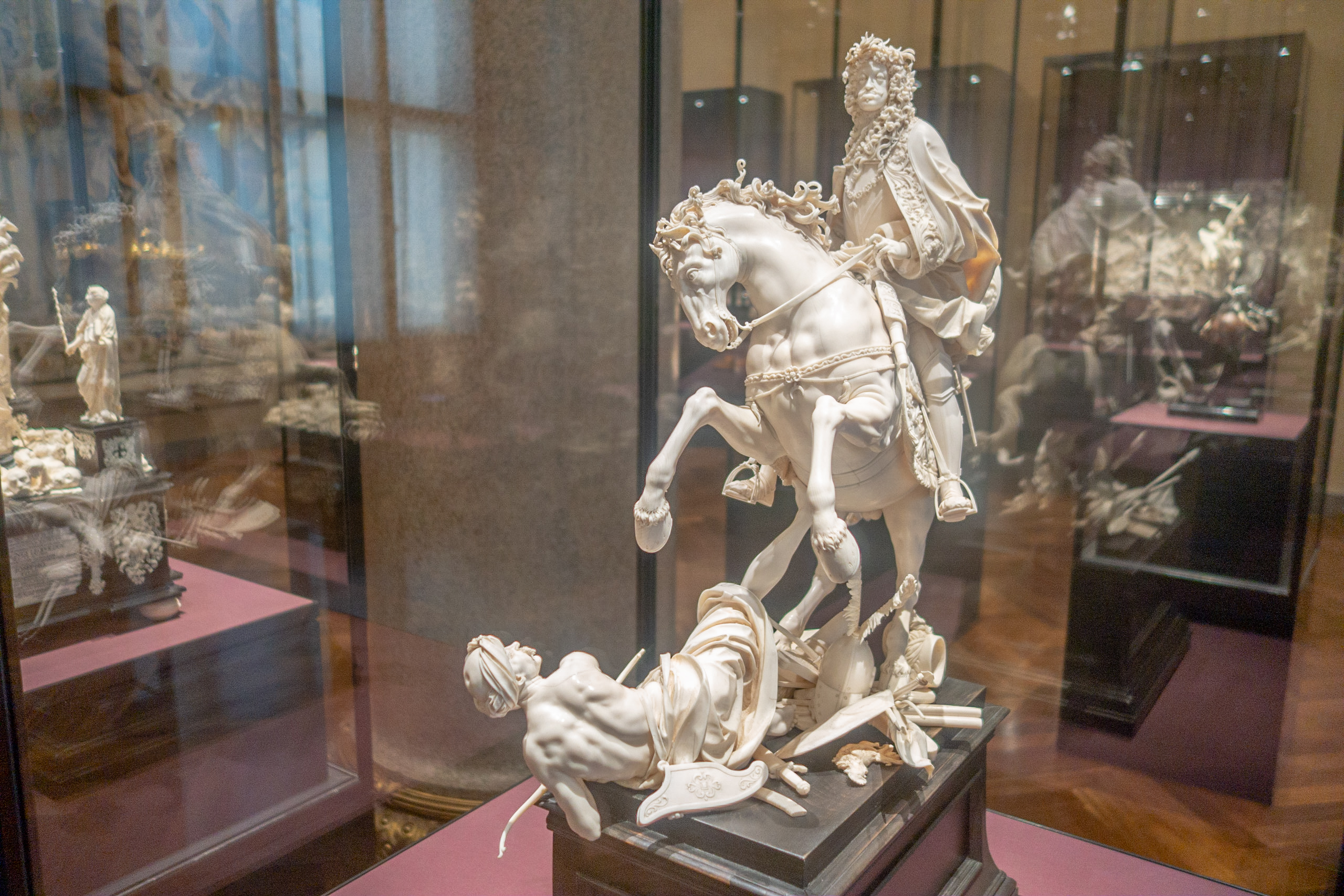
King Joseph I as Victor over the Furor, 1693

Matthias Steinl (otherwise Steindel, Staindle, Steindl or Stinle) (c. 1644–18 April 1727) was an Austrian painter, architect and designer, and one of the country's best known Baroque sculptors. Together with Johann Bernhard Fischer von Erlach (1656–1723) and his rival Johann Lukas von Hildebrandt (1668–1765), Steinl may be considered one of the most influential architects to introduce the High Baroque style to Austria.

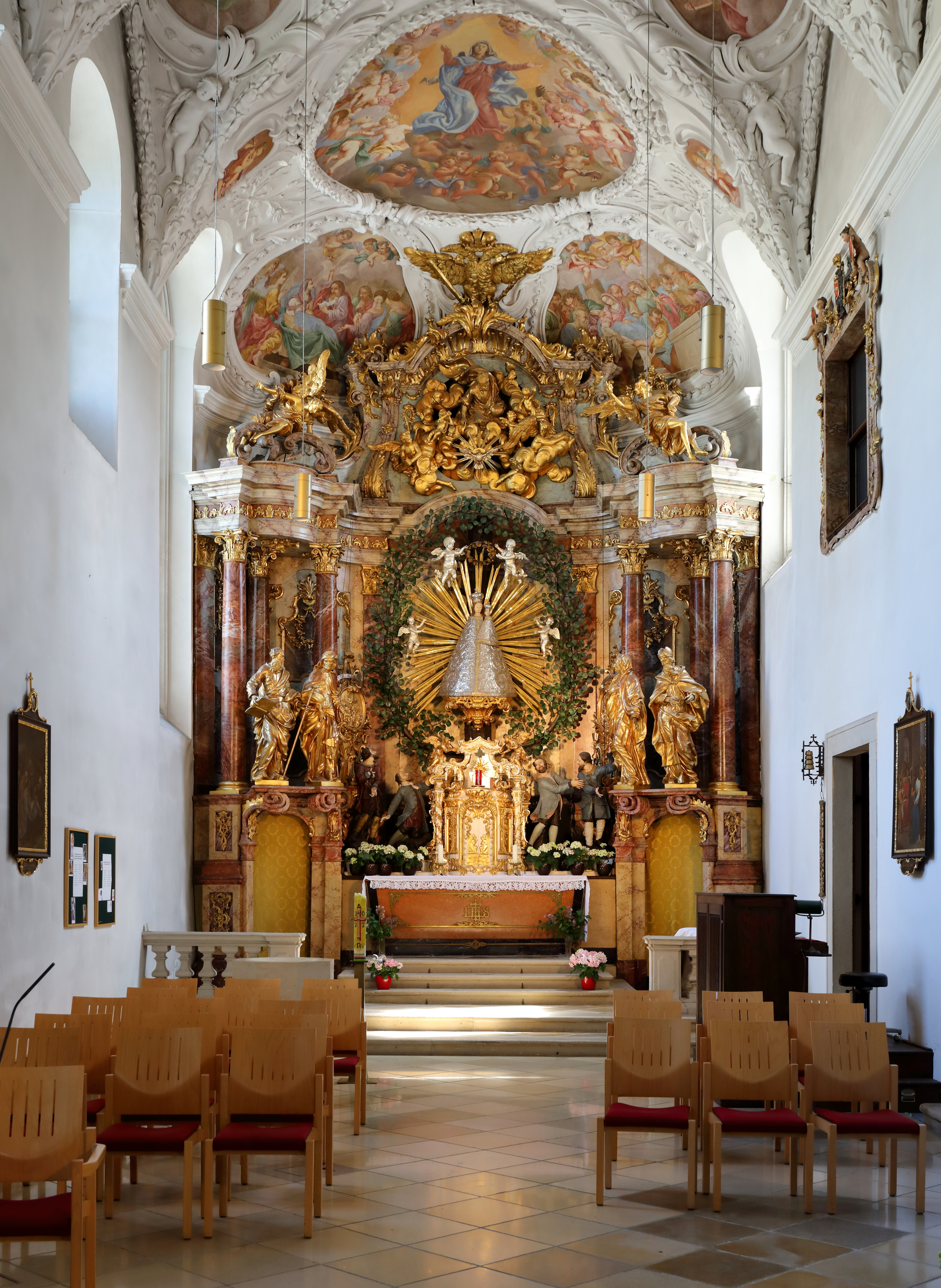
High altar of the parish and pilgrimage church of Maria Hietzing in Vienna (1698)

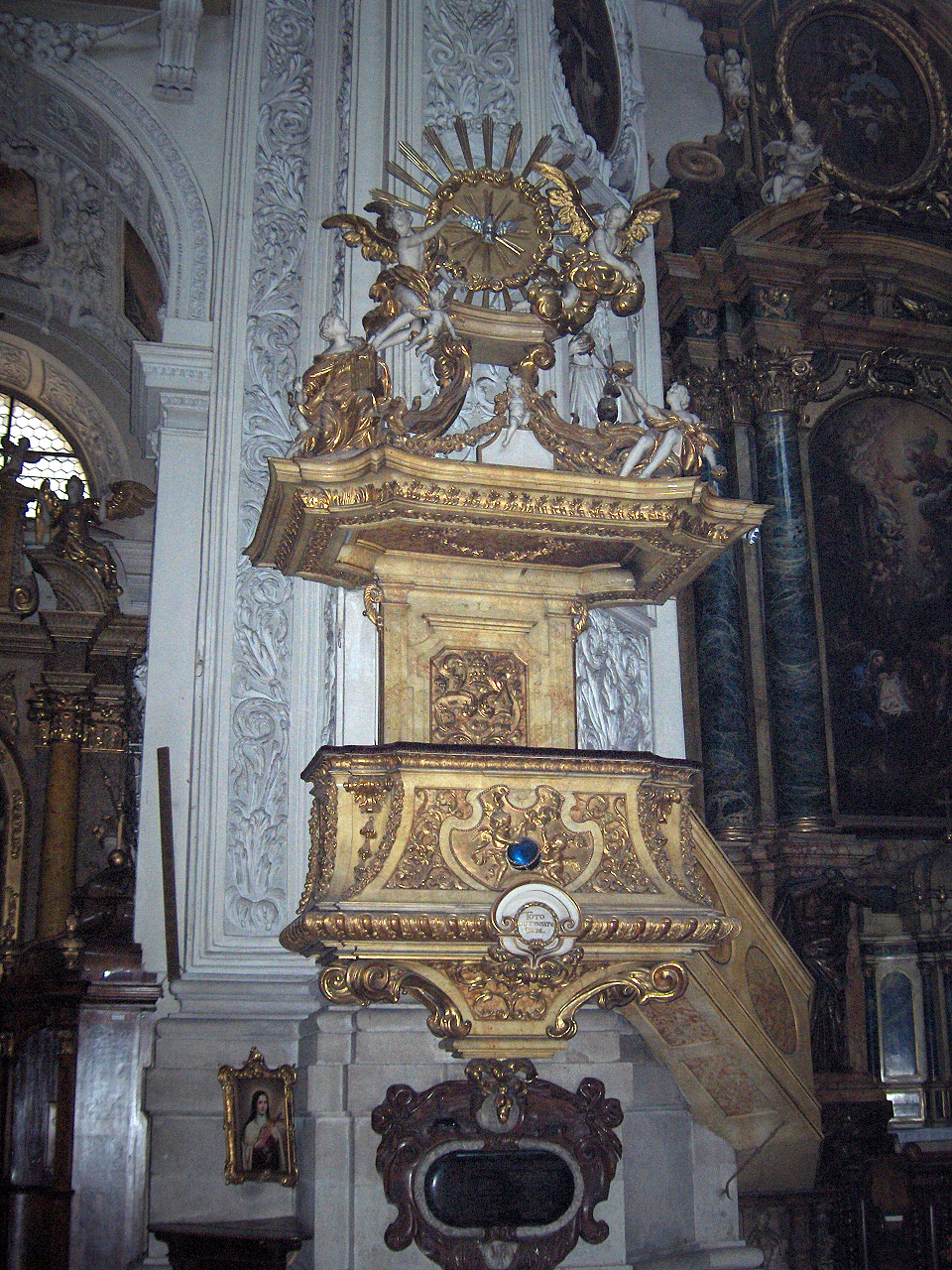
Pulpit of the Dominican Church in Vienna

He probably originated from the area around Salzburg and probably trained as a craftsman and artist in Austria, although he may have learned to sculpt in the Netherlands and in Prague.

The Victoria and Albert Museum in London has one of his earliest identified sculptures, an ivory statuette of a triton (c.1670-1675).

He was definitely employed in the 1670s as a sculptor in Leubus Abbey (now Lubiąż) in the Lower Silesian Voivodeship, where he took over the workshop of the deceased sculptor Matthias Knote, whose widow he married in 1677. Most of his works here (the main altar, side altars, the pulpit and the choir stalls) were destroyed after World War II.

Steinl directed this workshop till 1682, when he moved to Breslau, where the prince-bishop recommended him to the court in Vienna. During his stay in Breslau he provided the sculptures on the high altar of Heinrichau Abbey (now Henryków). He also started as a designer sketching cartouches, garlands and tendrils.

In 1688 in Vienna he became the ivory engraver for the emperor. From this period dates the exceptional carving Allegory of the elements water and air, made out of a walrus tusk (c. 1688-1690); and the ivory equestrian statues of Leopold I (1690–1693) and Joseph I (dated 1693)

From the 1690s Steinl also directed an important sculpture workshop in Vienna that produced many religious objects, among them the following:

- the interior decoration for the chapel of the Hofburg (now destroyed);
- the Dominican church in Vienna: the pulpit (1700);
- the Peterskirche in Vienna: the pulpit, side altars, pews and confessionals (1726) (he had already designed the dome of this church in 1715-16);
- the Franciscan church in Vienna: the altar;
- the pilgrimage church of Hietzing, Vienna: the high altar and two side altars (1698);
- the statue Immaculata (1688), now at the Liebighaus in Frankfurt am Main;
- St. Stephen's Cathedral, Vienna: two altars (1700 and 1708) with stone sculptures.

Around 1688, Steinl became more interested in architecture. The Swedish National Museum of Fine Arts in Stockholm has a design by him of a belvedere for Schönbrunn Palace in Vienna. He also worked on a design for Starhemberg Palace (1702), also near Vienna.

He was one of the first to use the Late Baroque style, in the manner of Francesco Borromini, in Austria, as architect of the church of Laxenburg, close to Vienna, although the level of his contribution here has been disputed. This church was the first building north of the Alps to contain swung façade elements characteristic of the High Baroque. It was built between 1693 and 1703 by Carlo Antonio Carlone and continued between 1703 and 1724 by Steinl. The rich Baroque façade of the Carmelite church in Sankt Pölten, Austria, was built by the famous Baroque architect Jakob Prandtauer (c. 1708), but Steinl seems to have been involved in the design. His tower façade of the Dorotheakirche (1702–1704) in Vienna no longer exists.

His architectonic designs were mostly realised by Josef Munggenast (1680–1741), nephew of Jakob Prandtauer.

Around this period Steinl seems largely to have ceased his direct participation in his sculpture workshop, but he still produced the occasional piece, as attested by the statues for the crypt altar of the Capuchin church in Vienna (c. 1715). He also continued to work as imperial ivory engraver until at least 1712, producing two further major works : the equestrian statuette of Emperor Charles VI (now in the Schatzkammer (Vienna) and the portrait relief of the Bishop of Breslau Franz Ludwig von Pfalz-Neuburg (now at the Bavarian National Museum, Munich).

After being appointed imperial engineer for buildings and gardens (Kaiserlicher Bau-und-Hof-Ingenieur) he applied himself to the design of interior decorations for monasteries and churches, including the following:

- Vorau Abbey: the high altar (created by the sculptors J. F. Caspar and G. Niedermayr) and the entire interior (1699–1704); pulpit (1706) (this work is considered as the first High Baroque decoration in Austria with a stylistic and iconographic unity);
- Klosterneuburg Priory: a monstrance (1710); the triumphal arches, choir decorations (together with Donato Felice d'Allio) and an altar (1714); the Baroque refurbishment of the main hall (1725–27)
- Herzogenburg Priory: a monstrance (1722). Steinl also made the designs for the reconstruction of the church here c. 1700;
- Zwettl Abbey: choir decorations.

Among Steinl's later creations as architect were the tower of the Augustine church at Dürnstein (1721–1725) and the tower of the monastery church of Zwettl Abbey (1722–1728). These were constructed in somewhat altered form by Josef Muggenast, after Steinl's death in 1727.

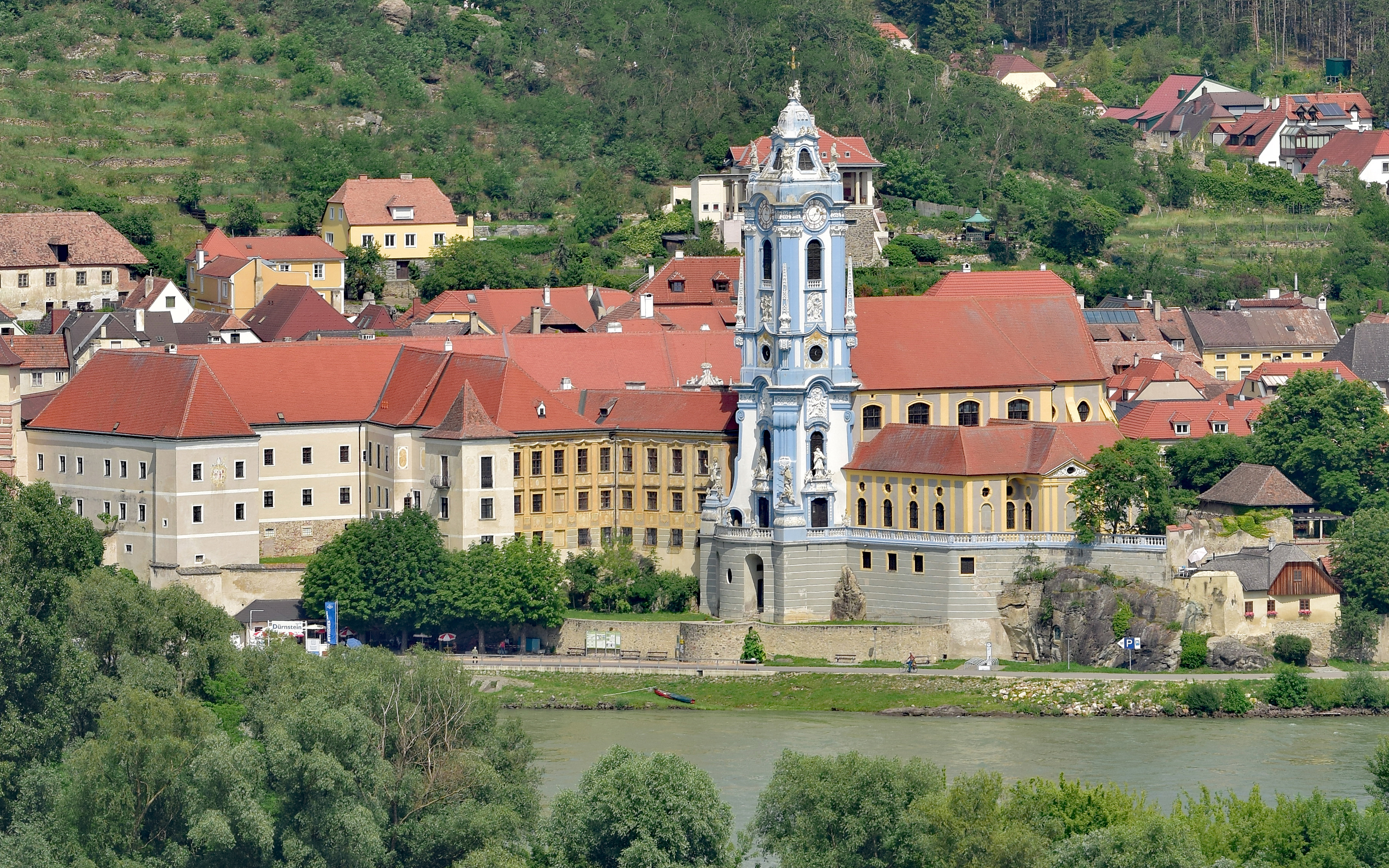
Tower at Dürnstein

Steinl also created many altars, pulpits and portals in churches in Vienna and other places in Austria, such as Lambach and Gutenstein.
