= Anton Erhard Martinelli =

Austrian architect

- Born: 1684; Vienna, Austria
- Died: 15 September 1747 (aged 62–63); Vienna, Austria
- Occupation: Architect

Anton Erhard Martinelli (1684 – 15 September 1747) was an Austrian architect and master-builder of Italian descent.

Martinelli was born in Vienna. He was the son of architect Franz Martinelli.

Anton Erhard Martinelli supervised the construction of several important buildings in Vienna, such as the Karlskirche and the Palais Schwarzenberg or the remodelling of the Deutschordenskirche. He designed the plans of the Palais Thinnfeld in Graz and of Invalidenhaus (Invalidus-palota) in Budapest, now the city hall.

In cooperation with his brother Johann Baptist Martinelli, he also designed the plans of several baroque churches in the Habsburg empire, among which Holy Trinity Cathedral in Blaj and carried out work for the estates of the Esterházy family (such as the country house in Fertőd) He also worked on the Lanschütz mansion (in Bernolákovo) and the Veľký Biel mansion in Western Slovakia, and the restoration of the Dvorac Zrinskih (Zrinski Castle) of the Croatian counts in Čakovec, Croatia.

He died in Vienna in 1747.

== Works ==
- Karlskirche in Vienna
- Palais Schwarzenberg in Vienna
- Deutschordenkirche in Vienna.
- Invalidenhaus (Invalidus-palota) in Budapest
- Holy Trinity Cathedral in Blaj
- Castle of Vranov nad Dyjí
- Castle of Hluboká nad Vltavou
- Esterházy country house in Fertőd
- Lanschütz mansion (in Bernolákovo)
- Veľký Biel mansion
- Dvorac Zrinskih (Zrinski Castle) in Čakovec
- Palais Thinnfeld in Graz
- Neuwartenburg Castle in Timelkam
- St.Jacob Church in Kostelec na Hane
- Town hall in České Budějovice
