= Johann Baptist Martinelli =

- Born: 8 February 1701; Vienna, Austria
- Died: 21 June 1754 (aged 53); Vienna, Austria
- Occupation: Architect

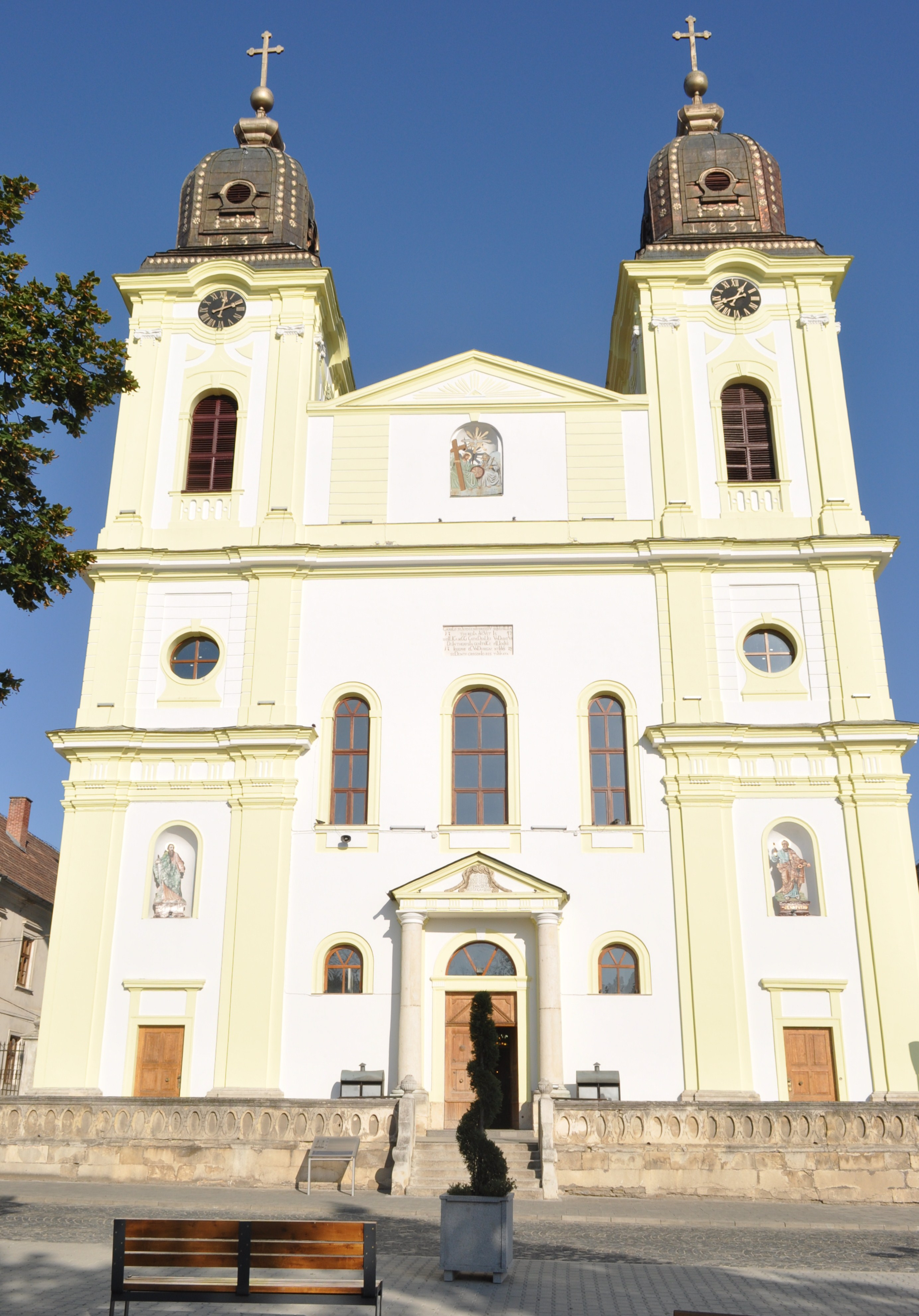
Metropolitan Cathedral "Holy Trinity" in Blaj

Johann Baptist Martinelli or Giovanni Battista Martinelli (8 February 1701 – 21 June 1754) was an Austrian architect and baumeister of Italian descent.

He was born in Vienna, the son of architect Franz Martinelli. In cooperation with his brother Anton Erhard Martinelli, he designed the plans of several baroque churches in the Habsburg empire, including the church in Grossweikersdorf, the Holy Trinity Cathedral in Blaj and the church in Dunaalmás. He also designed several mansions among which the one in Dolná Krupá. He died in his native city of Vienna, aged 53.

== See also ==
- Bratislava Castle
