= Franz Martinelli =

Austrian architect

- Born: 1651; Tremezzo, Italy
- Died: 28 October 1708; Vienna, Austria
- Occupation: Architect

Franz Martinelli (or Italian: Francesco Martinelli; 1651 – 28 October 1708) was an Austrian architect.

In 1684 he was in charge of the restoration work of the Servitenkirche in Vienna. In 1687 he also participated in the construction of the Heiligenkreuz Abbey. From 1703 until his death, Martinelli participated in the construction of the Peterskirche in Vienna.

His most important work is the Palais Esterházy on Wallnerstraße in Vienna, which he first renovated in 1685 and thereafter completely rebuilt, finishing the work in 1695. He also designed the Franciscan in Frauenkirchen, Hungary. Both the ground-plan and the main façade of his building on seventeenth-century Jesuit churches.

He is the father of architects Anton Erhard Martinelli and Johann Baptist Martinelli.

Franz Martinelli died in Vienna on 28 October 1708.
