= Kupelwieser =

Kupelwieser is a surname. Notable people with the surname include:

- Joseph Kupelwieser (1791–1866), Austrian playwright, librettist, dramaturge, and theatre director
- Leopold Kupelwieser (1796–1862), Austrian painter, brother of Joseph
