= Paolo Martinelli =

Paolo Martinelli may refer to:

- Paolo Martinelli (engineer) (born 1952), Italian automotive engineer
- Paolo Martinelli (bishop) (born 1958), Italian Catholic bishop
- Paolo Martinelli (rower), Italian lightweight rower
