= 1291 in France =

- Decades: 1270s; 1280s; 1290s; 1300s; 1310s
- See also: History of France; Timeline of French history; List of years in France

Events from the year 1291 in France.

== Incumbents ==
- Monarch - Philip IV

== Events ==
- 19 February - Philip IV of France, Alfonso III of Aragón, Charles II of Naples and Pope Nicholas IV signed the Treaty of Tarascon to formalize the end of Aragonese Crusade.

== Births ==
- 31 October - Philippe de Vitry, French composer and poet (died 1361)

=== Full dates unknown ===
- Marie of Artois, Countess Consort of Namur (died 1365)
- Luis de la Cerda, French noble and expatriate prince of Castile (died 1348)

== Deaths ==
- 18 May - Matthew of Clermont, French knight and Marshal (birth date unknown)

=== Full date unknown ===
- Guillaume de Beaujeu, Grand Master of Knights Templar (born 1230)
- Agnes d'Harcourt, abbess of the Abbey of Longchamp (birth date unknown)

== See also ==
Media related to 1291 in France at Wikimedia Commons
