= Flag and coat of arms of Île-de-France =

French regional flag of Île-de-France

Flag of Île-de-France
- Use: Local government flag
- Adopted: October 10, 2005
- Design: A white field with the Île-de-France logo

Coat of arms of Île-de-France
- Adopted: 14th century (de facto)
- Use: Coat of arms of the Kingdom of France, also used at that time by Île-de-France

Île-de-France has no official flag and coat of arms other than using the logo of the Île-de-France government. The royal coat of arms of France, three gold Fleur-de-lis on a solid-blue background, used to serve as the coat of arms of the Province of Île-de-France before it was dissolved 1790 during the French Revolution.

== See also ==
- List of flags of Île-de-France
