= Agnes d'Harcourt =

- Died: 1291
- Occupations: Nun and writer
- Notable work: The Life of Isabelle of France
- Title: Abbess of Abbey of Longchamp

Agnes d'Harcourt (died 1291) was an author and the abbess of the Abbey of Longchamp.

d'Harcourt became a nun and joined the convent at Longchamp in 1260, serving alongside the abbey's founder, Isabelle of France. During her time at Longchamp d'Harcourt was appointed abbess, and she remained at the abbey as a nun until her death. While serving as abbess, d'Harcourt wrote Life of Isabella, the biography of her friend, colleague, and eventual saint, Isabelle. The book is considered one of the "most valuable works of the early French writer."

== Life and family ==
Agnes d'Harcourt was the daughter of Jean I, baron of Harcourt and vicomte of St. Sauveur, and his wife Alix of Beaumont. d’Harcourt’s family had strong connections to the French royal family: her father fought alongside Louis IX and Phillip III on crusades, and her brothers were all in royal service; her oldest brother, Jean II, was field marshal and admiral of France, and three other brothers served as advisers to Philip III and Philip IV.

d'Harcourt was among the first group of women to enter Longchamp after it was established in June 1260. She served as Longchamp’s abbess for two terms, the first from 1266 to 1270 and the second from September 1281 to August 1287. It is possible that her first term was longer in duration, with scholar Sean Field theorizing that d'Harcourt’s first post lasted from 1264 to 1275.

d'Harcourt’s date of death is disputable. A likely date falls in November 1291.

== Career ==
d'Harcourt was the first Longchamp abbess to be re-elected to the position after an interim period of other leadership, indicating that the sisters in residence felt confident in her abilities. Through her role as abbess, d'Harcourt was responsible for buying land, negotiating for rents, and securing royal confirmation of the abbey’s purchases; records also indicate her involvement in filing a legal claim regarding the enforcement of a will. Analysis of the surviving records reveals a female leader who was “more literate, more adept at dealing with written documents, and more forceful in legal matters than her contemporaries.”

== Writing ==
Two examples of d'Harcourt’s writing survive: Letter on Louis IX and Longchamp and The Life of Our Holy and Blessed Lady and Mother Madame Isabelle of France, known later as The Life of Isabelle of France (the production of which may make Agnes d'Harcourt “the first woman to have written an extant work of French prose”).

The Life of Isabelle of France was produced at the request of Isabelle’s brother Charles of Anjou, king of Sicily, probably between 1280 and 1285, ten to fifteen years after Isabelle’s death. Field theorizes that Charles’s request was spurred by a desire to see his sister canonized; the request was made during the same period in which Louis IX (Charles and Isabelle’s brother) was being considered for sainthood.

The Life of Isabelle of France is one of only three 13th-century biographies written by women about women; as such, it provides insight into how holy women viewed their own work and the work of their sisters, without the use of a male intermediate or scribe. Unlike many works produced about 13th century holy women by male clergymen, d'Harcourt’s biography does not stress Isabelle’s physical experiences of a union with Christ, nor does it imply that Isabelle experienced “mystical contact with the divine.” Instead, d'Harcourt highlighted Isabelle’s public work: “charity and care for the poor and unfortunate, her humility toward others, her renunciation of fine clothes [and] her role as founder of the abbey and author of its rule.” The biography produces an image of Isabelle as a legitimate leader who interacted and cooperated with powerful men, including the leaders of other religious houses, university professionals, the king, and the Pope.

In addition to being a biography and a work of prose, The Life of Isabelle of France also showcases d'Harcourt’s work as an early historian. As scholar Anne-Helene Allirot notes, d'Harcourt reported events that she either witnessed firsthand or for which she could obtain information directly from eyewitnesses; she was careful to cite her sources, and endeavored to record the observations of as many witnesses as possible. Her methods, according to Allirot, indicate “a strong awareness of the historical importance of written evidence.”

== Legacy ==
d'Harcourt is a featured figure on Judy Chicago's installation piece The Dinner Party, being represented as one of the 999 names on the Heritage Floor.
