= List of flags of Île-de-France =

This is a list of flags of Île-de-France, including symbolic national and sub-regional flags, standards and banners used exclusively in Île-de-France.

== Regional flags ==
Flag	Date	Use	Description
	14th century (de facto)	Traditional flag of Île-de-France	Three gold Fleur-de-lis on a solid-blue background. Same as the Kingdom of France. This symbol, three gold Fleur-de-lis on a solid-blue background, is a banner of the former royal coat of arms of France, the king historically being the direct lord of Île de France (as the core of his royal demesne).
	10 October 2005	Regional council flag of Île-de-France	White flag with the regional council logo.

== Departmental flags ==
Flag	Date	Use	Description
		Flag of Essonne	
		Flag of Hauts de Seine	
		Flag of Paris (Registered by the French Society of Vexillology)	A blue and red vertical bicolor with the coat of arms
		Flag of Seine-et-Marne	
		Flag of Seine-Saint-Denis	Derived from a proposition of coat-of-arms. Never adopted but used culturally.
		Flag of Val-de-Marne	
		Flag of Yvelines	

== See also ==
- List of French flags

== Footnotes ==
- ^reg Registered at the French Society of Vexillology.
