= Saint Isabelle of France =

13th-century French Roman Catholic saint

St. Isabelle of France
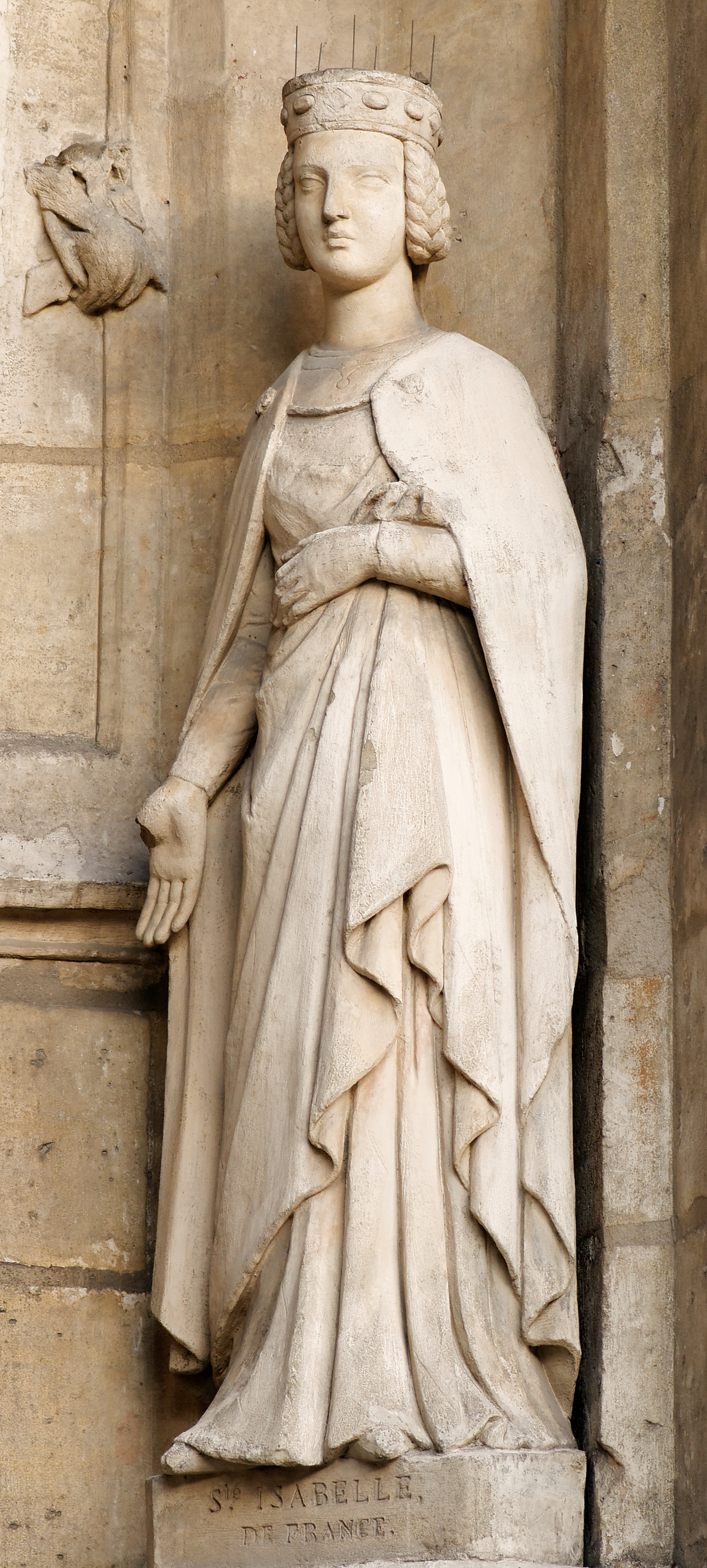
- St. Isabelle at the Church of Saint-Germain l'Auxerrois in Paris, a Neo-Gothic replica of the original statue
- Born: March 1225; Paris, France
- Died: 23 February 1270 (aged 44); Longchamp, Pays de France, Kingdom of France
- Burial: Longchamp Abbey, Pays de France, Kingdom of France
- House: Capet
- Father: Louis VIII of France
- Mother: Blanche of Castile

St. Isabelle of France

Virgin
- Venerated in: Catholic Church (Poor Clares in France)
- Beatified: 1521 by Pope Leo X
- Canonized: 1696 by Pope Innocent XII
- Feast: 26 February
- Patronage: Patroness of the Sick

Isabelle of France (March 1225 – 23 February 1270) was a French princess and daughter of Louis VIII of France and Blanche of Castile. She was a younger sister of King Louis IX of France (Saint Louis) and of Alfonso, Count of Poitiers, and an older sister of King Charles I of Sicily. In 1256, she founded the nunnery of Longchamp in part of the Forest of Rouvray (now called the Bois de Boulogne), west of Paris. Isabelle consecrated her virginity and her entire life to God alone. She is honored as a saint by the Franciscan Order. Her feast day is 26 February.

== Early life ==
Born in March 1225, (Note: Sean L. Field states in modern terms 1225 is the correct year, though 1223–1224 is also possible.) Isabelle was daughter of Louis VIII of France and Blanche of Castile. Her father died when she was two years old, and it was her mother, Blanche, who oversaw her education. Isabelle could read both Latin and the vernacular, and enjoyed tales of chivalry as well as devotional texts. While pursuing the traditional feminine interests such as embroidery, she took special pleasure in working on priestly vestments. As a child, she requested spiritual direction and became even more devoted to the Lord under the guidance of the Franciscans.

By virtue of the Treaty of Vendôme in March 1227, Isabelle was betrothed to Hugh, eldest son and heir of Hugh X of Lusignan, with the marriage contract being signed on June 1230; however, she refused to celebrate the formal wedding due to her fixed determination to remain a virgin, although she never became a nun. Later, she refused the hand of Conrad IV of Germany, son of Frederick II, Holy Roman Emperor, although pressed to accept by everyone, even by Innocent IV.

By the papal bull of 26 May 1254, Pope Innocent IV allowed her to retain some Franciscan friars as her special confessors. She was even more devoted to the Franciscan Order than was her royal brother.

== Longchamp Abbey ==
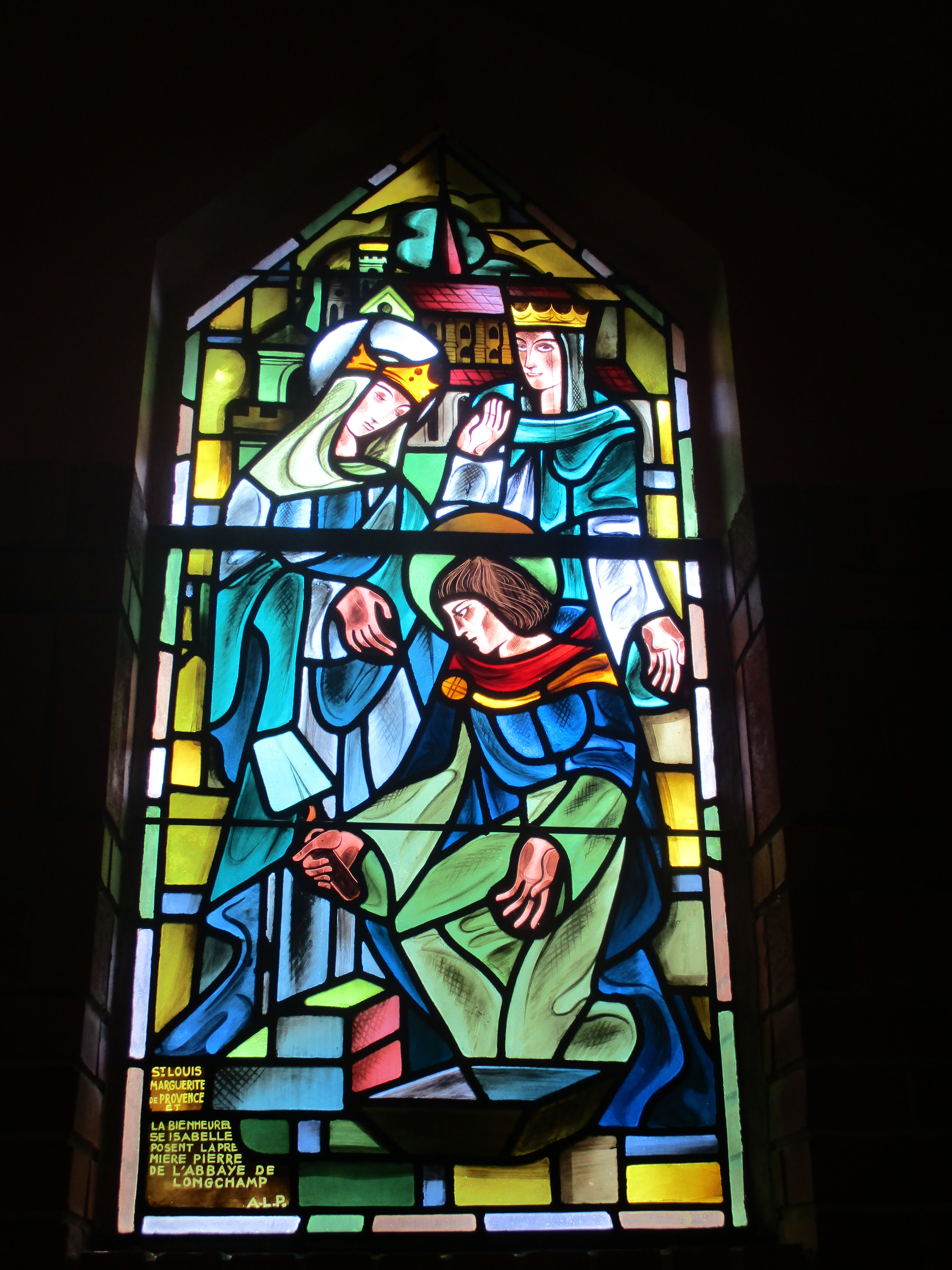
Saint Louis laying the first stone of the Longchamp Abbey with Blessed Isabella of France and Queen Marguerite of Provence. Stained glass window of the Saint-Louis chapel of the Franciscans in Paris.

As Isabelle wished to, she found a community of Sorores minores (Sisters minor), her brother King Louis began in 1255 to acquire the necessary land in the Forest of Rouvray, not far from the Seine, west of Paris. On 10 June 1256, the first stone of the monastic church was laid. Pope Alexander IV gave his sanction on 2 February 1259 to the new Rule, which was composed especially for this monastery by Isabelle along with a team of Franciscan university masters including Bonaventure. The community was allowed to hold property. The monastery was named the Convent of the Humility of the Blessed Virgin. In the Rule the nuns were called the Sisters of the Humble Order of Servants of the Most Blessed Virgin Mary. The nuns were subject to the Friars Minor. Some of the first nuns came from the Poor Clare monastery in Reims. A revised version of the Rule was approved by Pope Urban IV on 27 July 1263, which granted the preferred name of Sorores minores inclusae, or Enclosed Sisters minor, for the nuns of Longchamp.

After the death of her mother, Isabelle retired to Longchamps, although she never actually joined the religious community there. She suffered from illnesses during her life, which prevented her from following the rule of life for the nuns. As patroness, she lived there in a room separate from the nuns' cells. She refused to become abbess, which allowed her to retain her wealth and resources, so she could support her abbey and continue to give to the poor. She kept a discipline of silence for most of her day. Her brother, the King, visited often.

== Death ==
Isabelle died at Longchamp on 23 February 1270, and was buried in the abbey church.

=== Religious veneration ===
After nine days of burial her body was exhumed; according to her hagiographies, it showed no signs of decay, and many miracles were said to have been wrought at her grave. In 1521 Pope Leo X allowed the abbey to celebrate her feast day with a special Office. On 4 June 1637, a second exhumation took place. On 25 January 1688, the nuns obtained permission to celebrate her feast with an octave, and in 1696 the celebration of the feast on 31 August was permitted to the whole Franciscan Order by Pope Innocent XII.

Longchamp Abbey was suppressed in the French Revolution. In 1794 the empty building was offered for sale, but, as no one wished to purchase it, it was destroyed. In 1857 the remaining walls were pulled down, except for one tower, and the land was incorporated into the Bois de Boulogne.

Her relics were moved to the Basilica of Saint-Denis.

== Ancestry ==
Ancestors of Saint Isabelle of France

8. Louis VII of France
4. Philip II of France
9. Adèle of Champagne
2. Louis VIII of France
10. Baldwin V, Count of Hainaut
5. Isabelle of Hainaut
11. Margaret I, Countess of Flanders
1. Isabelle of France
12. Sancho III of Castile
6. Alfonso VIII of Castile
13. Blanca of Navarre
3. Blanche of Castile
14. Henry II of England
7. Leonor of England
15. Eleanor of Aquitaine

== See also ==
- Other Isabelles of France

== Notes ==
- Saint Isabelle of France, patron saint archive

== Sources ==
- Field, Sean L. (2006). Isabelle of France: Capetian Sanctity and Franciscan Identity in the Thirteenth Century. University of Notre Dame.
- Goldstone, Nancy (2009). Four Queens: The Provençal Sisters Who Ruled Europe. Phoenix Paperbacks, London. purple
- Nolan, Kathleen D. Capetian Women, 2003.
- Fuseralli, Massimo (2025). Isabella of France, a minor sister in the footsteps of St Francis (PDF). Rome.
