= Blanche of Castile =

Queen of France from 1223 to 1226

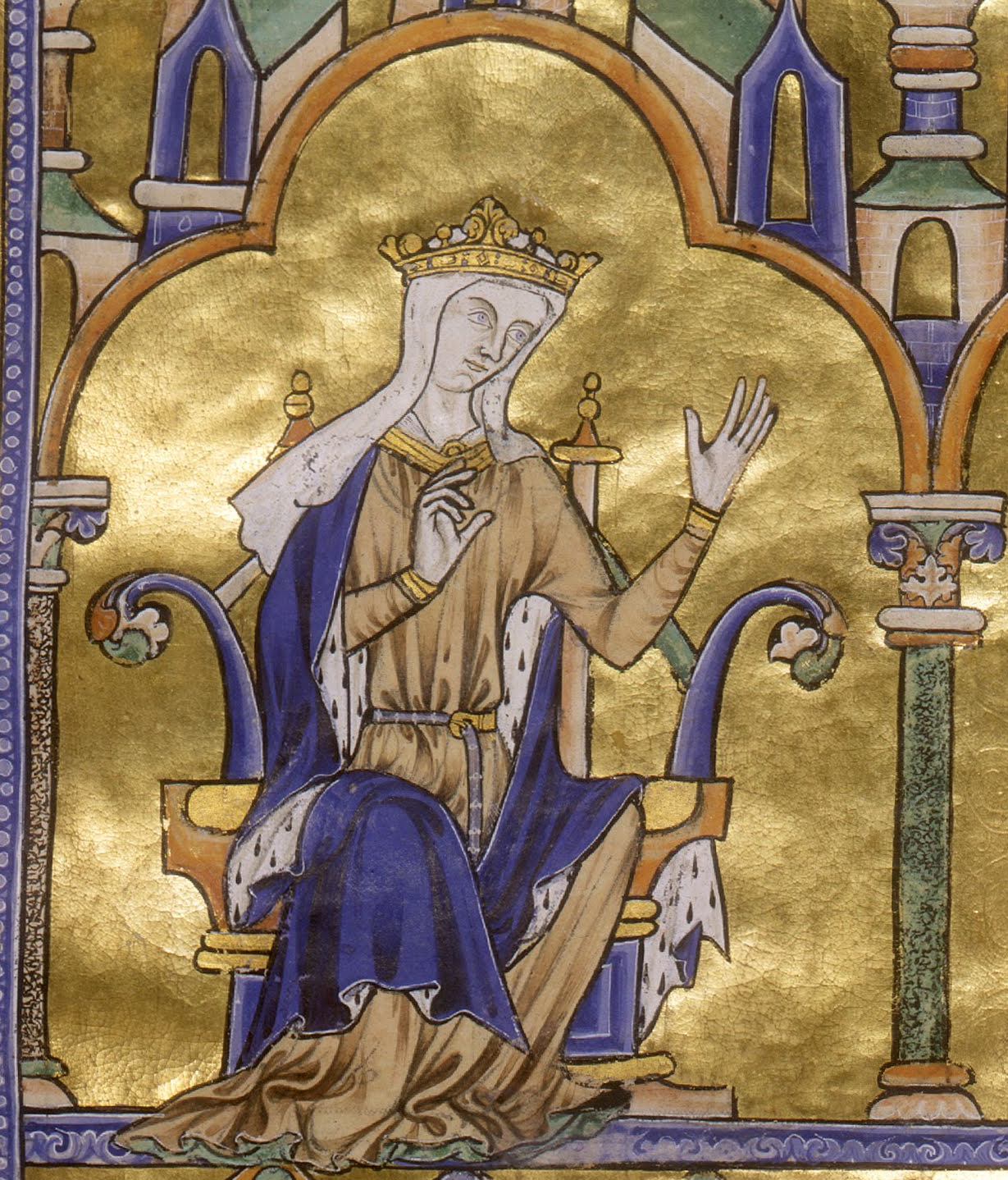
- Contemporary depiction from the Bible of St Louis, c. 1230

Queen consort of France
- Tenure: 14 July 1223 – 8 November 1226
- Coronation: 6 August 1223

Queen regent of France
- Regency: 8 November 1226 – 25 April 1234 (during the minority of the heir, her son Louis IX); August 1248 – 27 November 1252 (due to the Seventh Crusade led by her son)

Queen consort of England (disputed)
- Tenure: 2 June 1216 – 20 September 1217
- Born: 4 March 1188; Palencia, Castile
- Died: 27 November 1252 (aged 64); Paris, France
- Burial: Maubuisson Abbey
- Spouse: Louis VIII of France (m. 1200; died 1226)
- Issue Amongs others: Louis IX, King of France; Robert I, Count of Artois; Alphonse, Count of Poitiers; Saint Isabelle; Charles I, King of Sicily
- House: Ivrea
- Father: Alfonso VIII of Castile
- Mother: Eleanor of England

Blanche of Castile (Spanish: Blanca de Castilla; French: Blanche de Castille; 4 March 1188 – 27 November 1252) was Queen of France by marriage to Louis VIII. Blanche supported Louis' invasion to become King of England in her name, providing reinforcements. After her husband's death, she was appointed as sole regent according to Louis VIII's will. She acted as regent twice during the reign of her son, Louis IX: during his minority from 1226 until 1234, and during his absence from 1248 until 1252.

Blanche was the third daughter of Alfonso VIII, King of Castile, and Eleanor of England, and was chosen to marry the heir of Philip Augustus in the Treaty of Le Goulet. She was a great patron of cultural and religious works, played a significant role in governance during the regencies and in Louis IX's personal reign. She dealt with rebellions and raised armies, forcing the English to recognize French sovereignty over Poitou. She served as a diplomat signing the Treaty of Paris with Raymond VII count of Toulouse, ending the Albigensian Crusade. She made marriage alliances for her children and relatives. Blanche had a strong impact on her children, influencing their religious beliefs and having a controlling relationship over Louis IX.

St. Louis IX of France and his mentor near the feet of his mother Blanche of Castile, Miniature by Jean Le Noir, Hours of Jeanne de Navarre

During her second regency Blanche worked to ensure stability through the realm and raised funds for further support in the Crusade. Blanche quelled unrest such as the Paris student riots and Sheperd's Crusade. Blanche is considered one of the most successful and influential French queens, and one of the most capable medieval rulers as a whole. As written by historian Robert Fawtier, "To all intents and purposes she may be counted among the Kings of France."

== Early life ==
Blanche was born in Palencia, Spain, in 1188, the third daughter of Alfonso VIII, King of Castile, and Eleanor of England, sister of King Richard I of England and King John of England. In her youth, she visited the Abbey of Santa María la Real de Las Huelgas, founded by her parents, several times. In consequence of the Treaty of Le Goulet between Philip Augustus and John of England, Blanche's sister, Urraca, was betrothed to Philip's son, Louis. After meeting the two sisters, their grandmother Eleanor of Aquitaine (who had been a queen consort of France herself) judged that Blanche's personality was more fit to fulfil the role. In the spring of 1200, Eleanor crossed the Pyrenees with her and brought her to France instead.

== Appearance ==
Eleanor of Aquitaine judged that Urraca, Blanche's sister, was more beautiful than Blanche, although Catherine Hanley states we have no knowledge about what Blanche looked like.

== Marriage ==
Blanche was twelve years of age, and Louis was only half a year older, by the time the marriage treaty was finally signed. King John ceded the fiefs of Issoudun and Graçay as a dowry. The marriage was celebrated 23 May 1200, at Port-Mort on the right bank of the Seine, in John's domains, as those of Philip lay under an interdict. Blanche bore her first child in either 1205 or 1213, as sources vary.

The couple were noted of having a lavish, extravagant yet pious court, they were enthusiastic about hunting, Louis purchased spices and wines. Blanche and Louis had a compatible marriage and worked well together. The court entertained noble guests and enjoyed cultural entertainment, members of the household were well rewarded. From hagiographical accounts and from her son Charles, Blanche has been noted numerous times as a caring and devoted mother for the time. She was noted to have a strong influence in forming her children's pious characters. Blanche and Louis ensured their children were well educated, with strict and rigorous tutoring. Blanche is supposed to have told her son Louis that she would rather see him dead than commit adultery. Despite this, she greatly enjoyed the lavish foods and songs of the royal court.

Saint Louis being taught by his mother

During the English barons' rebellion of 1215–16 against King John, it was Blanche's English ancestry as granddaughter to Henry II that led to Louis being offered the throne of England as Louis I. Louis invaded England, landing on 21 May, and entered London, with support from nobles despite him being excommunicated for the invasion. However, with the death of John in October 1216, the barons changed their allegiance to John's son, the nine-year-old Henry.

Louis continued to claim the English crown in her right, only to find a united nation against him. Philip Augustus refused to help his son, and Blanche was his sole support. Blanche raised money from her father-in-law by threatening to put up her children as hostages. She established herself at Calais and organized two fleets, one of which was commanded by Eustace the Monk, and an army under Robert of Courtenay. With French forces defeated at Lincoln in May 1217 and then routed on their way back to their London stronghold, Louis desperately needed the reinforcements from France. On 24 August, the English fleet destroyed the French fleet carrying those reinforcements off Sandwich and Louis was forced to sue for peace.

== Queen of France ==
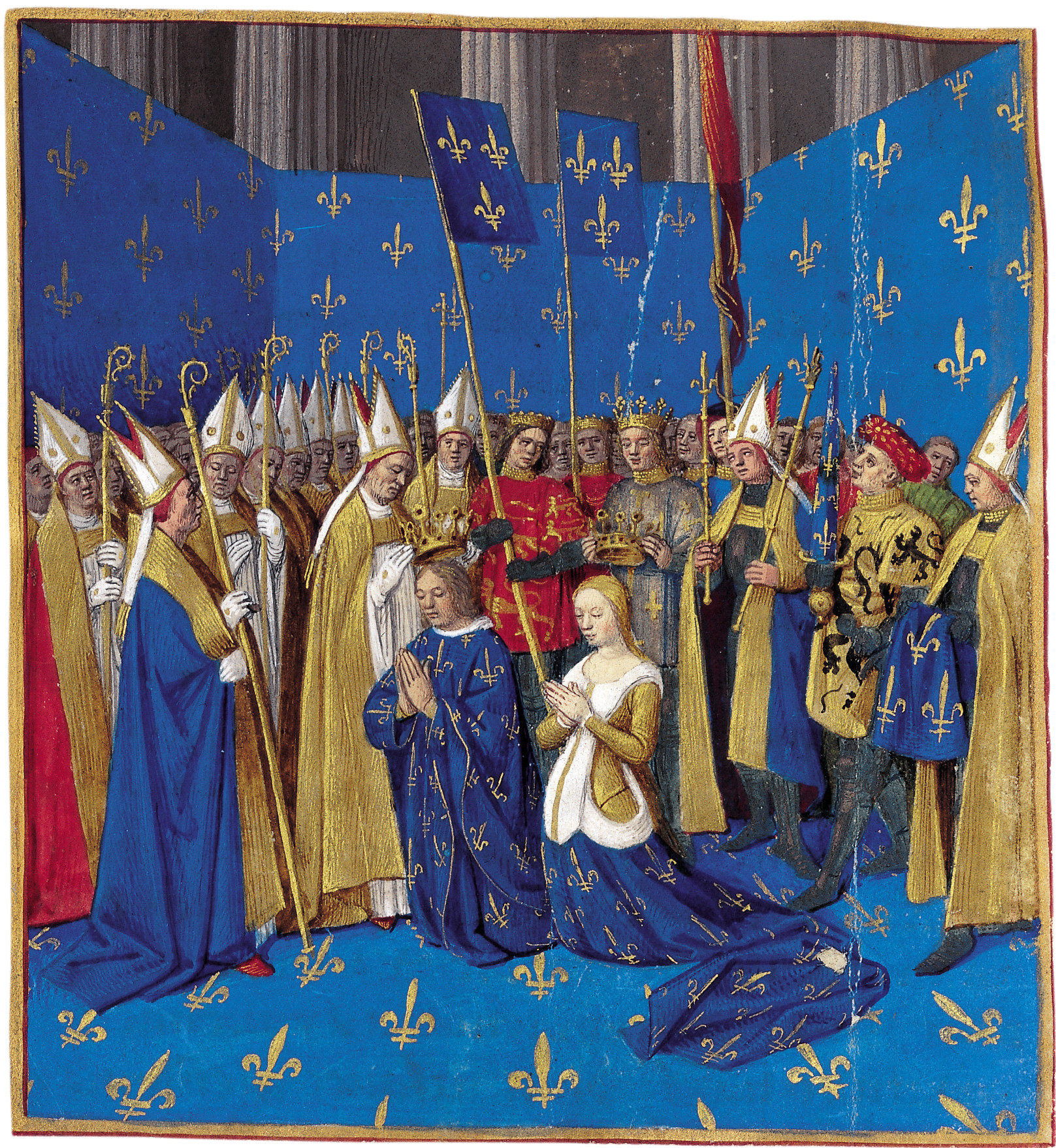
Louis VIII and Blanche of Castile's joint coronation from the Grandes Chroniques de France, c. 1450.

Philip died in July 1223, and Louis VIII and Blanche were crowned on 6 August. In 1223, a new revolt was started in Castile by the count of Molina. Molina and six of his allies appealed to Blanche and Louis to send their eleven year old son Louis to replace Blanche's nephew Ferdinand III. They did not send their heir to Castile, but the letters were filed in the royal archive. Louis VIII went on several military campaigns in his short reign, notably the Albigensian Crusade. In July 1224, Louis VIII besieged La Rochelle, and struggled to take the key city. Blanche staged a public performance of penitence in Paris, trying to gain God's help. She was accompanied by her niece Berengaria of Castile-León, Queen of Jerusalem and Queen Ingeborg. They walked in procession, praying for victory for Louis. Louis took La Rochelle the next day. Upon learning that Louis was returning from the Crusade, Blanche took her children to greet his return, only to learn he had died on the way back. Blanche was grief-stricken upon learning the news.

== Regency ==
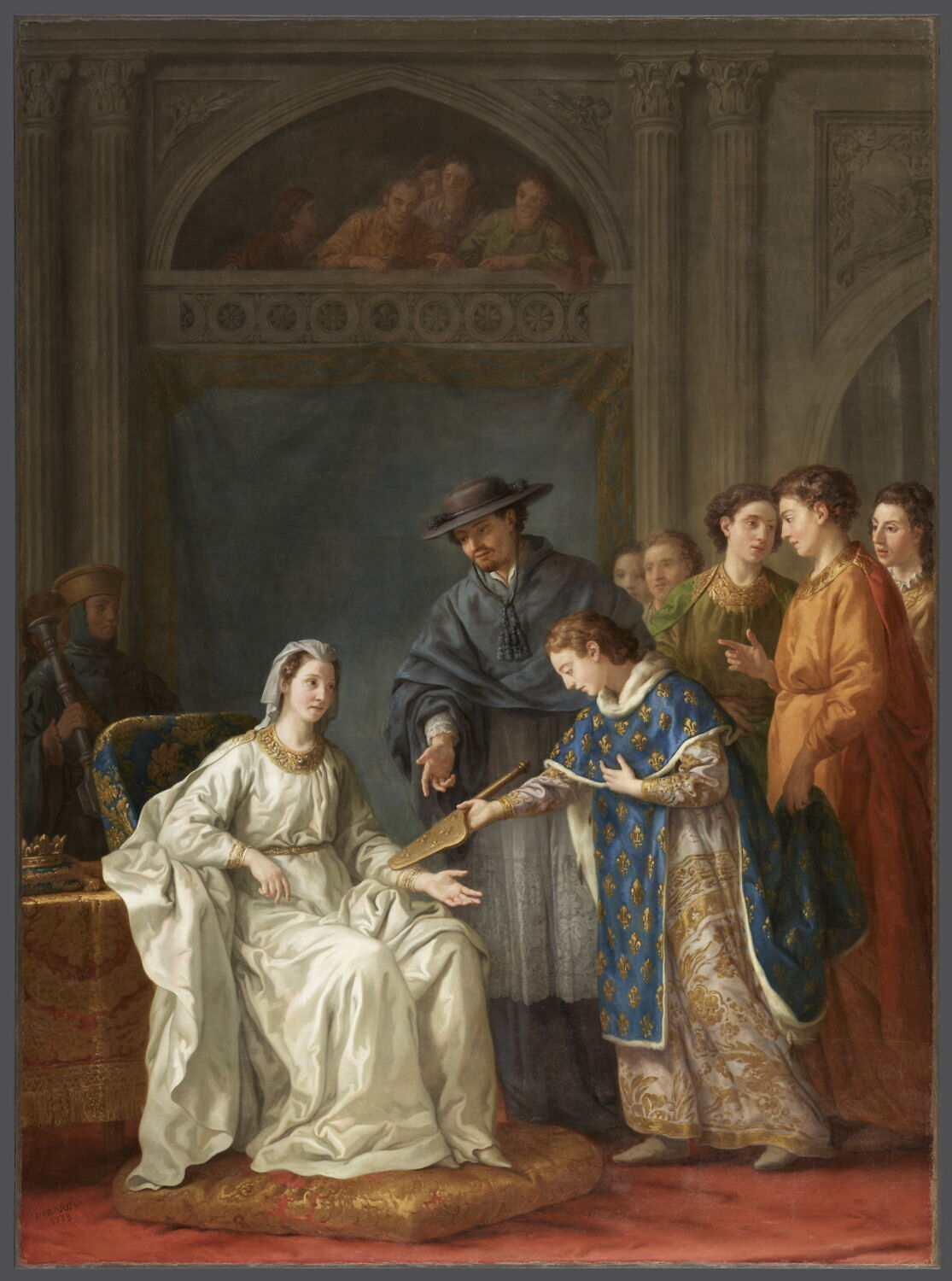
Saint Louis Handing Over the Regency to His Mother by Joseph-Marie Vien, 1773

Upon Louis' death in November 1226 from dysentery, he left Blanche, by then 38, regent and guardian of his children. Of her twelve or thirteen children, six had died, and Louis, the heir – afterwards the sainted Louis IX – was but twelve years old. She had him crowned within a month of his father's death in Reims and forced reluctant barons to swear allegiance to him. The situation was critical, since Louis VIII had died without having completely subdued his southern nobles. The king's minority made the Capetian domains even more vulnerable. To gain support, she released Ferdinand, Count of Flanders, who had been in captivity since the Battle of Bouvines. She ceded land and castles to Philip I, Count of Boulogne, son of King Philip II of France and his controversial wife, Agnes of Merania.

Several key barons, led by Peter Mauclerc, refused to recognize the coronation of the young king. Nobles such as the king's uncle Philip, and Capetian cousins had expected more powers in a joint regency. Shortly after the coronation, Blanche and Louis were traveling south of Paris and nearly captured. Blanche appealed to the people of Paris to protect their king. The citizens lined the roads and protected him as he returned.

Helped by Theobald IV of Champagne and the papal legate to France, Romano Bonaventura, she organized an army. Its sudden appearance brought the nobles momentarily to a halt. Twice more did Blanche have to muster an army to protect Capetian interests against rebellious nobles and Henry III of England. Blanche organized a surprise attack in the winter. In January 1229, she led her forces to attack Mauclerc and force him to recognize the king. She accompanied the army herself and helped collect wood to keep the soldiers warm. Not everyone was happy with her administration. Her enemies called her "Dame Hersent" (the wolf in the Roman de Renart).

A depiction of Blanche dressed as Minerva

In 1229, she was responsible for the Treaty of Paris, in which Raymond VII, Count of Toulouse, submitted to Louis. By the terms of the agreement, his daughter and heir, Joan, married Blanche's son, Alphonse, and the county could pass only to his heirs. He gave up all the lands conquered by Simon de Montfort to the crown of France. It also meant the end of the Albigensian Crusade.

To prevent Henry III of England from gaining more French lands through marriage, Blanche denied him the first two brides he sought. In 1226, he sought to marry Yolande of Brittany, Mauclerc's daughter. Blanche instead forced her father to give Yolande to Blanche's son John. When Henry became engaged to Joan, Countess of Ponthieu, Blanche lobbied the Pope to deny the marriage based on consanguinity, denying the dispensation Henry sought.

In 1230, Henry III came to invade France. At the cost of some of the crown's influence in Poitou, Blanche managed to keep the English Queen mother Isabella, Countess of Angoulême, and her second husband, Hugh X of Lusignan, from supporting the English side. However, Mauclerc did support the English and Brittany rebelled against the crown in 1230. Originally, the English landed in Brittany with 275 knights, men at arms, and barons to meet his ally Peter I, Duke of Brittany. The campaign began well for Henry III, who probably recruited foot soldiers on the continent as he brought 7,800 marks with him. On the other hand, Blanche's troops were insubordinate to her and refused to serve beyond the 40 day feudal contract; most disbanded after 40 days. Philip I, Count of Boulogne, left the royal forces and proceeded to raid Champagne. Blanche had to chase Philip to try to stop him from raiding the important county, leaving Henry III to proceed without serious resistance.

Meanwhile, the Norman nobles were also in open rebellion against Blanche. However, instead of marching to help the Norman rebels, he followed the advice of his vassal, advisor, and former regent Hubert de Burgh, 1st Earl of Kent, and marched into Poitou. In any case, it appears that Henry's excursion to Aquitaine was not necessary despite the calls for help by Geoffrey Beauchamp, who probably panicked due to a slight rise in unrest in Aquitaine. Henry besieged Mirabeau and proceeded to Bordeaux, apparently "securing" the south while also losing massive amounts of money and being forced to take loans. What made it worse was that Aquitaine was not in any serious danger of being taken by the French because what remained of the French royal army was trying to quash a rebellion in Champagne, nowhere near Aquitaine.

Seal of Blanche of Castile.

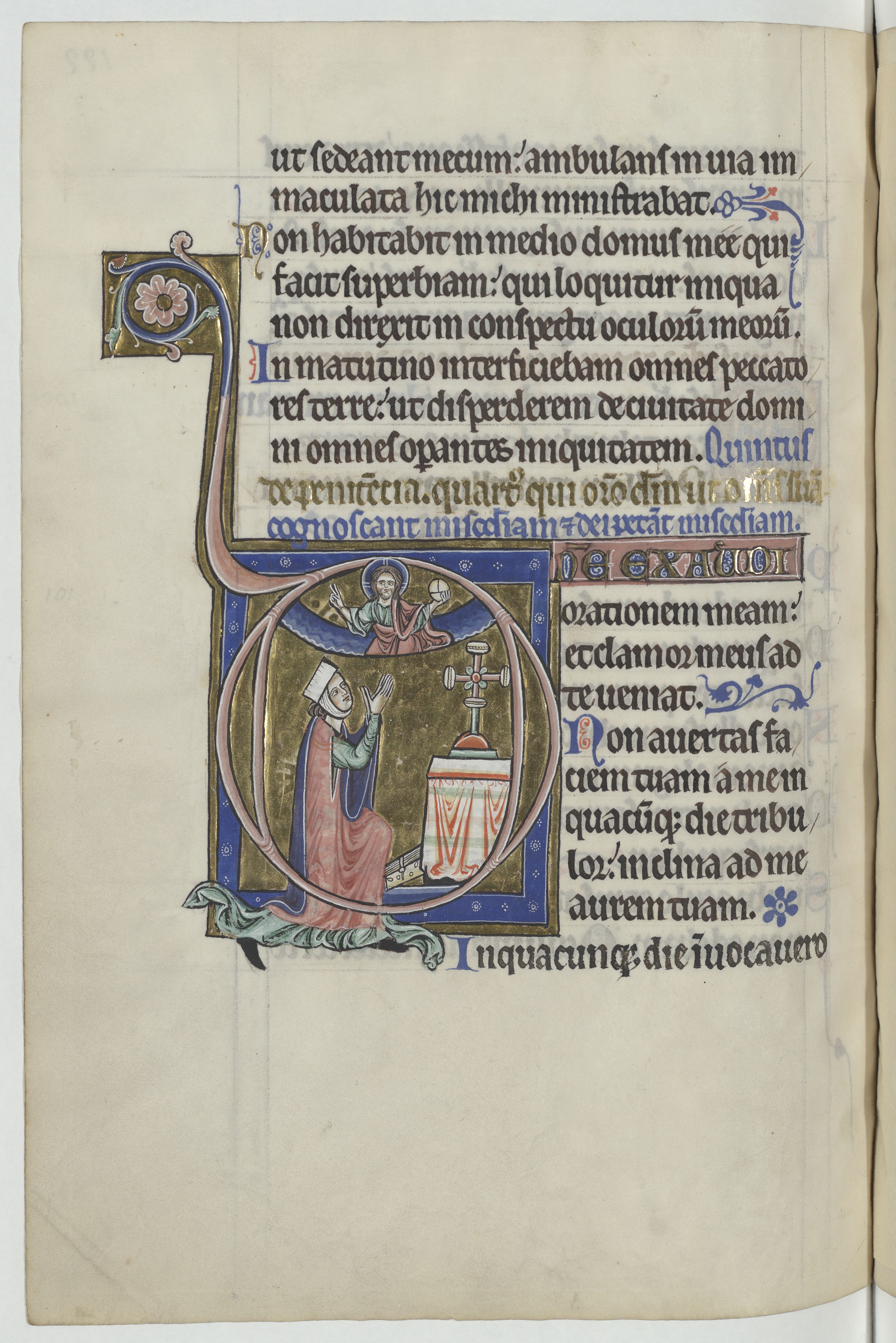
Psalter of Blanche of Castile, depicting her in prayer.

Henry's military operation was still not a complete loss. He was able to get money, military engines, and bolts for crossbows along with the militia of La Réole. Henry marched north into Poitou but the gifts which Blanche had sent to Hugh X of Lusignan, Count of La Marche, and Raymond I, Viscount of Thouars, kept them loyal to the French. Although the local lords could not see Henry off, he was either unable or unwilling to commit to a large offensive investment and decided to return to Brittany, where he spent the remainder of his money on feasts. He proceeded to England having accomplished little. He lost money and prestige even if he had not taken significant casualties. Thus the rebellion died out, which helped establish Blanche and Louis as more stable rulers. Henry's failure to make any significant impact with his invasions ultimately discouraged Mauclerc's rebellion, and, by 1234, he was firm in his support of Louis.

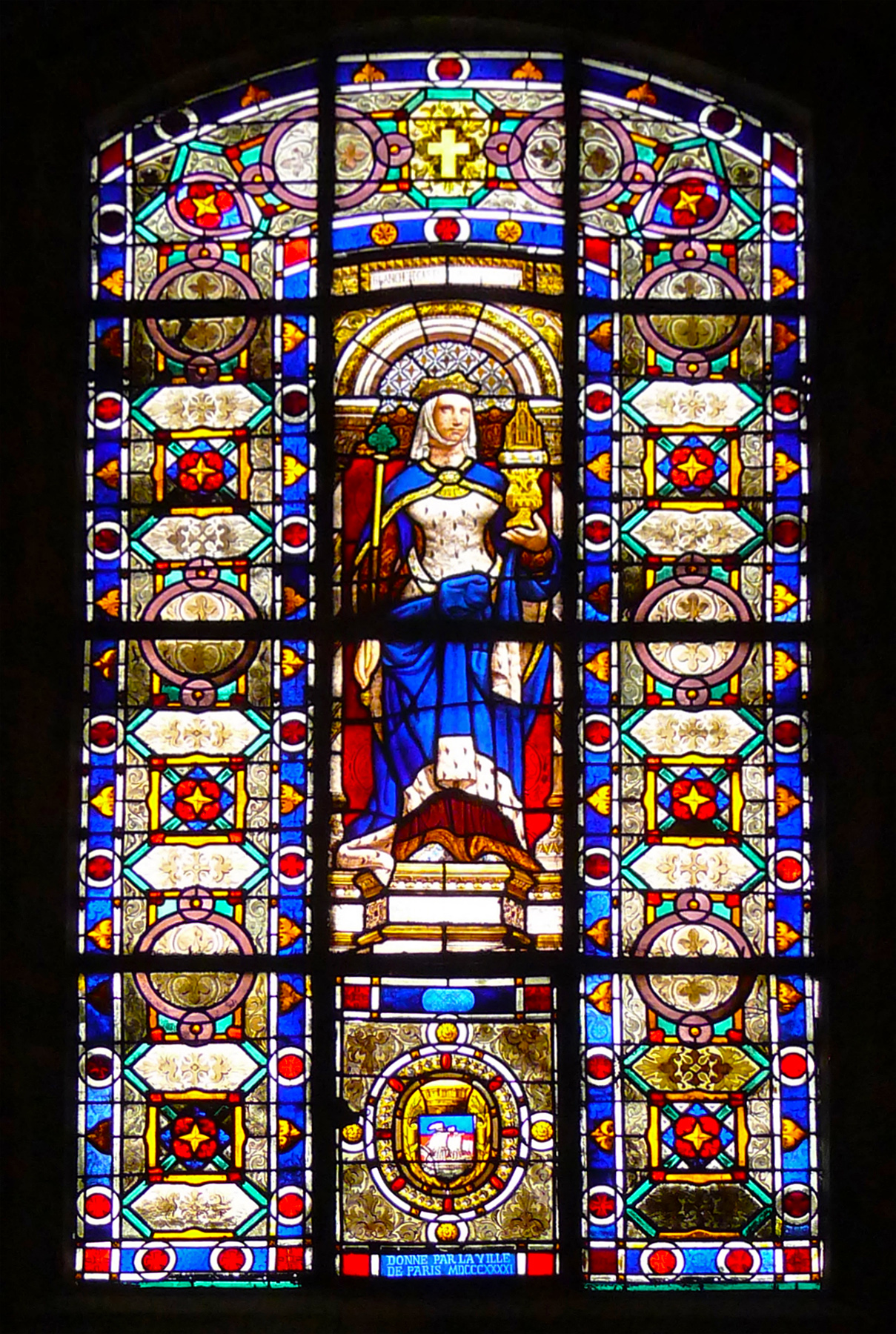
Stained glass window depicting Blanche of Castile in Paris.

By 1200, Paris became a center of philosophy and religion, especially at the University of Paris. During Blanche's regency, she had to deal with student riots. At Cardinal in 1229 a significant riot occurred, where a group of students got into a fight over wine prices at a tavern. The next day the students returned and attacked the tavern, destroying the wine flagons. Blanche was unsympathetic to the students appeals, and decided they should be punished. The scholars criticized her and accused her of being temperamental and caring little about learning. The students decided to leave the city, though most would return by 1231.

Through the regency Blanche bravely dealt with barons, Paris masters and the clergy. She raised armies, made judicial decisions, and made diplomatic negotiations. St. Louis owed his realm to his mother and remained under her influence for the duration of her life.

== Queen mother ==
Louis began to take part in political affairs by declaring his maturity, but Blanche was very influential and powerful in politics and court affairs, and her son did not withhold anything from her. No one dared to criticize the Queen Mother. Papal letters were still written to Blanche and Louis even after his majority, and letters were consistently written to Blanche about the state of the realm. Letters were often written to her, knowing her influence on Louis. Pope Gregory IX wrote requests to help depose the Holy Roman Emperor and for aid the emperor of Constantinople, but those these were usually ignored. In 1233, Raymond of Toulouse was starting to chafe under the terms of the treaty of Paris, thus Blanche sent one of her knights, Giles of Flagy, to convince him to cooperate. Blanche heard through troubadours of the beauty, grace, and religious devotion of the daughters of Ramon Berenguer IV, Count of Provence, and assigned Giles a second mission to visit Provence. Giles found a much better reception in Provence than in Toulouse. Upon his return to Paris, Blanche decided that a Provençal marriage would suit her son and help keep Toulouse in check. In 1234, Louis married Margaret of Provence, who was the eldest of the four daughters of Ramon, Count of Provence, and Beatrice of Savoy.

Depiction of Blanche separating Margaret from Louis.

She did not have a good relationship with her daughter-in-law, perhaps due to the controlling relationship Blanche had with her son, and she wanted to maintain control of her son and the court. To maintain better control over the new queen, Blanche dismissed the family and servants who had come to her wedding before the couple reached Paris. Prior to the arrival of the new queen, Blanche was considered the beauty of the court, and had poems written about her beauty by the count of Champagne. In 1230, it was even rumoured that she was pregnant by Romano Bonaventura. According to a historical anecdote, Blanche disproved the rumor by jumping on a table in front of a full council and revealing herself in a chemise. The new queen drew the attention of the court and the king away from Blanche, so she sought to keep them apart as much as she could. Jean de Joinville tells of the time when Queen Margaret was giving birth and Blanche entered the room telling her son to leave saying "Come ye hence, ye do naught here". Queen Margaret then allegedly fainted out of distress. Joinville also remarks that when Queen Blanche was present in the royal household, she did not like Margaret and Louis to be together "except when he went to lie with her". Louis and Margaret tried to secretly spend time together, and separated before Blanche returned.

Blanche welcomed her nephew future Alfonso III of Portugal into the French court and found him a wife, Matilda II, Countess of Boulogne. She also found a wife for another nephew Ferdinand III, Joan of Dammartin. In 1239, Blanche insisted on a fair hearing for the Jews in France. She presided over a formal disputation in the king's court. Louis insisted on the burning of the Talmud and other Jewish books, but Blanche promised Rabbi Yechiel of Paris, who spoke for the Jews, that he and his goods were under her protection.

Blanche played a significant role in deciding marriages for her children for political benefit. In 1243, a marriage was decided for her only surviving daughter Isabelle, with Conrad, son and heir of Frederick II. Isabelle however refused, choosing to devote her life to Christianity. After Isabelle suffered from an illness, Blanche accepted her wish.

On December 1244, Louis felt gravely ill, which would last until the end of next January. Blanche immediately took charge despite becoming slowly more distant from governance over the last few years. When Louis recovered, he was determined to take the cross as thanks, despite Blanche’s protests.

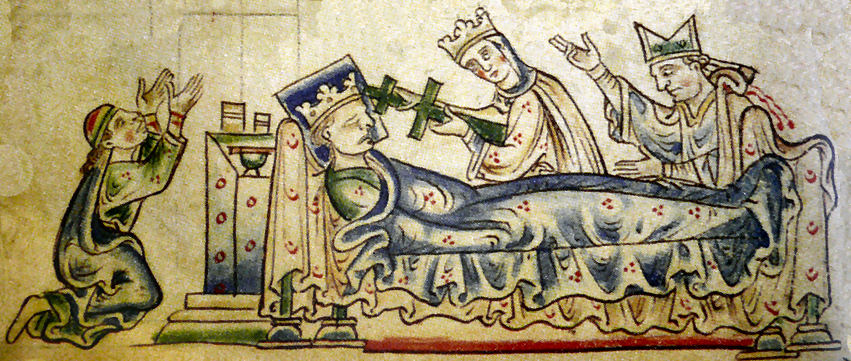
Detail showing Blanche of Castile at the bedside of St Louis. Louis took the cross after recovering from the illness.

== Second Regency, death and veneration ==
In 1248, Blanche again became regent during Louis IX's absence on the Crusade, a project which she had strongly opposed. Blanche once again became the de-facto ruler of the country, being involved in daily government business, settling disputes. She ensured that the scholars and citizens of Paris and barons kept the peace. Luckily the situation was calmer than the first regency due to France being under papal protection and many barons going on crusade as well. Blanche oversaw inheritance and succession disputes, which usually ended with a result beneficial to the crown.

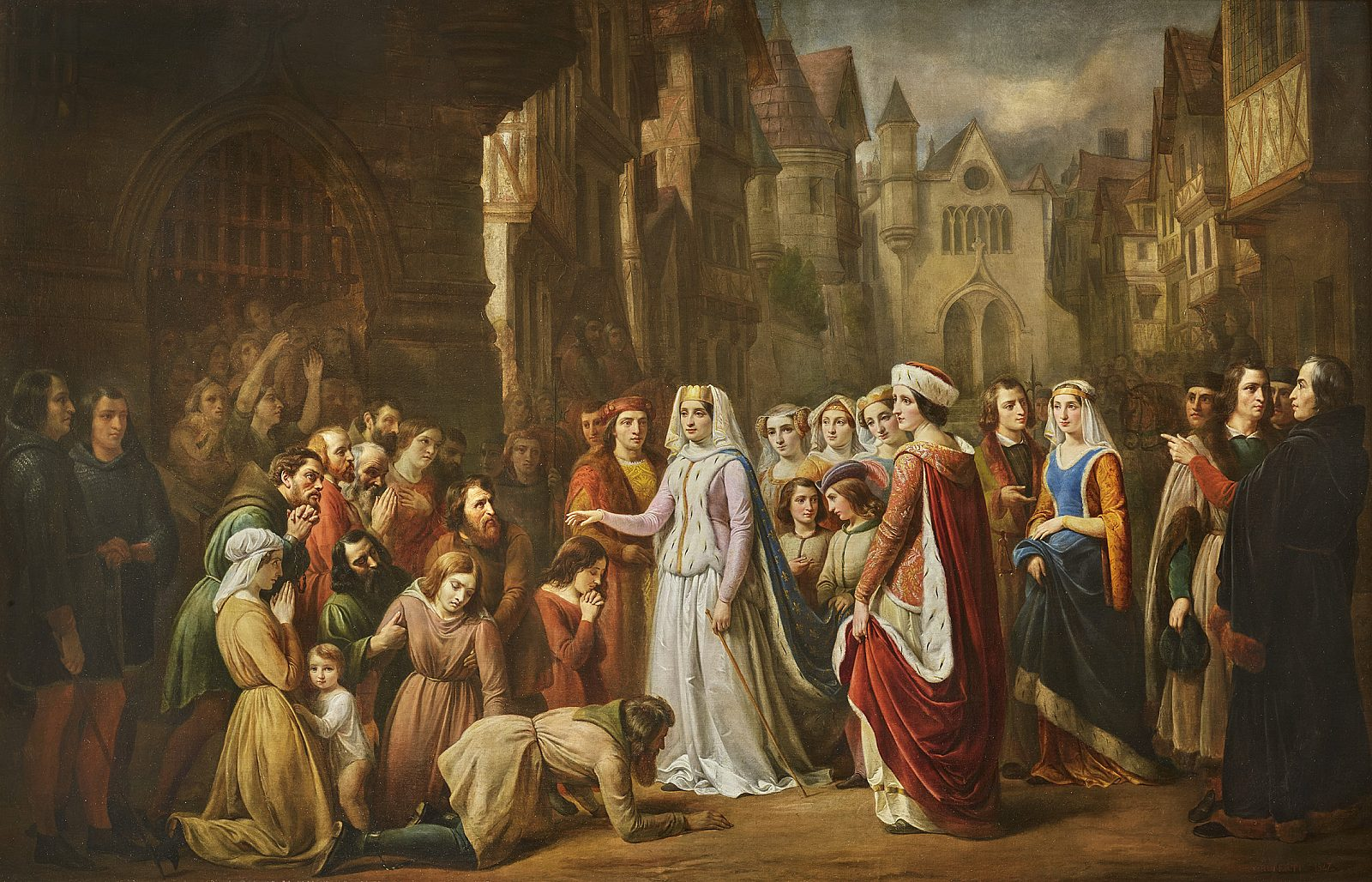
Blanche of Castile frees the prisoners by Albert Roberti, 1847

In Spring 1251, a group of peasants and townspeople formed together to launch their own Crusade. Led by the preacher the Master of Hungary, their aim was to aid the king on his crusade. When they entered Paris, Blanche welcomed them but soon riots and looting occurred. The queen waited for them to leave Paris before sending troops to disperse them. Another peasant conflict occurred in the summer of that year, with wealthy peasants who wished to negotiate their freedom. The chapter opposed, and wanted to make the manumission conditional with additional tax. The peasants appealed to the queen, who ruled in their favor. This along with her generosity to them built a view of her as a defender of the poor. In the disasters which followed, she maintained peace while draining the land of men and money to aid her son in the East. She fell ill at Melun in November 1252 and was taken to Paris, but lived only a few days. On her deathbed, she was laid on a straw bed, according to monastic tradition. She was buried at Maubuisson Abbey, which she had founded herself. Louis heard of her death in the following spring and reportedly did not speak to anyone for two days afterwards. The regency council that formed after her death was ineffective at exerting their power. Alphonse and Charles, the king’s brothers were primarily focused on their own territories, leaving a realm that needed repair after Louis’ return. Upon her death, Matthew Paris referred to her as the "Lady of the ladies of this world."

Stained glass of Louis IX and Blanche at Saint-Martin du Prieuré.

Though she was never officially canonized as a Saint by the Catholic Church, her cult has been recognized by popular piety in both local communities and churches devoted to St Louis or royal saints generally. This may be due to her being the mother of two canonized saints, St Louis IX, and St Isabelle. Due to this she is sometimes honoured, though unofficially, with the titles “Blessed” or even “Saint”, and some Catholic Churches even honour her with stained-glass windows.

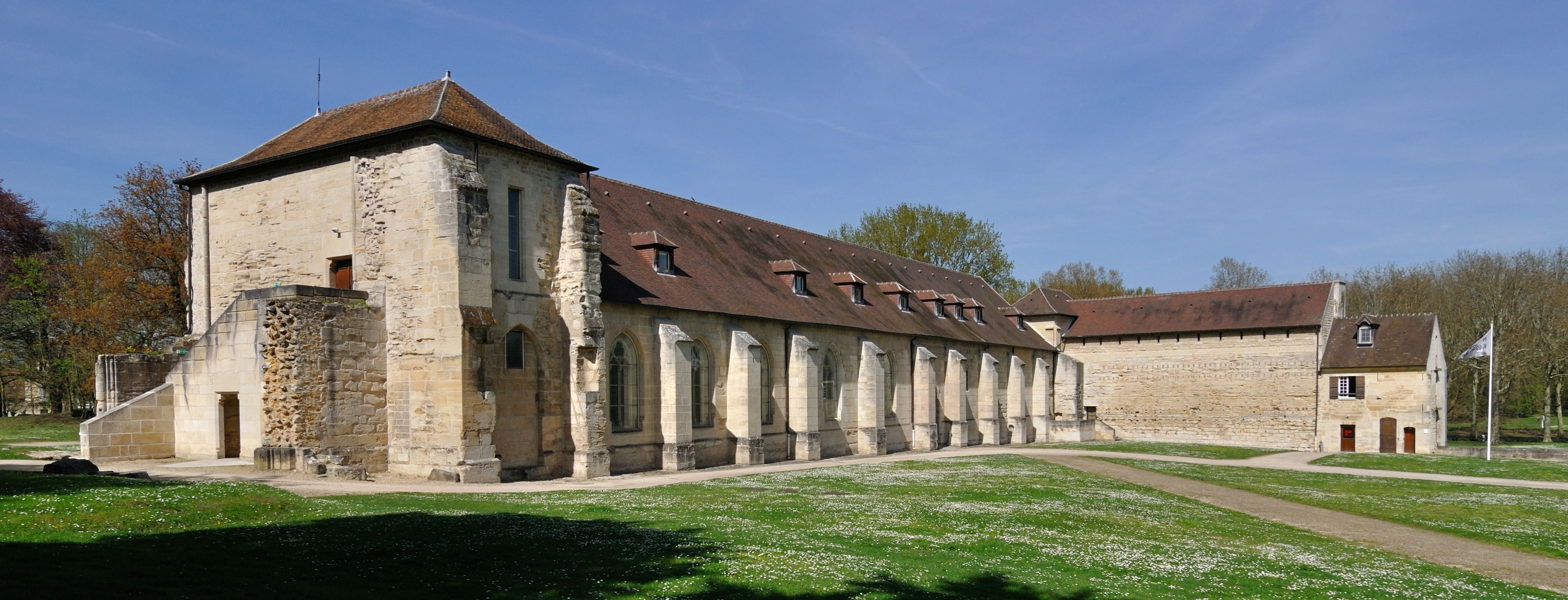
Maubuisson Abbey, founded by Blanche of Castile in 1236.

== Patronage and learning ==
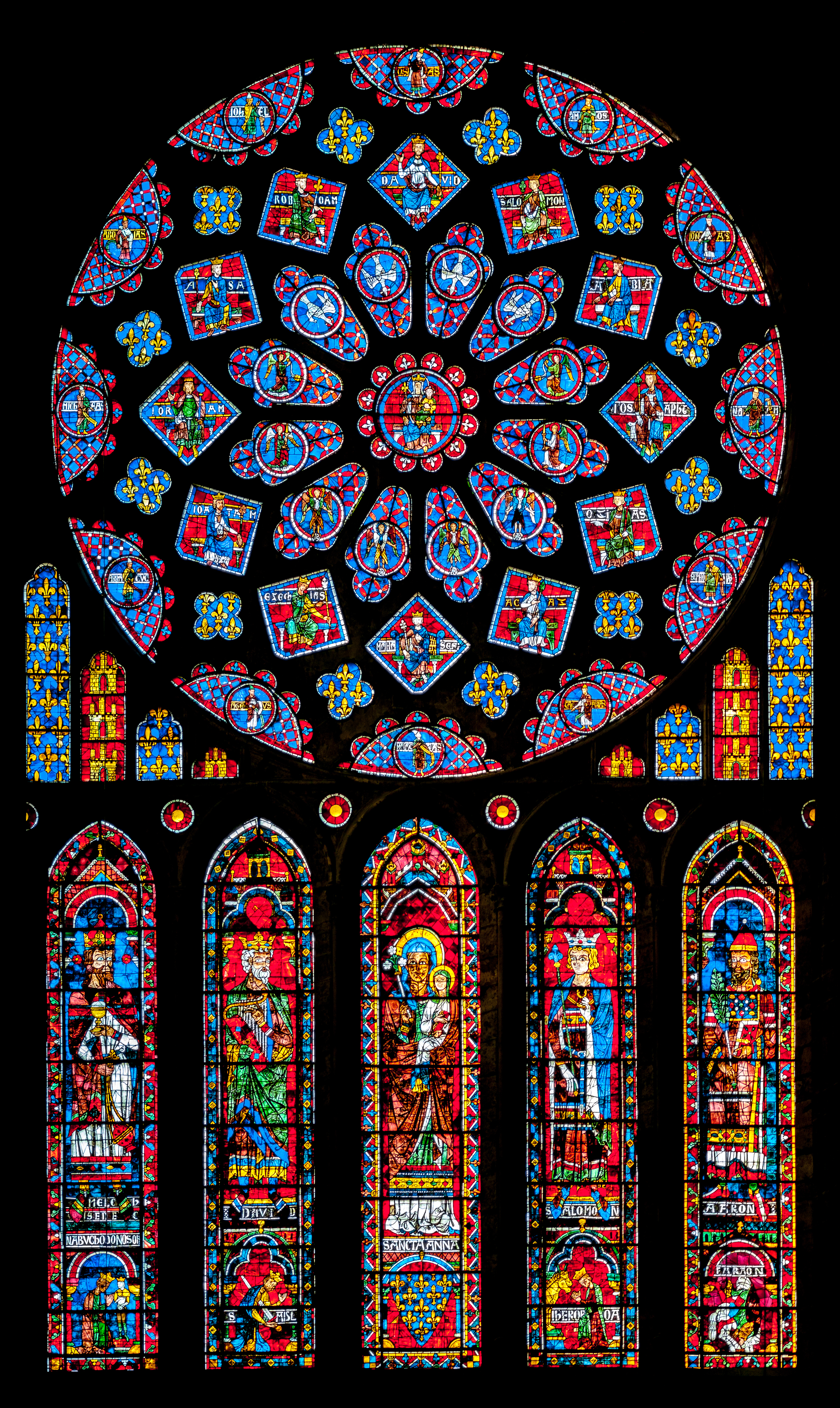
North transept window of Chatres Cathedral, with arms of France and Castile.

Blanche was generous with gifts, having many gifts given to friends and her Spanish relatives, which she was criticized for in baronial songs. She had a wide network of allies and was attentive to her lands and household, but her son Louis was concerned about her generous almsgiving.

Blanche was noted to have an impressive knowledge of Latin. A devotional work in Latin known as "Audi Domina" was written for her as queen, and her psalter contains latin text. Blanche was a patron of the arts and owned a variety of books, both in French and in Latin. Some of these were meant as teaching tools for her son. Le Miroir de l'Ame was dedicated to Blanche. It instructs queens to practise Christian virtues rigorously in daily life. She oversaw the education of her children, all of whom studied Latin. She also insisted on lessons in Christian morals for all of them. Both Louis and Isabelle, her only surviving daughter, were canonized.

Blanche commissioned many manuscripts and building projects including hospitals. She was a significant patron of religious abbeys, during her regency she founded a new abbey as directed by Louis VIII's will. He specified it to be an Augustinian abbey like the Abbey of La Victoire founded by Philip Augustus following the Battle of Bouvines. She however did not honor his request for a Victorine house, and entrusted the Cistercian Order for its foundation. The abbey became known as Royaumont Abbey. Louis IX later in his life noted how he and his younger brothers helped the monks in building the church.

The chanson Amours ou trop tard me suis pris, a prayer to the Virgin Mary, is often attributed to Blanche.

== Issue ==
Tree of Louis VIII and his family.

1. Blanche (1205 – 1206).
2. Philip (9 September 1209 – before July 1218), betrothed in July 1215 to Agnes of Donzy.
3. Alphonse (b. and d. Lorrez-le-Bocage, 26 January 1213), twin of John.
4. John (b. and d. Lorrez-le-Bocage, 26 January 1213), twin of Alphonse.
5. Louis IX (Poissy, 25 April 1214 – 25 August 1270, Tunis), King of France as successor to his father.
6. Robert (25 September 1216 – 9 February 1250, killed in battle, Manssurah, Egypt), Count of Artois.
7. John (21 July 1219 – 1232), Count of Anjou and Maine; betrothed in March 1227 to Yolande of Brittany.
8. Alphonse (Poissy, 11 November 1220 – 21 August 1271, Corneto), Count of Poitou and Auvergne, and by marriage, of Toulouse.
9. Philip Dagobert (20 February 1222 – 1234).
10. Isabelle (March 1224 – 23 February 1270).
11. Etienne (end 1225 – early 1227).
12. Charles (end 1226/early 1227 – 7 January 1285), Count of Anjou and Maine, by marriage Count of Provence and Folcalquier, and King of Sicily.

== Literature ==
Blanche of Castile is mentioned in François Villon's 15th century poem Ballade des Dames du Temps Jadis (Ballad of Ladies of Times Past), together with other famous women of history and mythology. Blanche's selection as bride for Louis and travel to France is noted in Elizabeth Chadwick's The Autumn Throne and E. L. Konigsburg's A Proud Taste for Scarlet and Miniver.

Blanche and Isabella of Angoulême are the main characters in Jean Plaidy's novel The Battle of the Queens, and she is briefly mentioned in Marcel Proust's Swann's Way, in a disaparaging way by Doctor Cottard and Brichot.

Blanche is a key character in the novel Four Sisters, All Queens, by Sherry Jones, which focuses on her daughters-in-law Margaret of Provence and Beatrice of Provence and their sisters Sancha of Provence and Eleanor of Provence. She is a supporting character in the novel The Crown Rose by Fiona Avery, based on the life of her daughter Saint Isabelle of France. Blanche is also a central antagonist in the fictional middle grade novel, The Inquisitor's Tale, written by Adam Gidwitz.

Blanche's betrothal is depicted in the Shakespearean history play King John.

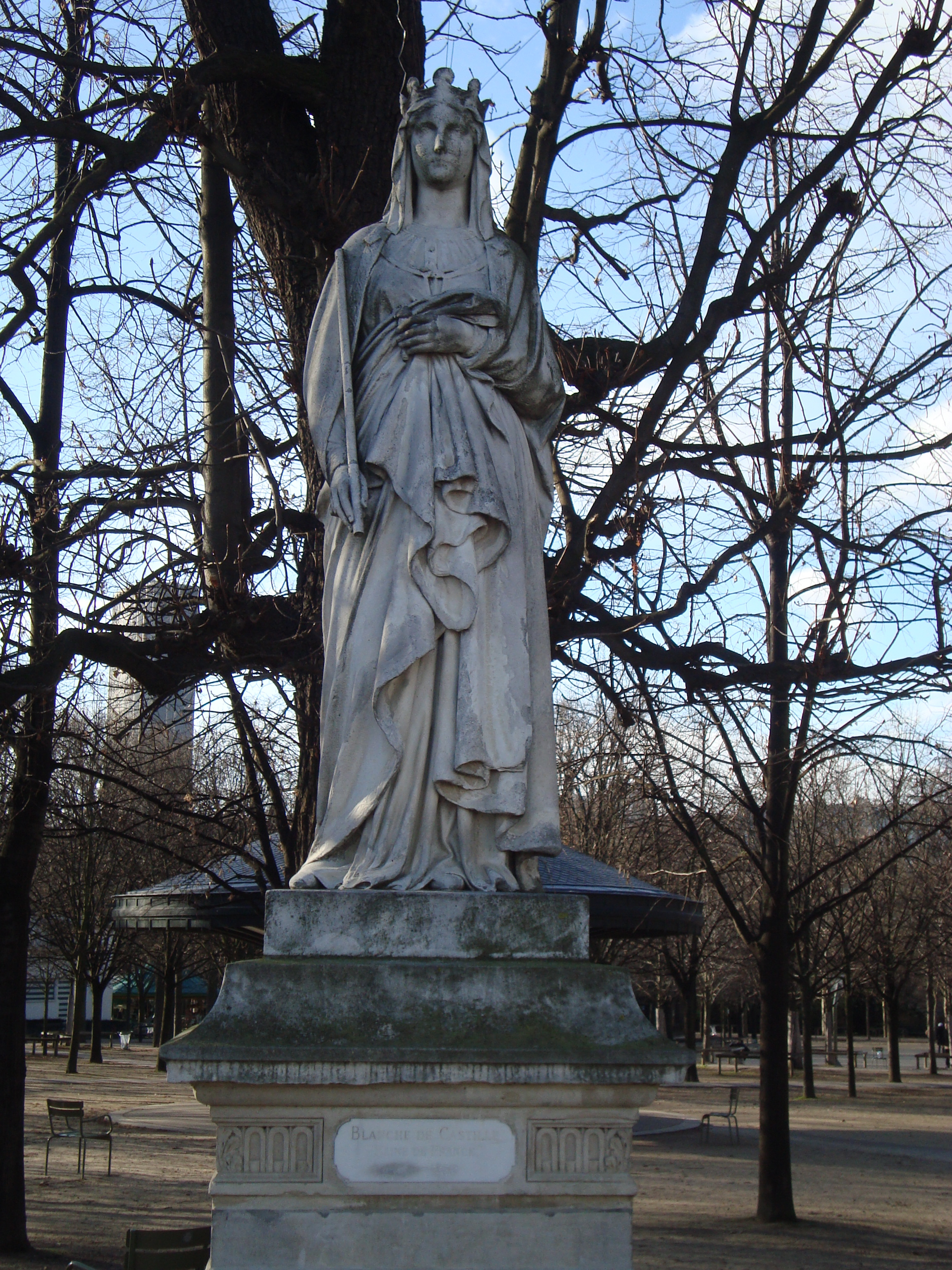
Statue of Blanche of Castile in the Jardin du Luxembourg in Paris.

== In popular culture ==
An image of Blanche of Castile has been used on the home kit of French Rugby union team Stade Français since the 2008 season.

During the 1950s French restaurateur Noël Corbu claimed that Blanche of Castile had deposited a treasure in Rennes-le-Château that was later discovered by Bérenger Saunière during the late 19th century. This was later utilised by Pierre Plantard in his development of the Priory of Sion mythology.

The documentary series Secrets d'Histoire has an episode dedicated to Blanche of Castile.

== Sources ==
- Abulafia, David (1999). The New Cambridge Medieval History: c. 1198-c. 1300. ISBN 978-0521362917.
- Baldwin, John W. (1986). The Government of Philip Augustus: Foundations of French Royal Power in the Middle Ages. University of California Press.364
- Bartal, Ruth (2023). The Book of Ruth and Blanche of Castile. Leiden: Alexandros Press. ISBN 9789490387129.
- Bradbury, Jim (2007). The Capetians: Kings of France, 987-1328. Continuum Books. ISBN 9780826424914.
- Gies, Frances; Gies, Joseph (1978). Women in the Middle Ages. Harper & Row. ISBN 978-0064640374.
- Grant, Lindy (2017). Blanche of Castile, Queen of France. Yale University Press. ISBN 978-0300219265.
- Hanley, Catherine (2016). Louis The French Prince Who Invaded England. Yale University Press.
- Jackson, Guida M. (1999). Women rulers throughout the ages: an illustrated guide. ABC-CLIO, Inc. ISBN 978-1576070918.
- Klaniczay, Gábor (2002). Holy Rulers and Blessed Princesses: Dynastic Cults in Medieval Central Europe. Cambridge University Press. ISBN 978-0521420181.
- Labarge, Margaret W. (1997). A Medieval Miscellany. Canada: Carleton University Press. ISBN 978-0886292904.
- de Montfort, Saint Louis Grignion. The Secret of the Rosary, Thirty-first Rose (#98). "Queen Blanche of Castille (1187-1251), the spouse of King Louis VIII, was deeply grieved because she was still childless after 12 years of marriage. When St. Dominic of Guzman went to see her, he counseled her to say the Rosary every day to ask God for the grace of motherhood. She faithfully carried out his advice. In 1213 she gave birth to her eldest child, Philip, but the child died in infancy."
- Nolan, Kathleen D. (2003). Capetian Women. Palgrave Macmillan US. ISBN 978-0312294489.
- Pernoud, Regine (1975). Blanche of Castile. Coward, McCann & Geoghegan. ISBN 978-0-698-10595-9
- Powicke, Maurice (1999). Loss of Normandy, 1198-1204: Studies in the History of the Angevin Empire. Manchester University Press.
- Putnam, Bill; Wood, John Edwin (2005). The Treasure of Rennes-le-Château: A Mystery Solved. Sutton Publishing. ISBN 978-0-7509-4216-4.
- Shadis, Miriam (2010). Berenguela of Castile (1180–1246) and Political Women in the High Middle Ages. Palgrave Macmillan. ISBN 978-0-312-23473-7.
- Weiler; Burton; Schofield; Stöber (2007). Thirteenth century England: Proceedings of the Gregynog Conference. The Boydell Press. ISBN 9781846157707.
- Wheeler, B.; Parsons, J. (2002). Eleanor of Aquitaine: Lord and Lady. Palgrave Macmillan.
- Wright, Hannah (16 October 2008). "French rugby fans blanche at multi-coloured shirt". The Independent. Archived from the original on 12 April 2011.

Blanche of Castile Castilian House of Ivrea Cadet branch of the House of Ivrea Born: 4 March 1188 Died: 27 November 1252
French royalty
Preceded by Ingeborg of Denmark	Queen consort of France; 1223–1226	Succeeded by Margaret of Provence
