= Longchamp Abbey =

Former abbey in Paris, France

Coordinates: 48.855°N 2.247°E

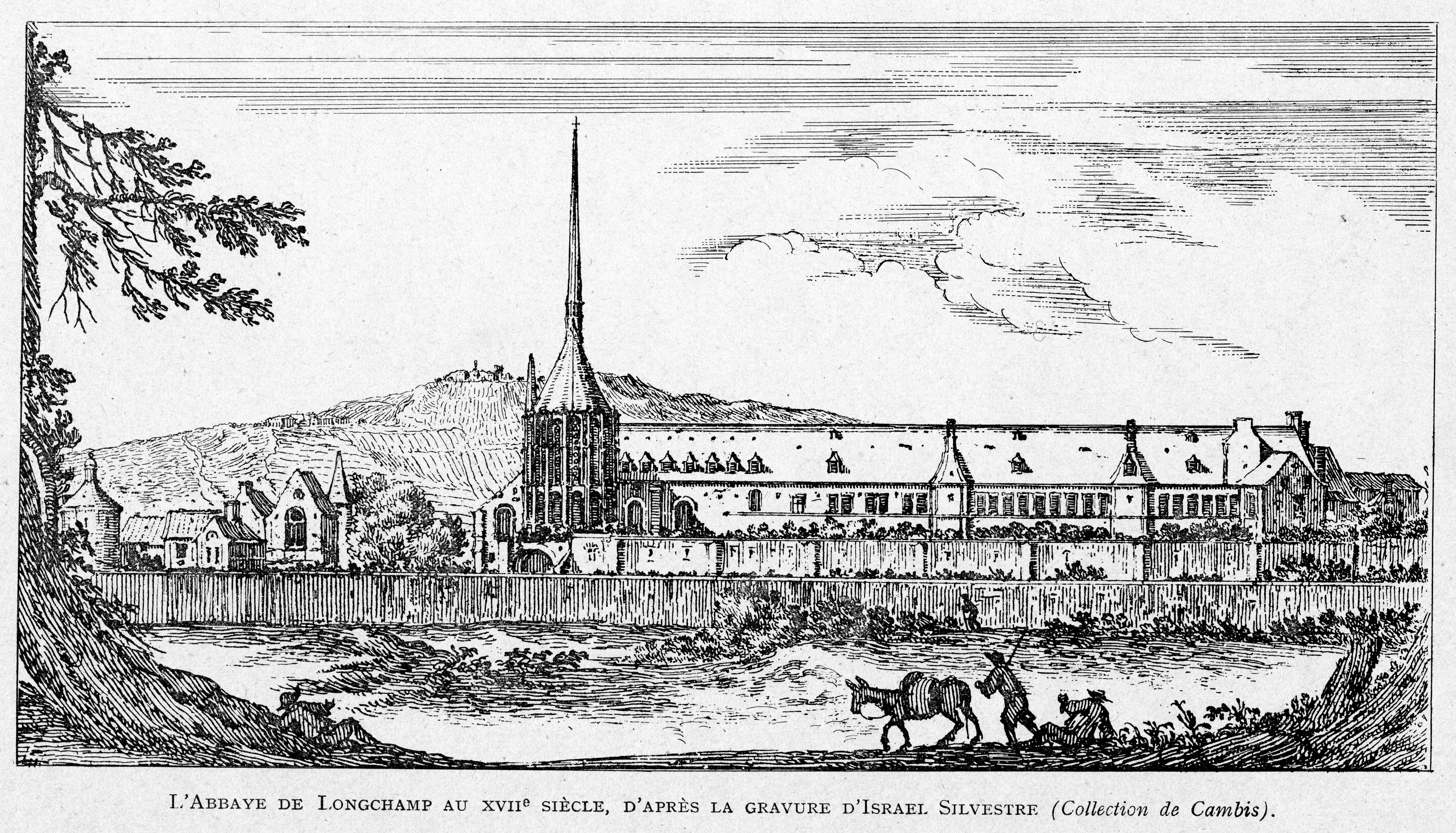
The abbey in the 17th century (engraving by Israël Silvestre)

Longchamp Abbey (French: Abbaye royale de Longchamp), known also as the Convent of the Humility of the Blessed Virgin, was a convent of Poor Clares founded in 1255 in Auteuil, Paris, by Saint Isabelle of France. The site is now occupied by Longchamp Racecourse.

== Royal Foundation ==
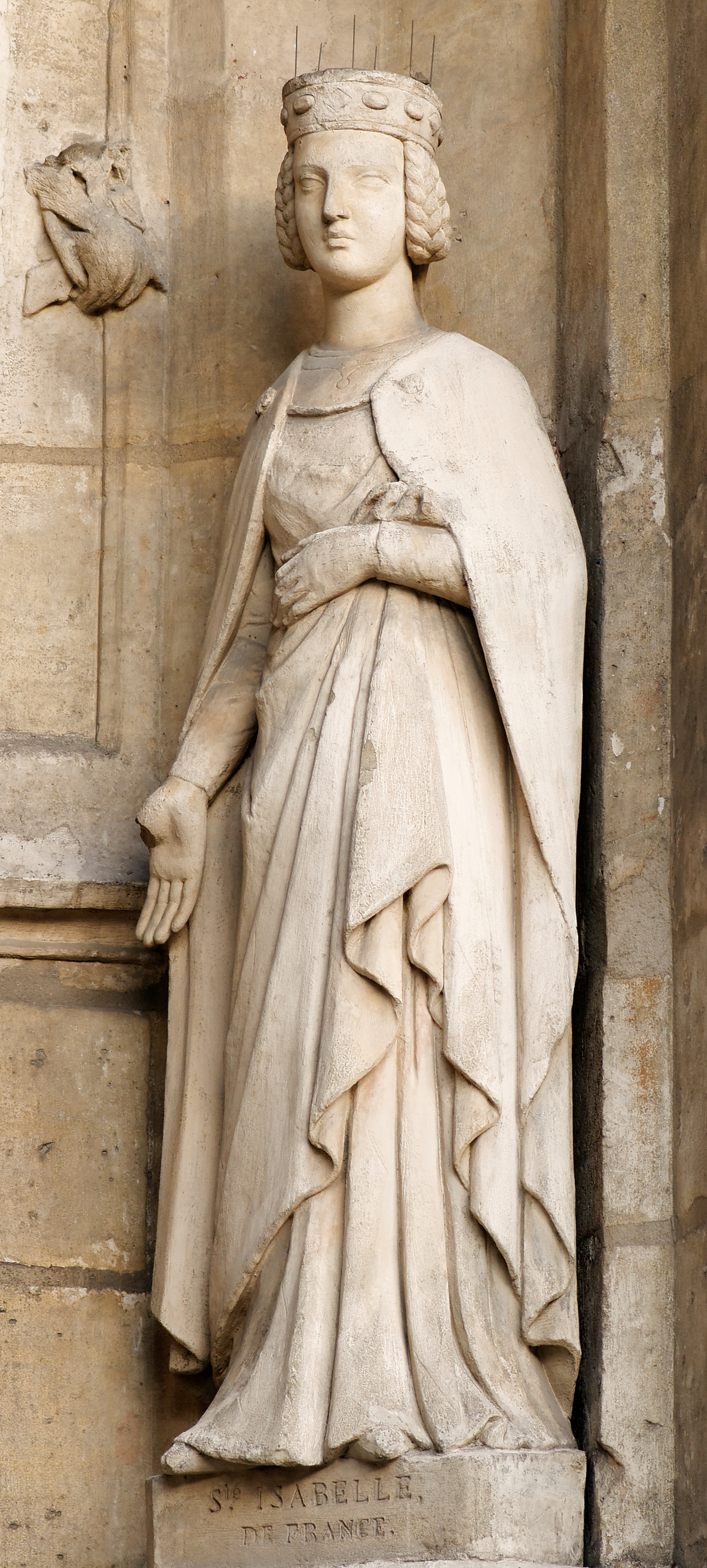
Saint Isabelle, founder of Longchamp (Saint-Germain-l'Auxerrois, Paris)

Isabelle was the daughter of Louis VIII of France and Blanche of Castile, and the younger sister of King Louis IX of France (Saint Louis). Though betrothed to Hugh, eldest son and heir of Hugh X of Lusignan, Isabelle refused to celebrate the formal wedding due to her fixed determination to remain a virgin, although she never became a nun.

In furtherance of Isabelle's wish to found a nunnery of Poor Clares, her brother King Louis IX of France began in 1255 to acquire the necessary land in the Forest of Rouvray, not far from the Seine, west of Paris. On 10 June 1256, the first stone of the monastic church was laid. The building appears to have been completed about the beginning of 1259. The less rigorous Rule of Mansuetus allowed the community to hold property. The abbey was named the "Convent of the Humility of the Blessed Virgin". Subject to the Order of Friars Minor, some of the first nuns came from the Poor Clares in Reims. Isabelle never joined the community herself, but did live in the abbey, in a room separate from the nuns’ cells. The King visited often and remembered the Abbey in his will. Isabelle died at Longchamp on 23 February 1270, and was buried in the abbey church.

== Abbesses of Longchamp ==
- Agnès I d'Anneri 1259-1262
- Mathilde de Guyencourt 1262-1263
- Agnès II d’Harcourt 1264-1275
- Julienne de Toyes 1275-1279
- Agnès II d’Harcourt 1279-1287
- Jeanne I de Nevers 1288-1294
- Jeanne II de Grèce 1294-1303
- Jeanne III de Vitry 1303-1312
- Jeanne IV d’Harcourt 1312-13??
- Jeanne V de Gueux 13??-1328
- Marie I de Lions 1328-1347
- Jeanne VI de Boucheville 1347-1349
- Agnès III de Liège 1349-1357
- Marie II de Gueux 1357-1369
- Agnès IV La Chevrel 1369-1375
- Jeanne VII de La Neuville 1375-1390
- Laurence Jacob 1390-13??
- Jeanne VIII de La Godicharde 13??-1402
- Agnès V d'Issy 1402-1418
- Jeanne IX des Essarts 1418-1437
- Marie III de La Poterne 1437-1451
- Marguerite I Gentianne 1451-1467
- Jeanne X La Porchère 1467-1484
- Jeanne XI Gerente 1484-1500
- Jacqueline de Mailly 1500-1514
- Jeanne XII de Hacqueville 1514-1532
- Catherine I Picard 1532-15??
- Jeanne XIII de Mailly 15??-1540
- Georgette Cœur 1540-1550
- Louise de Cerasme 1550-1559
- Marie IV Lottin 1559-15??
- Charlotte de La Chambre 15??-1567
- Anne I de Fontaines 1567-1580
- Jeanne XIV de Mailly 1580-1604
- Françoise Potier 1604-1606
- Bonne d'Amours 1606-1608
- Catherine II Brûlart de Sillery 1608-1629
- Claudine I Isabelle de Mailly 1629-1634
- Isabelle II Mortier 1634-16??
- Madeleine Placain 16??-1653
- Catherine III de Bellièvre 1658-1668
- Claudine II de Bellièvre 1668-1670
- Claudine I Isabelle de Mailly 1670-1673
- Catherine III Marie Dorat 1673-1676
- Catherine-Elisabeth I de Gournay 1676-1679
- Marguerite II Isabelle de Flecelles, 1679-1683
- Catherine III Marie Dorat 1683-1685
- Marie-Anne I Dorat 1685-1688
- Anne-Marie de Bragelongne 1688-1691
- Catherine III Marie Dorat 1691-1694
- Marie-Anne I Dorat 1694-1697
- Catherine III Marie Dorat 1697-1700
- Marie-Anne I Dorat 1700-1700
- Elisabeth-Henriette Guignard 1700-1703
- Catherine III Marie Dorat 1703-1706
- Marguerite III Agnès Nolet 1706-1709
- Elisabeth-Henriette Guignard 1709-1712
- Marguerite III Agnès Nolet 1712-1715
- Catherine-Elisabeth II Le Cosquino 1715-1718
- Marguerite III Agnès Nolet 1718-17??
- Catherine-Elisabeth II Le Cosquino 17??-1721
- Marie-Anne II Le Jau 1721-1724
- Catherine-Elisabeth II Le Cosquino 1724-1730
- Marie-Anne II Le Jau 1730-1733
- Catherine-Elisabeth II Le Cosquino 1733-1737
- Catherine IV Thérèse de Tourmont 1737-1740
- Anne II Louise de Tourmont 1740-17??
- Marie V Jeanne Jouy 17??-1790

== Destruction ==
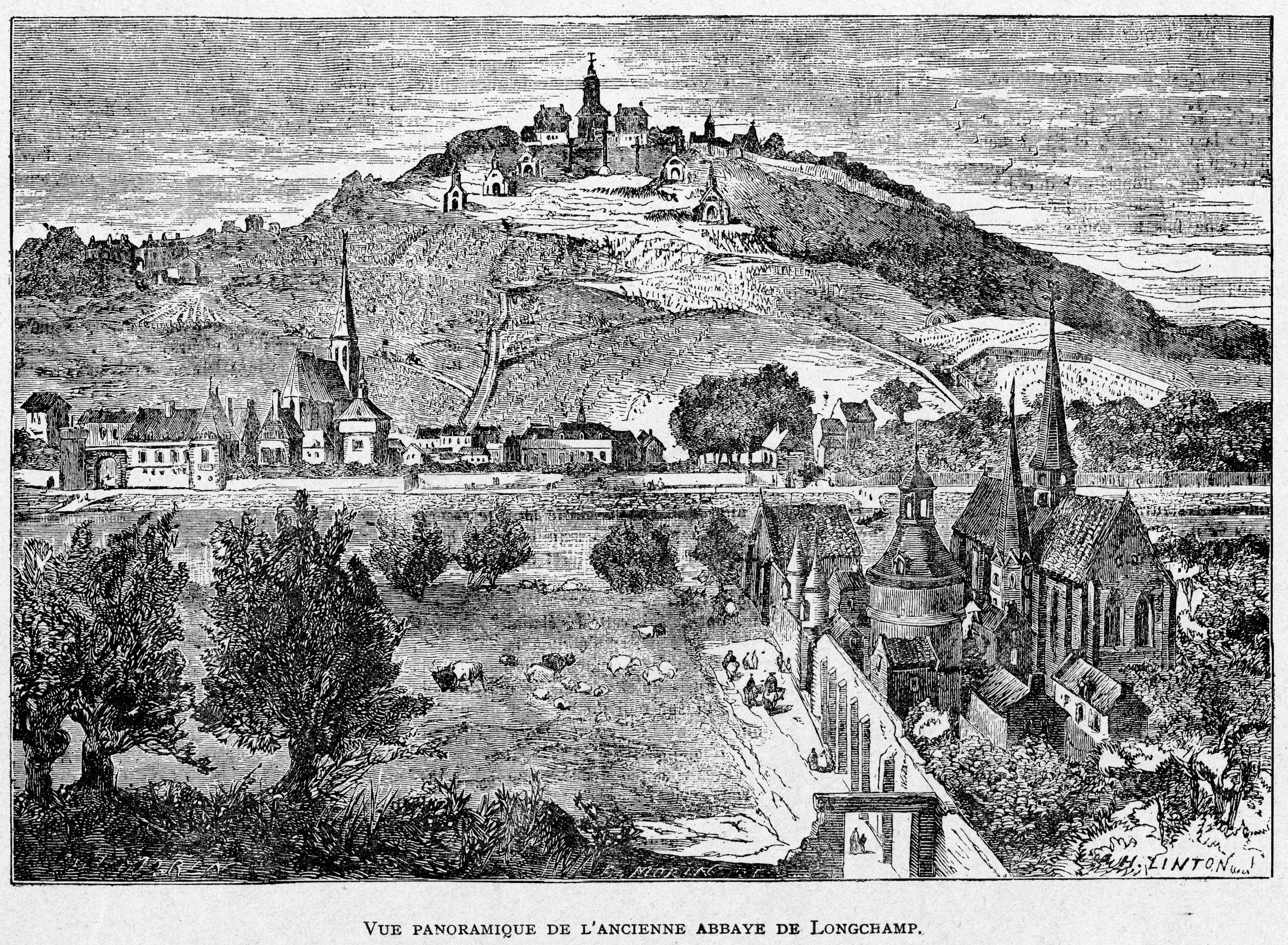
Ruins of Longchamp Abbey (engraving by Edmond Morin c. 1856)

Longchamp Abbey underwent many vicissitudes. During the French Revolution, on 26 February 1790, the nuns were served with an order of expulsion; on 17 September 1792 the valuables and sacred objects were taken away from the chapel and by 12 October that year the nuns had left the abbey. In 1794 the empty building was offered for sale, but, as no one wished to purchase it, it was destroyed. In 1857 the remaining walls were pulled down, except for one tower, and the grounds were added to the Bois de Boulogne.

== Depictions ==
- Misbach, Vue de l'abbaye de Longchamp prise du pied du jardin de M. Lagarde, Bibliothèque nationale de France, Paris.

== See also ==
- Prix de l'Abbaye de Longchamp (a flat horse race, open to thoroughbreds aged two years or older, run at Longchamp Racecourse each year in early October).
