= History of Île-de-France =

History of the region of France that surrounds its capital, Paris

Coordinates: 48°52′N 2°20′E

Province of Île-de-France
- Flag Coat of arms

- Capital: Paris
- Demonym: Francie; France
  - Type: General Government

The Île-de-France is a province of France encompassing the north-central departments of Val-d’Oise, Seine-et-Marne, Seine-Saint-Denis, Ville-de-Paris, Hauts-de-Seine, Val-de-Marne, Essonne, and Yvelines. It is bounded by the regions of Picardy (Picardie) to the north, Champagne-Ardenne to the east, Burgundy (Bourgogne) to the southeast, Centre to the south, and Haute-Normandie to the northwest. Its capital is Paris and it has an area of 4,637 square miles (12,011 square km), and a population of 11,491,000 (2006).

== Geographic definition ==
The region lies in the center of the Paris Basin and consists of limestone plains with a gently rolling relief. Its principal rivers are the Seine and its tributaries, the Marne, Oise and Aisne. The province of Île-de-France encompasses the north-central territories of Val-d’Oise, Seine-et-Marne, Seine-Saint-Denis, Ville-de-Paris (Paris), Hauts-de-Seine, Val-de-Marne, Essonne and Yvelines. Some parts of the historic province are now incorporated into the present-day region of Hauts-de-France, while other parts of the present-day région Île-de-France are taken from the historic province of Champagne. See French history.

== Early history ==
The history of Île-de-France (Isle of France) dates back to the medieval period. The name Isle de France is first recorded in 1387, when the term "France" designated certain crown territories. Literally, the name "Island of France" was derived from its being bordered by the rivers Seine, Oise and Marne (tributaries of the Seine) and Beuvronne (a tributary of the Marne), which surround it like an island.

The name may also inherit from the Frankish Lidle Franke / Lilde Franke, or, "little France", but that theory does not hold, given that Frankish had long been an extinct language when the term first appeared in French.

The area around Paris was the original personal domain of the king of France, as opposed to areas ruled by feudal lords of whom he was the suzerain or sovereign. This is reflected by divisions such as the Véxin Français and the Véxin Normand, the former being within the King of France's domain, the latter being within the Duke of Normandy's fief.

Known as Lutetia (Lutece) in ancient times, Paris was conquered by Julius Caesar in 52 BC and existed as a regional center under the Romans and in the early Middle Ages. In 987, Hugh Capet, Count of Paris, became king of France, and under his successors, the Capetians, the city's position as the nation's capital became established.

Often characterized as spirited and rebellious, the people of Paris first declared themselves an independent commune under the leadership of Etienne Marcel in 1355–58. The storming of the Bastille in 1789 was the first of a series of key actions by the Parisian people during the French revolution. Paris also played a major role in the revolutions of 1830 and 1848. In 1871, during the Franco-Prussian war, the city was besieged for four months until France surrendered. After German troops withdrew, French radicals briefly established the commune of Paris. During World War I the Germans were prevented from reaching Paris, but they occupied the city during World War II from 1940 to 1944. Paris was again the scene of violence during the student riots of 1968.

Paris today maintains its importance, character, and charm, though its appearance is being transformed by structures such as Beaubourg and by the ambitious building program carried out under the presidency of François Mitterrand. In addition to the La Défense arch and the Bastille Opéra, Mitterrand's projects have included the renovation of the Louvre museum by architect I. M. Pei, the La Villette complex on the northeastern edge of the city, and, in the southeast, the Bibliothèque de France, a great computer-age library.

Planning for Paris and the Paris Basin region includes consideration of large land areas in the Seine River valley all the way to the mouth of the river. New towns, parks, industrial locations, and expanded functions of existing towns are contemplated for this corridor on both sides of the Seine.

== Modern history ==
On 4 February 1959, the District of the Paris Region (district de la région de Paris) was created by a government decree. Due to a lack of cooperation from the communes and the departments of the region, who refused to send their representatives to the district council, it was deemed a failure.

The District of the Paris Region was recreated on 2 August 1961 with the same name, but this time by a statute (bill) voted by the French Parliament. The borders of this new region were coterminous with those of the current Île-de-France region. The district council of the aborted 1959 District of the Paris Region was replaced by a Board of Trustees, half of whose members were appointed by the French government, and the other half by the local communes and departments. The executive of the district was a civil servant, the Delegate General for the District of the Paris Region, appointed by the French government.

On 10 August 1966, the Prefectures of the Paris Region were created, whose borders were coterminous with those of the District (and to that of the current Île-de-France region). The Delegate General for the District of the Paris Region was made Prefect of the Paris Region, holding both offices at the same time. The district was renamed from "district de la région de Paris" to "district de la région parisienne" on 17 December 1966.

The District of the Paris Region was reconstituted into the Île-de-France region on 6 May 1976, thus aligning the status of the region with that of the other French regions, created in 1972. The Prefecture of the Paris Region was renamed Prefecture of Île-de-France (Préfecture de L'Île-de-France). The former Board of Trustees was replaced by a regional council, 70% of whose members were the representatives of the departments and communes of Île-de-France. The remaining 30% were chosen by the Members of the French Parliament whose constituencies lay inside Île-de-France. The regional council elected a president with limited executive powers. The office of Delegate General was abolished. It was said that President Valéry Giscard d'Estaing personally insisted on choosing the name "Île-de-France" for the region, instead of the previously used Région Parisienne.

On 2 March 1982, Île-de-France, like the other French regions, was turned into a "territorial collectivity". In other words, it was changed from an administrative region of the state to a full-fledged political entity, on par with the departments and communes. The powers of the regions were expanded, direct elections of the regional councils were scheduled, and the presidents of the regional councils were given full executive powers.

The first direct election of the regional council by the inhabitants of Île-de-France was held on 16 March 1986. The powers and visibility of the region were henceforth greatly increased as the process of devolution and regionalisation increased.

== Notes ==
=== Subprovinces and their principal cities ===
The historic subprovinces (pays) of the Isle of France

Coat of arms of the Isle of France

The Île-de-Province was divided into several sub-provinces (French: pays). They were not administrative areas, but historic and cultural areas going back to the Western Roman Empire and readily identified by their inhabitants. Below is a list of the pays which made up the Île-de-France province, with their principal cities:

- Beauvaisis – Beauvais
- Brie française – Brie-Comte-Robert
- Gâtinais français – Nemours
- Hurepoix – Arpajon, Limours
- Laonnois – Laon
- Mantois – Mantes-la-Jolie
- Noyonnais, Quart de Noyon – Noyon
- Parisis (also known as Pays de France) – Paris
- Soissonnois – Soissons
- Vexin français – Magny-en-Vexin
- Valois – Crépy-en-Valois

== Literature ==
- Pierre Bernus, Histoire de l'Île-de-France, Toulouse, Ancienne Librairie Furne, Boivin et Cie, 1971, 599 p.
- Michel Mollat, Histoire de l'Île-de-France et de Paris, Paris, Privat, coll. " Univers de la France ", 1934, 283 p.
