= Pseudo-Zacharias Rhetor =

Pseudo-Zacharias Rhetor is the designation used by modern scholarship for the anonymous 6th-century author who compiled a twelve-part history in the Syriac language around 569. It contains portions of the otherwise lost Ecclesiastical History of the real Zacharias Rhetor.

The history of Pseudo-Zacharias is found a single manuscript, on vellum, now British Library Add MS 17202, dated to around 600. The title of the history as it appears in the manuscript is A Volume of Records of Events Which Have Happened in the World.

In addition to Zacharias Rhetor's Ecclesiastical History, British Library Add MS 17202 also contains:

- A work by Sylvester, bishop of Rome, on the conversion of the Emperor Constantine.
- The finding of two 1st century relics belonging to Stephen and Nicodemus.
- A story of miracles, the Legend of the Seven Sleepers of Ephesus.
- A translation of Joseph and Aseneth, made by Moses of Ingila in the mid 6th century.
- Two covering letters to "Joseph and Aseneth". The first, by an anonymous individual, provides an account of how the ancient Greek manuscript "Of Aseneth" was found. The second letter is by the Syriac translator, Moses of Ingila. A translation from the Syriac of "Joseph and Aseneth" along with a first ever translation from the Syriac of the two covering letters can be found in Simcha Jacobovici and Barrie Wilson, The Lost Gospel.
