= Moses of Ingila =

Moses of Ingila (fl. mid-6th century) was a Syriac Christian author who translated a number of texts from Greek into the Syriac language.

One surviving letter, preserved in British Library MS no. 17,202, prefaces the writing we call Joseph and Aseneth. Around 550 an anonymous individual, probably a monk, found a very old book in Resh'aina, in the library belonging to the line of bishops who had come from Aleppo. This ancient writing (Joseph and Aseneth) was in Greek, a language with which this individual was less familiar than his native Syriac. Suspecting that it contained a "hidden meaning," he wrote to his friend, Moses of Ingila, asking him to provide a Syriac translation along with an explanation as to its hidden meaning. Moses of Ingila obliges with a Syriac translation which he prefaces with a letter. According to Angela Standhartinger, he explains the story "as an allegory of Christ's marriage to the soul". An English translation of this letter can be found in Simcha Jacobovici and Barrie Wilson, The Lost Gospel along with an English translation of the Syriac text of Joseph and Aseneth.
