= Joseph and Aseneth =

1st-century Christian text in Greek

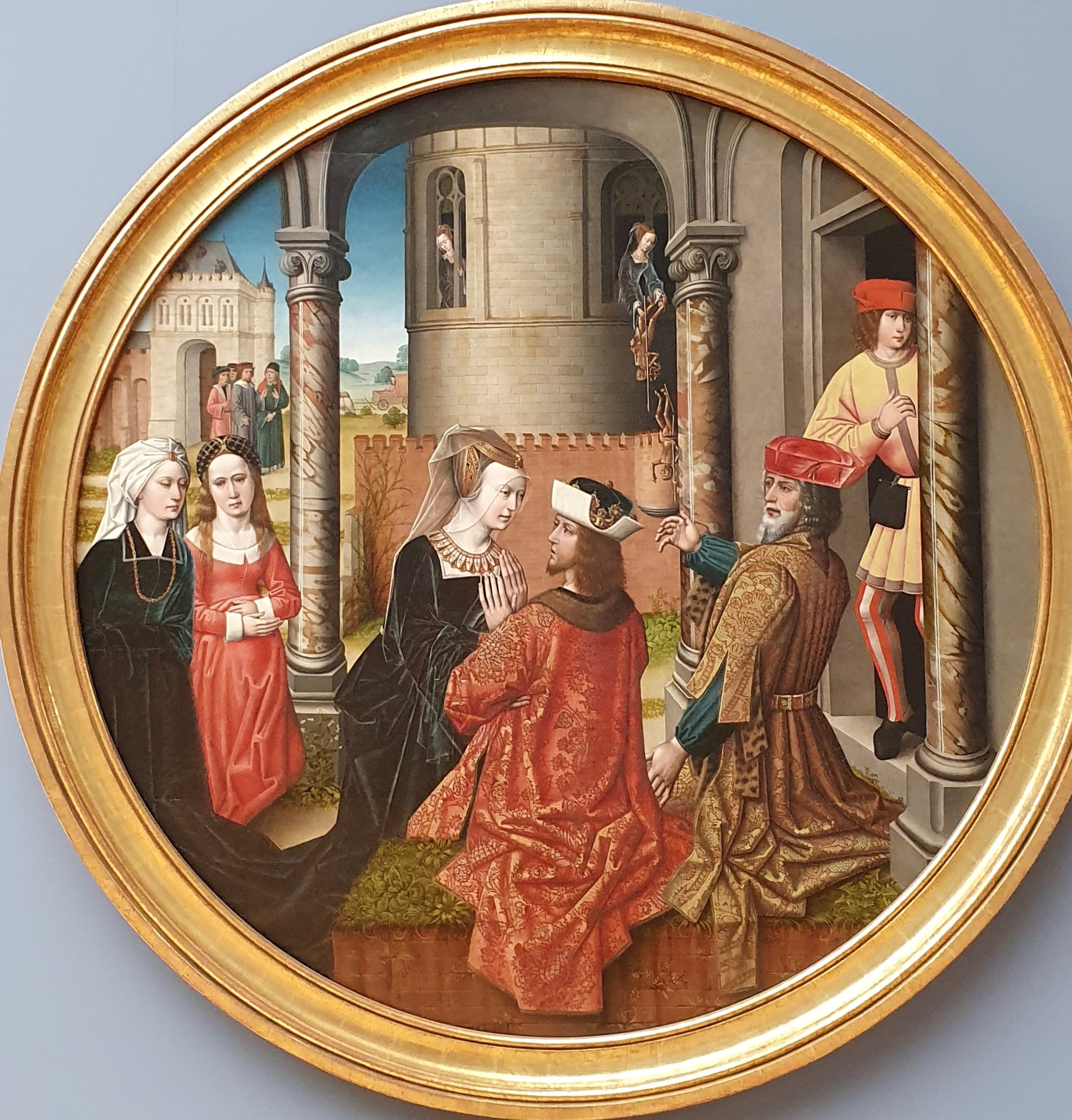
Asenath throws the Idols out of the Tower (Brussels 1490-1500)

Joseph and Asenath is a narrative that dates from between 200 BCE and 200 CE. It concerns the Hebrew patriarch Joseph and his marriage to Asenath, expanding the fleeting mentions of their relationship in the Book of Genesis. The text was translated widely, including into Amharic, Arabic, Armenian, Early Modern German, Latin, Middle English, Old French, Romanian, Serbian and Syriac.

== Summary ==
The first part of the story (chapters 1-21), an expansion of Genesis 41:45, describes the diffident relationship between Aseneth, the daughter of an Egyptian priest of Heliopolis, and the Hebrew patriarch Joseph; the vision of Aseneth in which she is fed honeycomb by a heavenly being; and her subsequent conversion to the god of Joseph, followed by romance, marriage, and the birth of Manasseh and Ephraim. The second part (chapters 22-29) involves a plot by the Pharaoh's son, who recruits Dan and Gad to kill Joseph, only to be thwarted by Benjamin and Levi.

== Origin ==
The work was probably composed in Greek, attested by sixteen Greek manuscripts, and other sources. In the assessment of Richard Cole, "the ultimate provenance of the work is uncertain. Suggestions have ranged from 200 BC to 300 AD from North Africa in the west through to Palestine and Syria in the east".

Some have regarded it as a Jewish midrash or elaboration on the story in Genesis (Genesis 37–50). Others question this interpretation partly because of its provenance (early Syriac Christianity), language (Son of God, Bride of God), symbolism (Eucharistic) and covering letter which appear to indicate a Christian context. Gideon Bohak and others have drawn attention to the geographical location of the story (Heliopolis) and an important Jewish diaspora community centered on a Jewish temple in Leontopolis, located in the nome of Heliopolis during the Ptolemaic period, seeing this as the likely starting point.

The oldest existing manuscript is a Syriac translation, contained in London, British Library, manuscript #17,202, an anthology that contains a variety of texts. The Syriac translation of Joseph and Aseneth was made around 550 CE by Moses of Ingila. The anthology was compiled around 570 CE by an individual whom scholars call "Pseudo-Zacharias Rhetor."

== Ancient and medieval translations ==
=== The Syriac translation ===
The principal manuscript of the Syriac translation of Joseph and Aseneth is London, British Library (formerly British Museum), manuscript #17,202.

Manuscript #17,202 is an anthology, a collection of a number of important writings compiled by an anonymous Syriac author called by scholars Pseudo-Zacharias Rhetor. He labelled his anthology A Volume of Records of Events Which Have Happened in the World. He was likely a monk. This Syriac anthology dates from around 570. It constituted the oldest surviving manuscript of Joseph and Aseneth. The compiler is known as "Pseudo-Zacharias Rhetor" because one of the items found in his anthology is an important church history by the real Zacharias Rhetor. Pseudo-Zacharias Rhetor, whoever he was, did not compose these documents: he compiled them.

Two covering letters to Joseph and Aseneth are included in the compilation and they record how the Syriac translation came to be made. An anonymous Syriac individual, probably a monk, had been looking at manuscripts in Resh'aina (near the border of modern-day Turkey and Syria) in a library belonging to the line of bishops who had come from Aleppo. This individual came across what he termed "a small, very old book" written in Greek "Of Aseneth". The covering letter asks Moses of Ingila to translate it into Syriac, his Greek being rather rusty, and to tell him its "inner meaning". The second covering letter provides Moses of Ingila's response. He says that the writing is a piece of wisdom literature whose inner meaning has to be carefully discerned. He cautions the anonymous monk to be careful. As he is about to disclose its Christological meaning affirming Christianity, the text is cut off: "In short, to tell the truth: our Lord, our God, the Word who, at the will of the father and by the power of the Holy Spirit of the Lord, took flesh, and <became human> and was united to the soul with its senses completely..."

==== Manuscript provenance ====
From the 6th century to the 10th the manuscript was in Mesopotamia. Around 932, the abbot of the ancient Syrian monastery St. Mary Deipara, in the Nitrian desert in Egypt, Moses the Nisibene, acquired over 250 manuscripts from Mesopotamia and Syria for the library, including the manuscript we know as British Library #17,202. The British Museum purchased the manuscript on November 11, 1847, from an Egyptian merchant by the name of Auguste Pacho, a native of Alexandria.

==== Editions ====
In 1870 J. P. N. Land published a transcription of the British Library Joseph and Aseneth in the third series of Anecdota Syriaca. A more thorough edition was then produced by E.W. Brooks, Historia ecclesiastica Zachariae Rhetori vulgo adscripta (CSCO 83; Paris, 1919, reprinted 1053), vol 1, pp. 21–55, along with a Latin translation, Historia ecclesiastica Zachariae Rhetori vulgo adscripta (CSCO 87 Louvain, 1924, reprinted 1953), vol. 1, pp. 15–39.

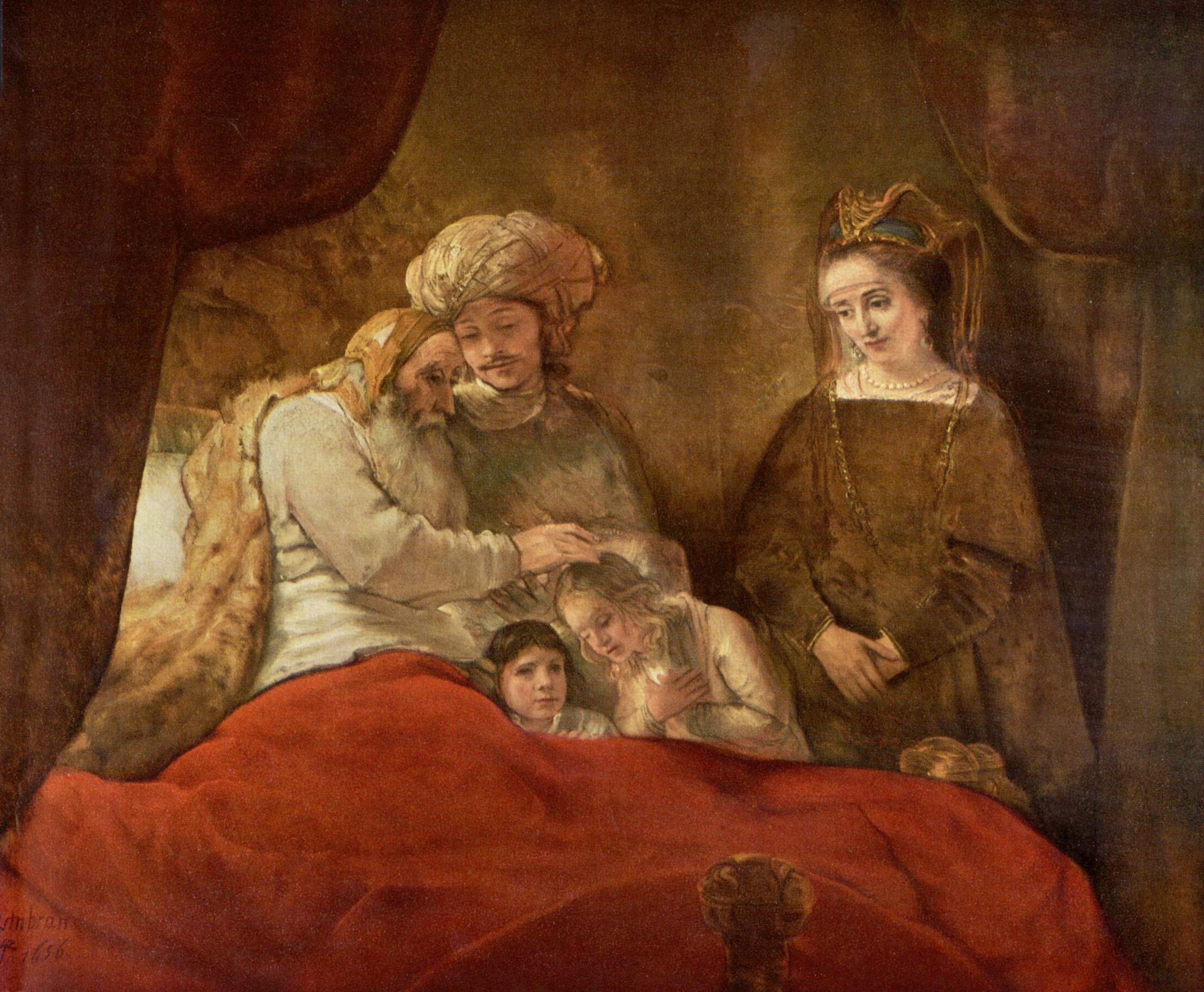
Jacob Blessing Ephraim and Manasseh (Rembrandt)

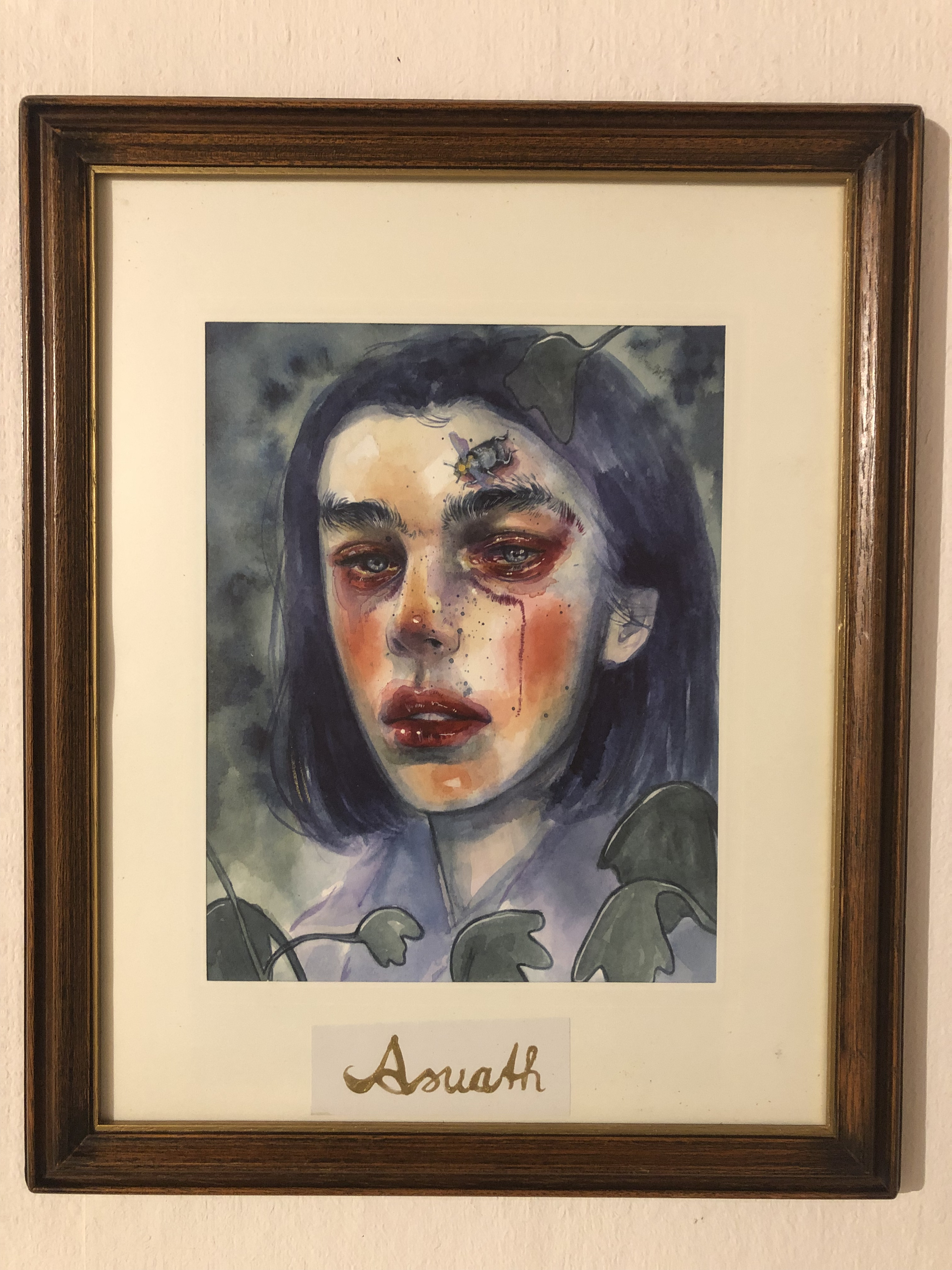
A violet-winged white bee sitting on the face of Asenath in a contemporary painting hanging in the Abbey of Notre-Dame des Dombes

=== Translations in the medieval Latin West ===
Of the Greek Joseph and Asanath a translation into Latin (formerly ascribed incorrectly to Robert Grosseteste) was made in late twelfth-century England (unusually far north for a translation from Greek at this time); nine manuscripts survive of this version, an isolated initiative, all from England, dating back to c. 1200. This Latin version influenced the Old Norse Yngvars saga víðfǫrla. It was also shortened and integrated into Vincent of Beauvais's Speculum Historiale in France in the 1250s. Vincent's version was translated, in Norway, into Old Norse, and integrated into the medieval Norse retelling of the Bible, Stjórn. Around the middle of the fifteenth century it was rendered into Middle English verse, as Storie of Asneth. It was also translated into German and published in 1543 as Die Historie Assenath, which was in turn translated into Danish by Hans Mogensen as Assenaths Historie (published 1580), a version of which was itself translated into Icelandic by Árni Halldórsson between 1657 and 1676, as Historia Assenathis, the first of three independent Icelandic translations of the Danish.

Another Latin manuscript belongs to the University Library, Uppsala, MS C 37, beginning of the 13th century (=436). A final group of four manuscripts is headed by Monastery Library, Vorau (Austria), MS 136, 13th century (=435), Unpublished until 1985.

=== Other translations in the ancient and medieval East ===
There exist also forty-five Armenian manuscripts dated back to the sixth or the seventh centuries, falling into six groups, of which the most important is Matenadaran (Mashtots Institute of Ancient Manuscripts), Erevan, MS 1500 (A.D. 1282-1283) (=332).

Two Serbian-Slavonic manuscripts with minor variants are known, in addition to (at least) two illuminated Modern Greek manuscripts: Monastery of Koutloumousi, Mount Athos, MS 100, 16th century (=661); Bodleian Library, Oxford, Ms Roe 5, 1614 (=671).

== 20th-century interpretation history ==
In 1918, E. W. Brooks published a translation and introduction to Joseph and Aseneth in which he wrote: "that the book in its present shape is the work of a Christian writer will be at once recognized by any reader."

Two English anthologies of Old Testament Apocrypha/Pseudepigrapha include translations of Joseph and Aseneth, all based on Greek manuscripts later than the oldest extant Syriac version. An introduction and translation by C. Burchard is included in James H. Charlesworth's The Old Testament Pseudepigrapha, volume 2. Similarly H.F.D. Sparks includes a translation by D. Cook in his The Apocryphal Old Testament. A list of extant manuscripts and 20th century interpretation history can be found in the introductions to these two anthologies.

The inclusion of Joseph and Aseneth in these anthologies seem to suggest that the editors and translators were under the impression that the author was Jewish and that the work had something to do with Jewish apocryphal literature. This accords with Burchard's judgment in 1985. He writes: "Every competent scholar since Batiffol has maintained that Joseph and Aseneth is Jewish, with perhaps some Christian interpolations; no one has put the book much after A.D. 200, and some have placed it as early as the second century B.C. As to the place of origin, the majority of scholars look to Egypt."

Views as to origin include: written in Israel by an Orthodox Jew (Aptowitzer); in Israel written by an Essene (Riessler); in Alexandria composed by a member of the Therapeutae (K.G. Kuhn); and elsewhere in Egypt, relating to the Jewish temple in the nome of Heliopolis (founded c. 170 BCE), in the same area as the geographical setting of the story (Bohak). Cook endorsed the view of an earlier French scholar, Marc Philonenko, who thought that it was written by a Jewish author around 100 CE. Its purpose, he maintained was twofold: to present inter-faith marriages between Gentiles and Jews in a positive light, and, secondly, to persuade Jews as to the advantages of such unions. Cook thought that this view was "likely."

All these scholars contend that the author was Jewish and active around the dawn of the 1st century CE. The anthologizers Charlesworth and Sparks seem to concur, with Charlesworth labelling the translation, "First Century B.C. – Second Century A.D." Some recent scholars, however, have challenged this interpretation (see below).

== 21st-century scholarship ==
From the late twentieth century, some scholars have argued that the work is fundamentally Christian. These include Ross Shepard Kraemer, When Aseneth Met Joseph; and Rivka Nir, Joseph and Aseneth: A Christian Book. However, the work may have come from a milieu of the first century CE "when Judaism and Christianity were not separate identities but rather two tendencies within the same continuum".

== As a lost Gospel encoding the Jesus bloodline ==
A 2014 book by Simcha Jacobovici and Barrie Wilson, The Lost Gospel: Decoding the Ancient Text that Reveals Jesus' Marriage to Mary the Magdalene, argues for the marriage of Jesus to Mary Magdalene through a decoding of Joseph and Aseneth, according to the Jesus bloodline hypothesis. The book has been compared to The Da Vinci Code in 2003, as a conspiracy theory.

The authors claim that the story of Joseph and Aseneth was already composed during Jesus' lifetime and precedes the canonical gospels.

The Syriac manuscript, being the oldest manuscript, and its accompanying cover letters are given great weight; the authors commissioned multi-spectral photography to "see through" smudges and other marks on the manuscript to ascertain the original underlying text. The translation into English was by Tony Burke, translator of The Infancy Gospel of Thomas, author of Secret Scriptures Revealed, and editor of Fakes, Forgeries, and Fictions: Writing Ancient and Modern Christian Apocrypha. Burke worked independently and was not informed of the overall project objectives. Burke also prepared the first-ever English translation of the two cover letters in Syriac, which proved more difficult than translating the main text, owing to damage to the manuscript.
