= Lost Gospel =

Lost Gospel may refer to:

- The Lost Gospel (Jacobovici and Wilson book), book by Simcha Jacobovici and Barrie Wilson
- The Lost Gospel, book by Burton L. Mack about the Q document
- New Testament apocrypha
