= Vorau =

- Municipality
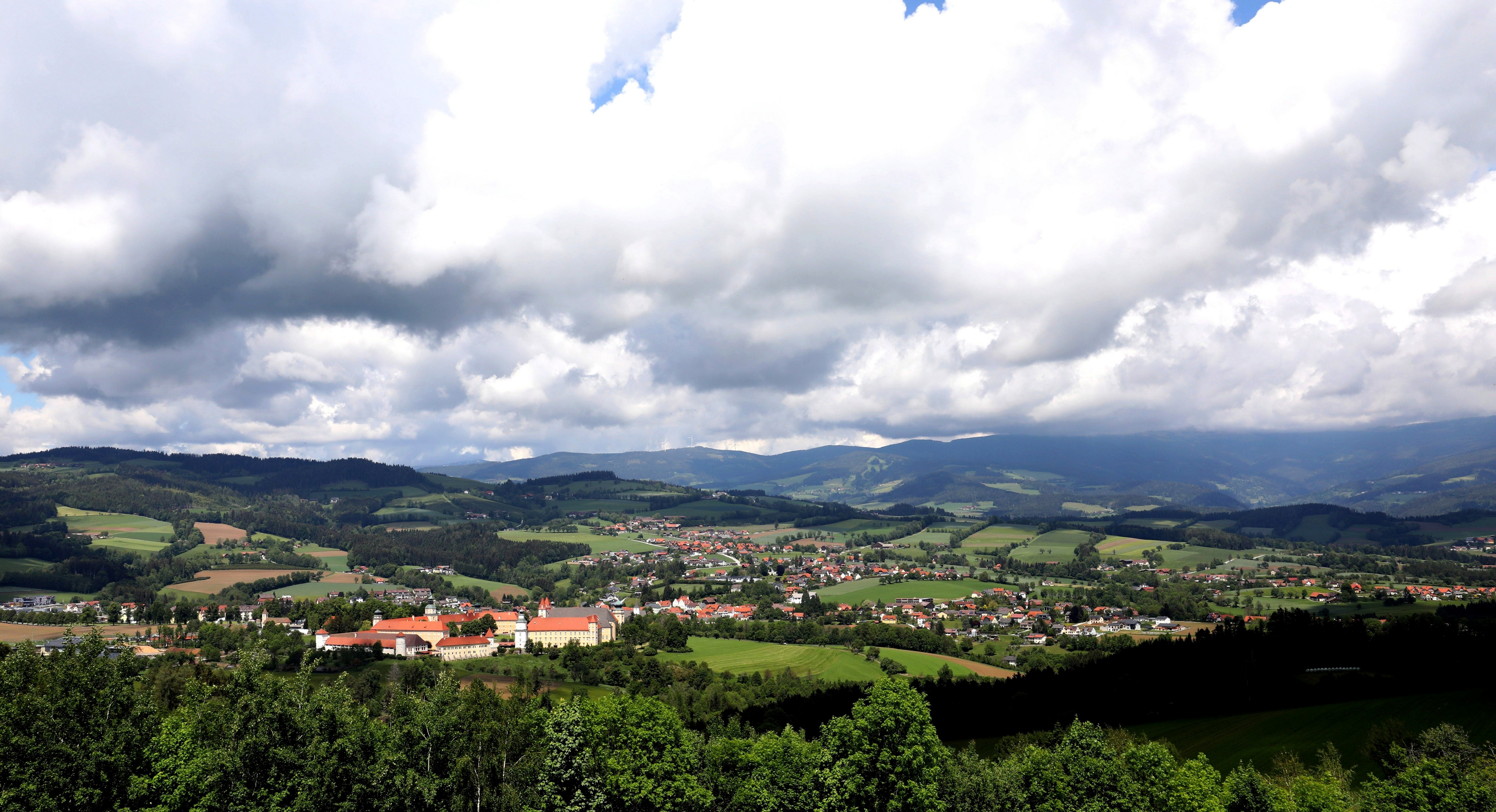

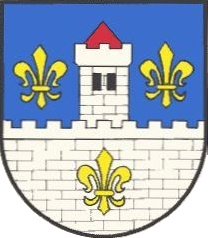
- Coat of arms

- Location within Austria
- Coordinates: 47°24′00″N 15°53′00″E
- Country: Austria
- State: Styria
- District: Hartberg-Fürstenfeld

Government
  - Mayor: Bernhard Spitzer (ÖVP)

Area
  - Total: 80.84 km^{2} (31.21 sq mi)
- Elevation: 660 m (2,170 ft)

Population (2018-01-01)
  - Total: 4,731
  - Density: 58.52/km^{2} (151.6/sq mi)
- Time zone: UTC+1 (CET)
  - Summer (DST): UTC+2 (CEST)
- Postal code: 8250
- Area code: 03337
- Vehicle registration: HB
- Website: www.vorau.at

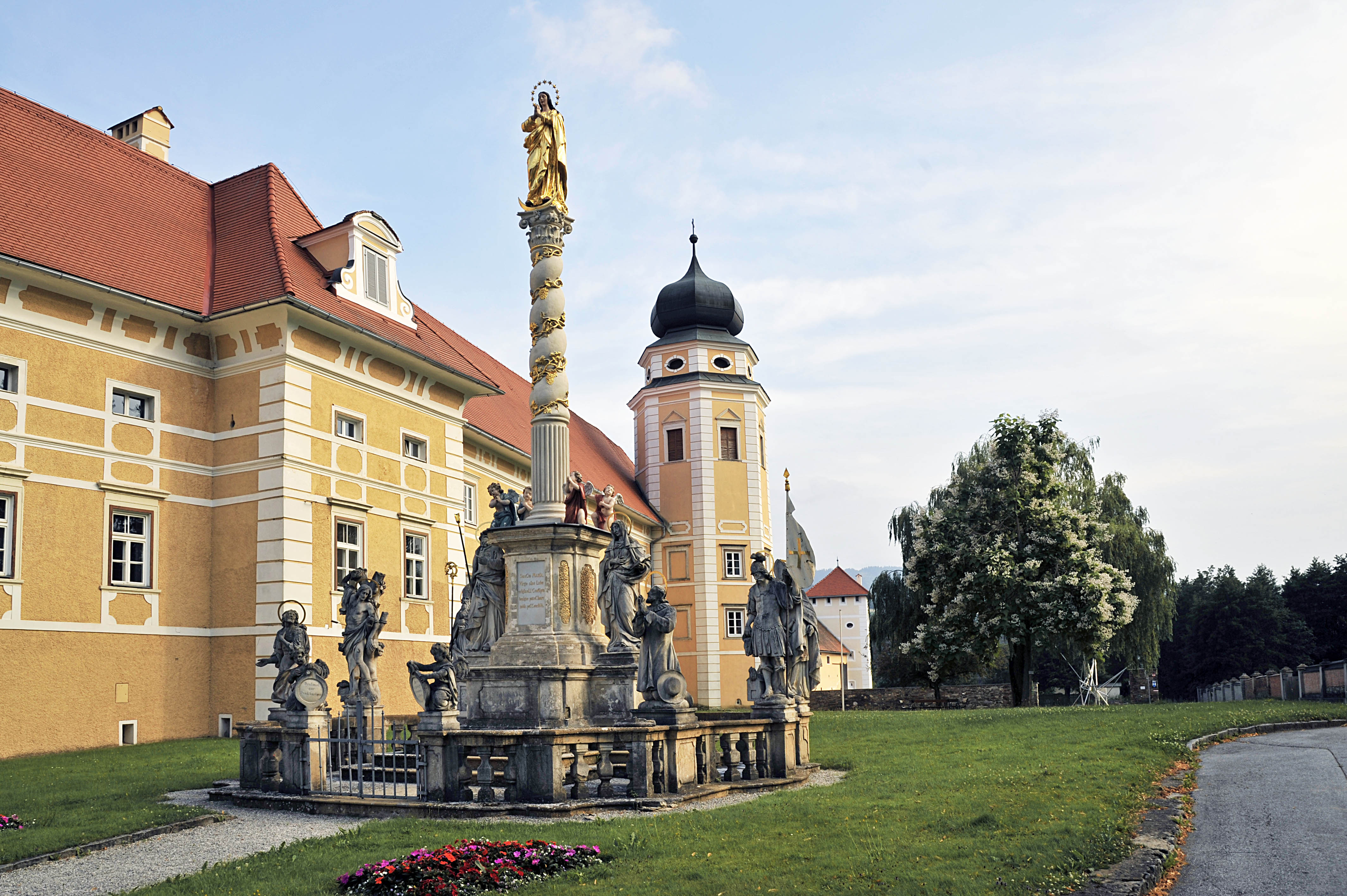
Marian column in Vorau

Vorau is a municipality in the Hartberg-Fürstenfeld District in Styria, Austria. It is home to the Vorau Abbey.
