= How Jesus Became Christian =

2008 book by Barrie Wilson

How Jesus Became Christian (New York: St. Martin’s Press; Toronto, Random House; London, Orion Publishing) is a 2008 book by the Canadian historian and philosopher of religion, Barrie Wilson, which suggests a "cover-up hypothesis" to explain why the religion that evolved from Jesus was so different from what Jesus himself taught and practised.

The historical analysis traces how a human Jewish teacher claiming to be the Messiah became the dying-rising God-human savior of humanity. In the book, Wilson advances “the Jesus Cover-Up” hypothesis, contending that the theology of Paul covered the teachings of Jesus and those of his first followers, the Jesus Movement led by Jesus’ brother James. Wilson shows in detail how Paul’s theology differs from them in terms of origin, teaching and practice.

Having claimed that Paul’s religion differs from that of Jesus and his first followers, Wilson argues that the covering up takes place within the Book of Acts. In this late first-century writing, Paul’s non-Torah-observant movement becomes grafted on to a Torah-observant one, the so-called Council of Jerusalem being an important step in this development. Thus a new model of Christian origins is proposed, that Paul's was a separate religion, with different beliefs and practices than those of Jesus' first followers. This new religion, one with a different origin, becomes attached to the one that first emanated from Jesus. Thus a Jewish religion focused on the Kingdom of God and the messianic era is transformed into a Gentile one that worships a dying-rising saviour God-human. The shift involves moving the focus from the message to the messenger.

Wilson also notes that the Book of Acts represents an influential work of historical revisionism, noting that it is the one work of the Bible that we can compare to something else to judge accuracy. In this case, we can compare what Paul says about himself with what the unknown author of the Book of Acts says about him. The former represents the Paul of history, the latter the mythologized Paul. The discrepancies between the two are significant as the author of Acts tries to downplay the enmity that existed between Paul and James.

The book also traces the evolution of Christian appropriation of Jewish symbols and beliefs as well as the rise of Christian anti-semitism.

How Jesus Became Christian was shortlisted for the Cundill Prize in History. In 2009 the book received the Tanenbaum Award in History at the Canadian Jewish Book Awards.
