= The Lost Gospel (Jacobovici and Wilson book) =

2014 book pertaining to religious studies

The Lost Gospel: Decoding the Ancient Text that Reveals Jesus' Marriage to Mary the Magdalene
- First edition
- Author: Simcha Jacobovici, Barrie Wilson
- Genre: Non-fiction
- Publisher: Pegasus Books
- Publication date: November 12, 2014

The Lost Gospel: Decoding the Ancient Text that Reveals Jesus' Marriage to Mary the Magdalene is a book published by investigative journalist Simcha Jacobovici and Religious Studies historian Barrie Wilson in 2014. It contends that the 6th century manuscript -- by Pseudo-Zacharias Rhetor now British Library Add MS 17202 -- commonly referred to as "Joseph and Aseneth" is really a disguised history.

== Key claims ==
The authors claim that this writing is a Christian rather than a Jewish text on the grounds that it was preserved and transmitted in the eastern Christian context of Syriac Christianity; and that it would be of no interest to monks if it were merely the story of an interracial marriage set in Patriarchal times. Moreover, the narrative contains Christian terminology -- "Bride of God," "Son of God," and Eucharistic symbolism that would have no place within a Jewish context. Joseph and Aseneth is included in an anthology of 6th century manuscripts entitled A Volume of Records of Events that have Shaped the World. Without Christian import, the work would have no place in such a collection of such important writings as a narrative about Constantine's conversion, the finding of ancient relics and proof of immortality (The Seven Sleepers of Ephesus) among them.

The authors point out that work is prefaced by two letters indicating that the work contains "a hidden meaning" and that it is Christological in nature.

Using the interpretive methodology favoured by Syriac Christian scholars -- typological analysis -- the authors decode the writing as having to do with Jesus (Joseph) and Mary Magdalene (Aseneth). The narrative then becomes the story of their courtship, marriage, the children they had and concludes with a plot against their lives (Joseph's two sons Ephraim and Manasseh figuratively representing the children of Jesus and Mary Magdalene). The authors point out that typology represents a very different hermeneutic method than allegorical interpretation.

In decoding the writing, the authors contend that Mary Magdalene is imaged as Artemis and Jesus on Helios. They also examine ancient mosaics that depict Helios and Artemis, the Sun and the Moon, in a chariot sweeping the heavens.

The authors also speculated that while the extant version dates from the 6th century, the writing may portray an early form of Christianity that paralleled the Jewish movement led by James (Jesus' brother), and that this movement may have paved the way for 2nd century Gnosticism.

== Translation of the Syriac narrative and covering Letters ==
In addition to a detailed decoding of the narrative, the book provides the first-ever English translation of Joseph and Aseneth based on the oldest existing text, that is, the Syriac version of the 6th century which is itself based on an earlier Greek account. How much earlier than the 6th century is open to speculation. Modern digital imaging techniques were used to decipher the text hidden by smudges and other marks, thus restoring the manuscript to its original state.

The Lost Gospel also provides the first-ever translation of the two covering letters which explain how the Syriac translation came to be. Around 550, an anonymous individual wrote to his friend, Moses of Ingila. He had come across a "small, very old" book called Of Aseneth in the library in Resh'aina belonging to the bishops who had originally come from Aleppo. Suspecting that it contained a hidden message, he asked Moses of Ingila to translate the work from Greek into Syriac, a language with which he was more familiar. Moses of Ingila obliged, sending him a Syriac translation and noting that it was a work of wisdom, the meaning of which had to be carefully discerned. As he started to indicate the hidden Christological meaning, the text of the covering letter is suddenly cut off, while at the same time affirming the truth of mainstream Christianity as to God's incarnation in the person of Jesus Christ The cut could perhaps have been made deliberately in antiquity according to the authors.

== Reaction by biblical scholarship ==
The book has been dismissed by mainstream Biblical scholarship, for example by Anglican theologian, Richard Bauckham. The idea of a Jesus bloodline is rejected by the overwhelming majority of biblical scholars and scholars of the historical Jesus, such as Bart D. Ehrman, John P. Meier, Géza Vermes, Raymond E. Brown, Maurice Casey and Jeffrey J. Kripal. Even the Jesus Seminar, who supports several heterodox views about the historical Jesus, states that there is no historical evidence of a marriage between Jesus and Mary Magdalene. Conversely there is no biblical passage supporting the view that he wasn't married. Israeli Biblical scholar, Rivka Nir called their work "serious-minded, thought-provoking and interesting", but described the thesis as objectionable,

The Lost Gospel was described as historical nonsense by Markus Bockmuehl.

Author Ross Shepard Kraemer complained that her book When Aseneth Met Joseph: A Late Antique Tale of the Biblical Patriarch and His Egyptian Wife, Reconsidered was distorted by Simcha Jacobovici and Barrie Wilson (revised preface to the 2015 paperback edition).
