= Vorau Abbey =

Augustinian abbey in Styria, Austria

- Stift Vorau
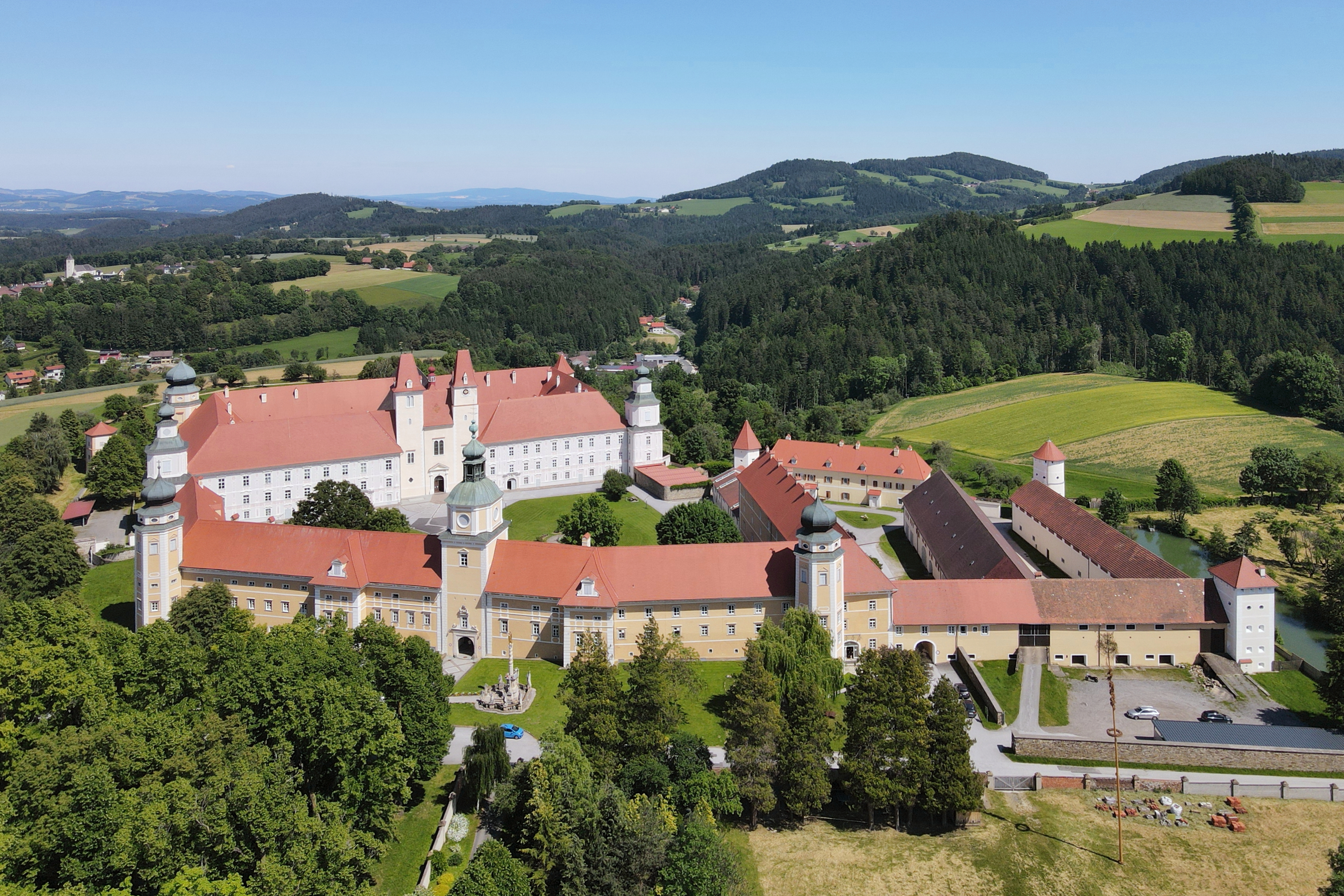

Monastery information
- Order: Austrian Congregation of Canons Regular
- Denomination: Catholic Church
- Established: 1163
- Diocese: Diocese of Graz-Seckau

People
- Founder(s): Ottokar III of Styria

Site
- Location: Vorau, Styria, Austria
- Coordinates: 47°24′03″N 15°53′21″E
- Website: www.stift-vorau.at

Vorau Abbey (German: Stift Vorau) is an abbey of the Austrian Congregation of Canons Regular located in Vorau, Styria, Austria. Founded in 1163, it contains an ornate Viennese High Baroque collegiate church and library that date to the 18th century.

== History ==
Vorau Abbey was founded in 1163 by Margrave Ottokar III of Styria as an act of gratitude for the birth of his son, Ottokar IV. He donated lands to the Archbishop of Salzburg, Eberhard I, who oversaw the abbey's construction. The Austrian Congregation of Canons Regular took up residence upon its completion.

The territory in which the abbey is located was the subject of frequent invasion by neighboring countries. Therefore, the abbey was walled in 1458 and many defensive features were built, including towers, a moat and iron bars at the entrance. With 15 towers, the abbey has more than any other monastery in Austria. With such defenses, the residents of Vorau often sought refuge inside the monastery during time of invasion.

The abbey's first collegiate church was built in the Romanesque style, following a fire in 1237. The church was later redesigned in the Gothic style. It was again rebuilt from 1660 to 1662, designed by Swiss architect Domenico Sciassia. In 1700, the church was finally redesigned by Matthias Steinl in the Viennese High Baroque style. Its high altar was built from 1701 to 1704, while the pulpit dates to 1706. The sacristy is decorated with frescoes by Johann Cyriak Hackhofer, the abbey's resident painter, who created them in 1715 and 1716. Writing in the New Catholic Encyclopedia, local librarian and archivist Pius Fank described the church as the "most splendid baroque church in Styria."

The abbey's library was built in 1731. It contains 40,000 books, 206 incunabula, and 416 manuscripts, as well as the oldest collection of Middle High German poems.

In April 1940, the Nazi government commandeered the abbey, expelling its canons. It was subject to heavy bombardment during World War II. Half of the abbey was destroyed in 1945, though the majority of destruction was confined to outlying farm buildings; the main building, including the church, was largely spared. The abbey's library was significantly damaged during the war, and about 5,000 books were stolen. The canons returned to the monastery after the end of the war in 1945.

The complex remains an active abbey. Parts of it are also used as a school, tavern, and private residences.

== Gallery ==
Exterior
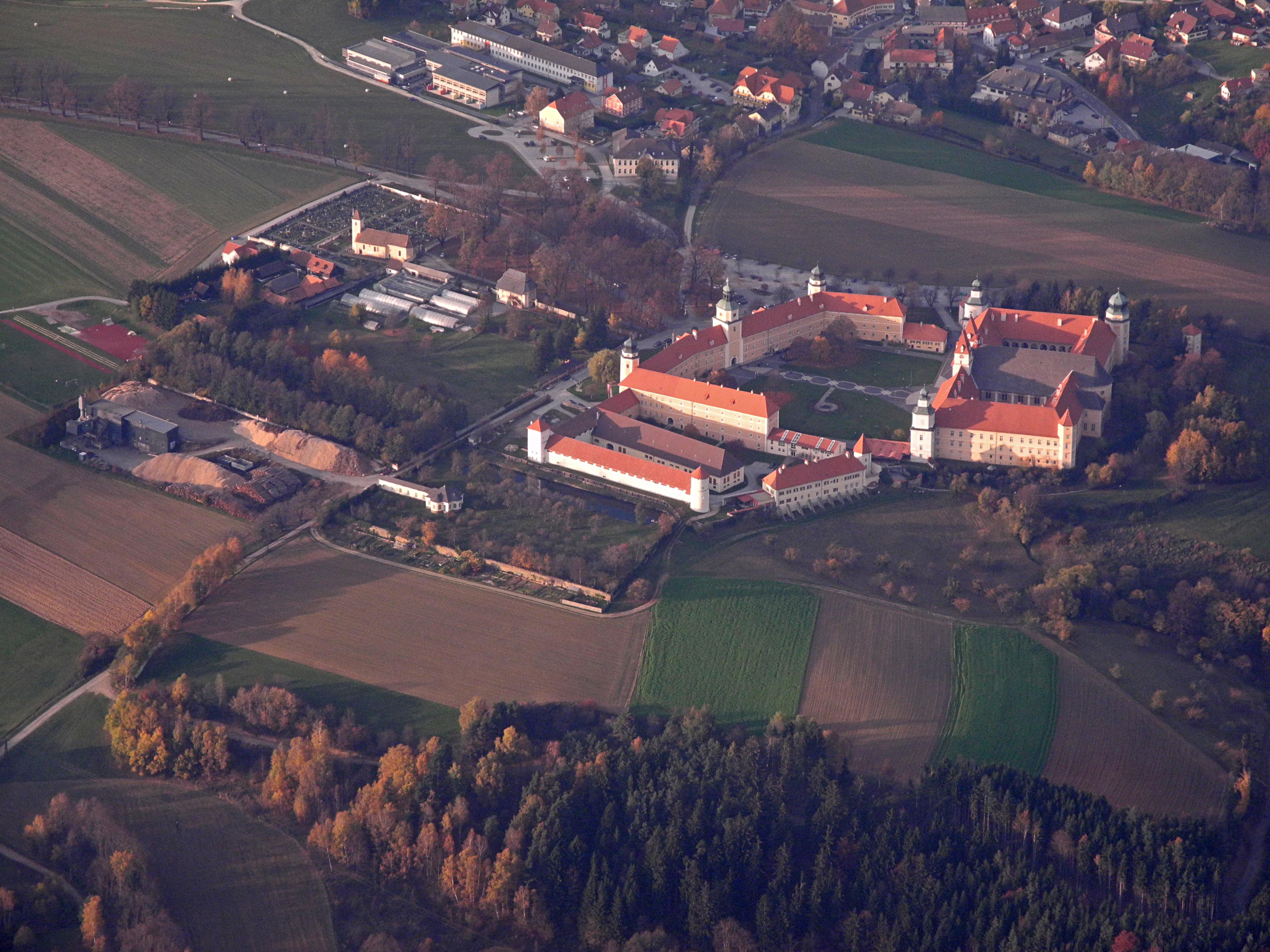
Aerial view of the abbey

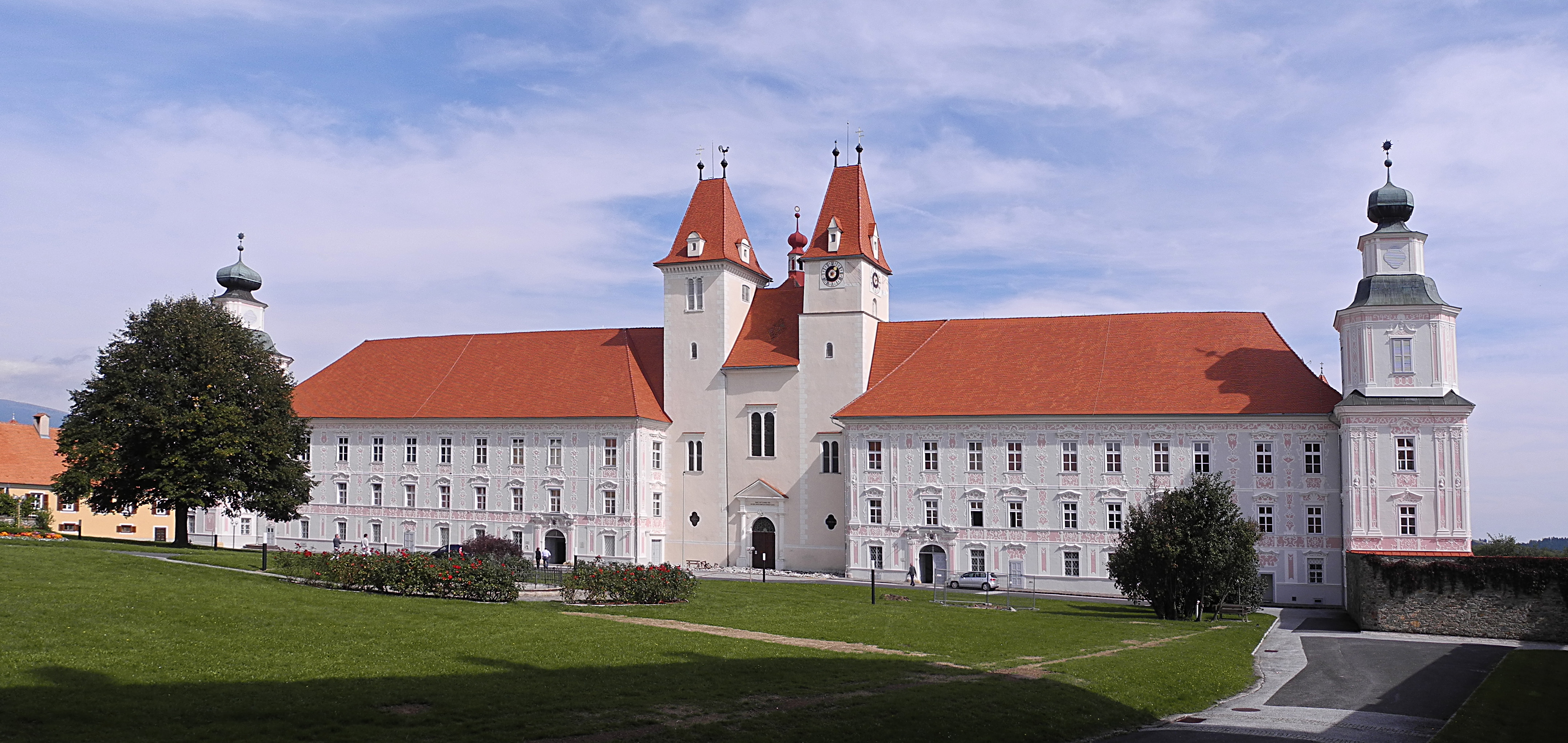
Front facade of the Vorau Abbey

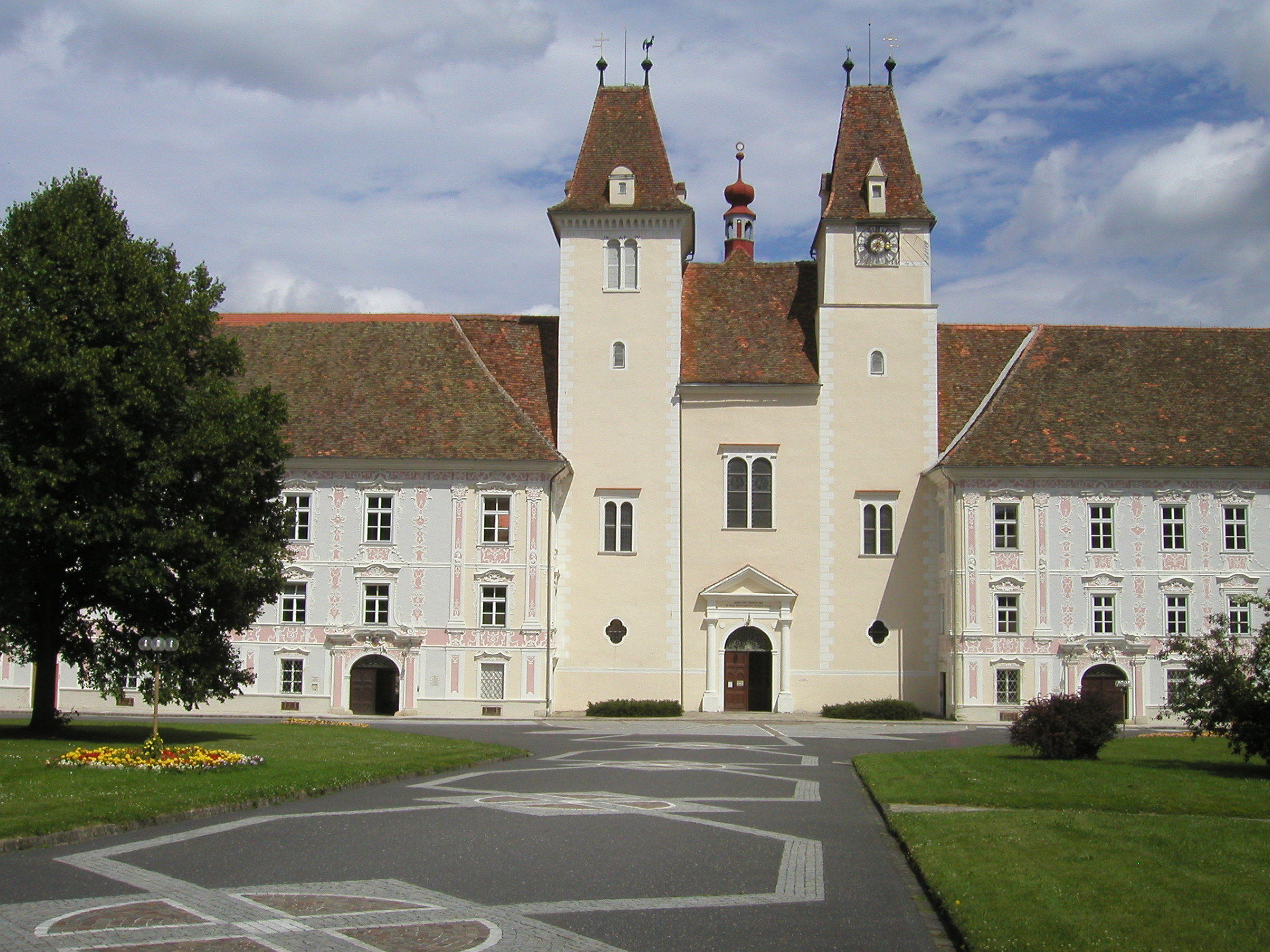
Entrance

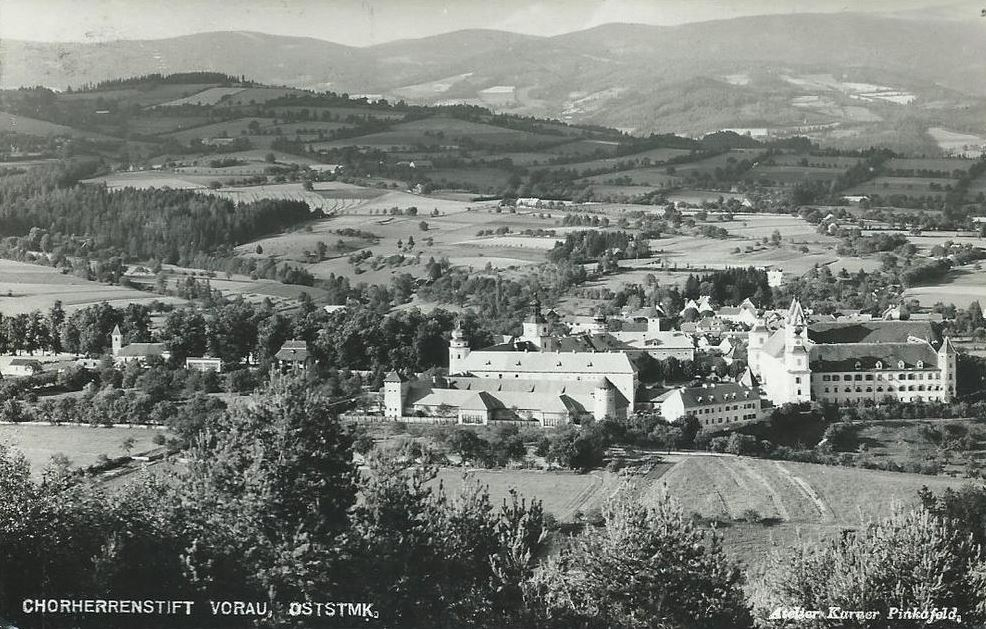
Abbey in 1940

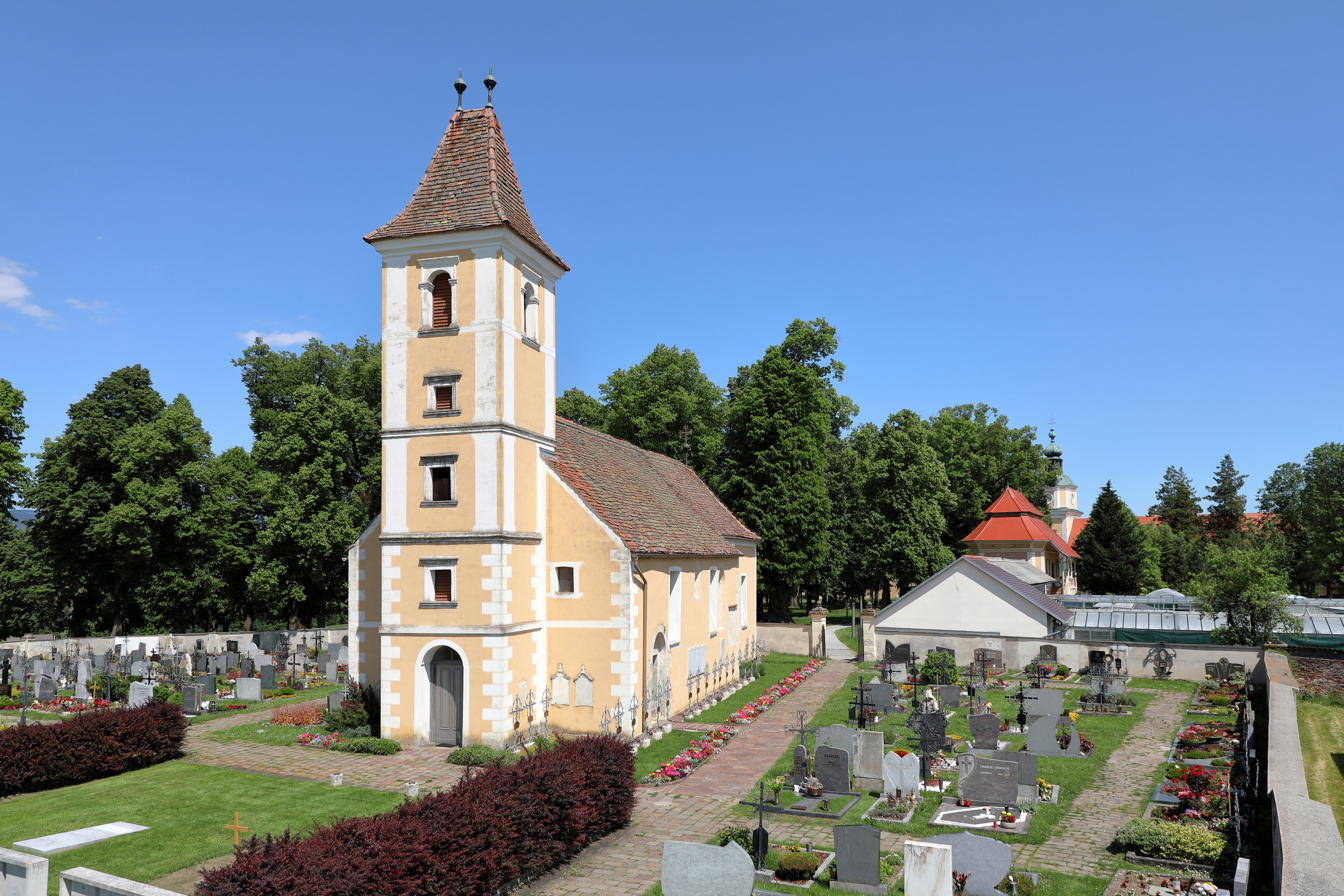
Church at the monastery cemetery

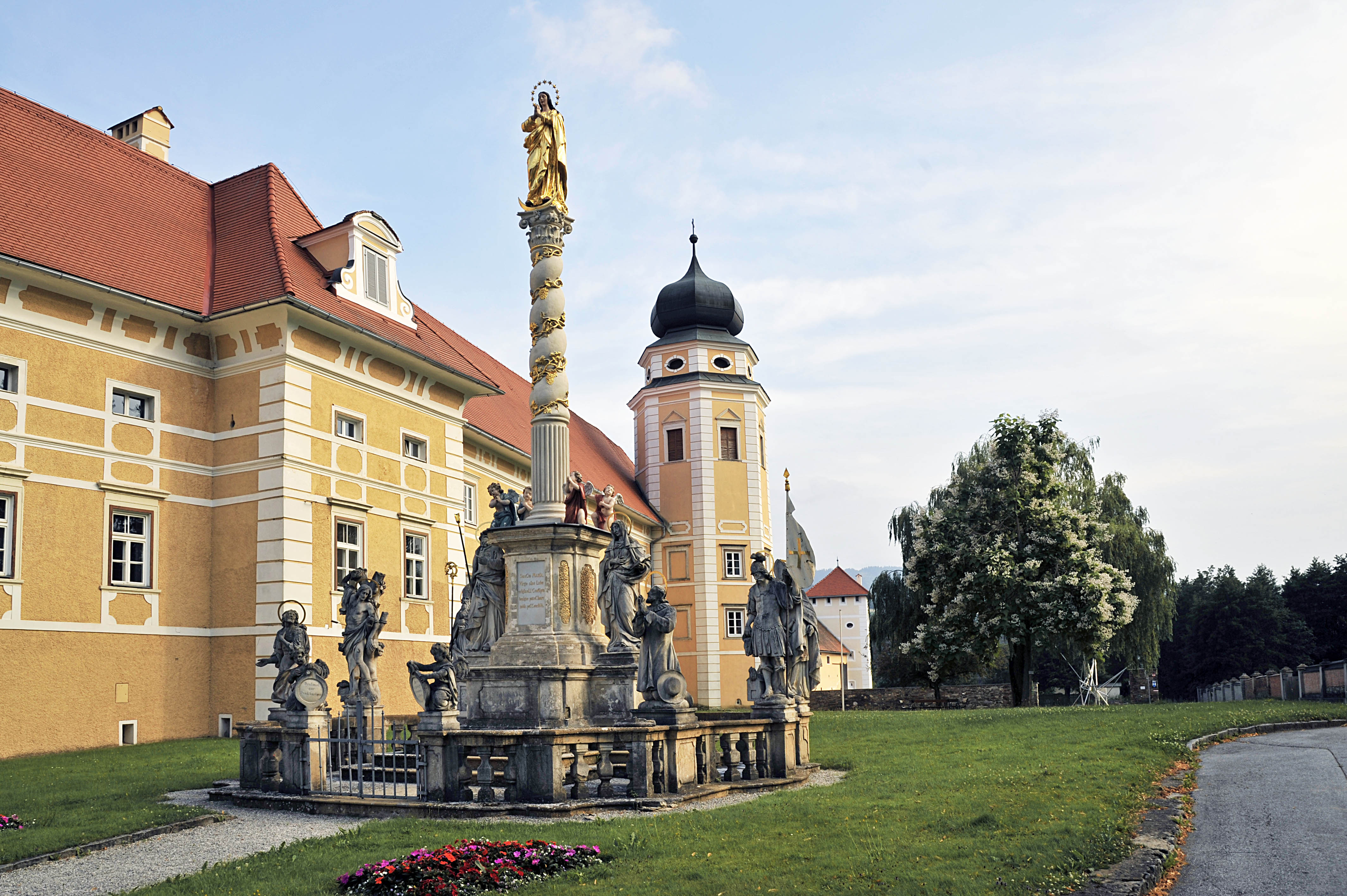
Marian column
Church interior
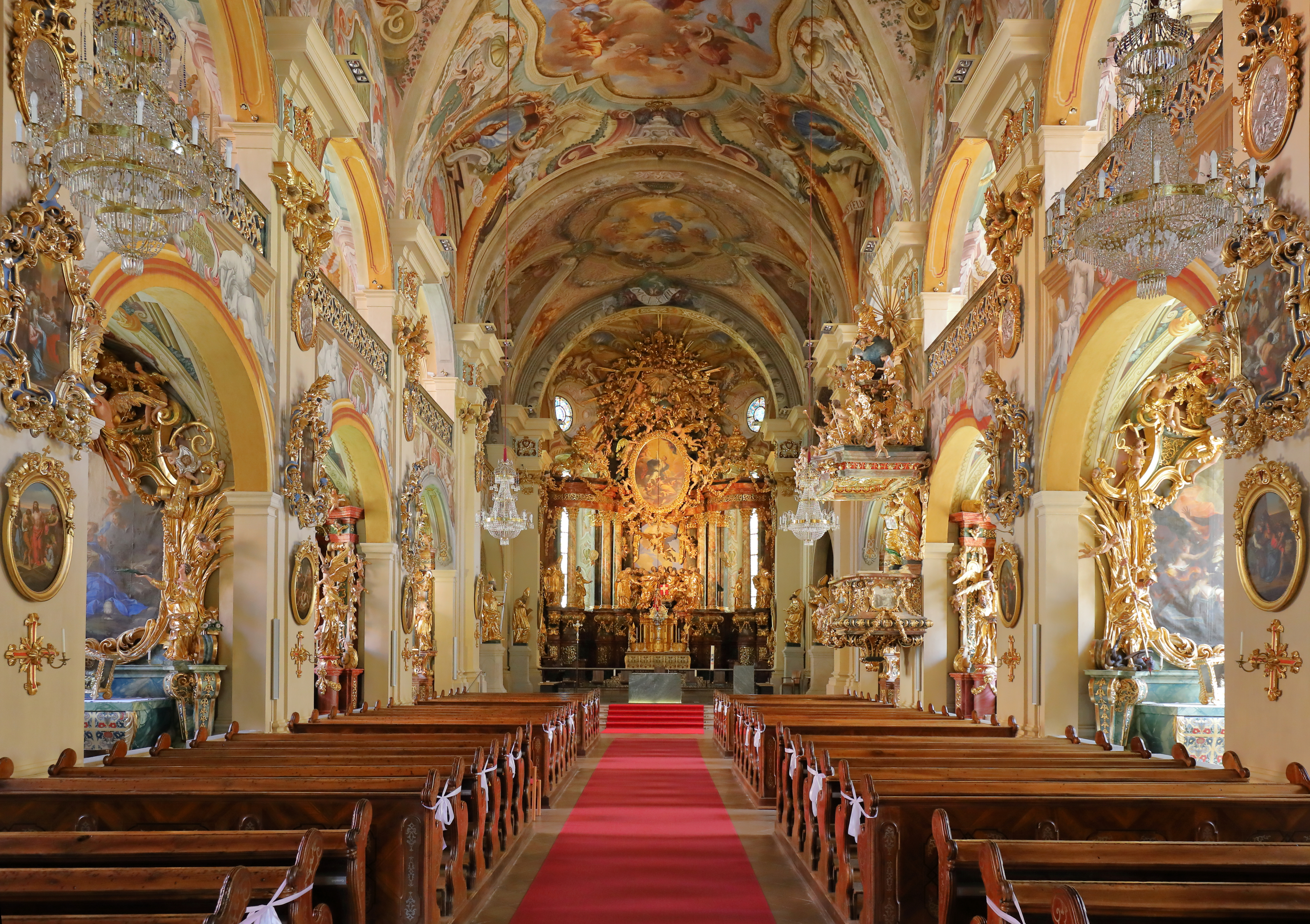
Elaborate baroque nave

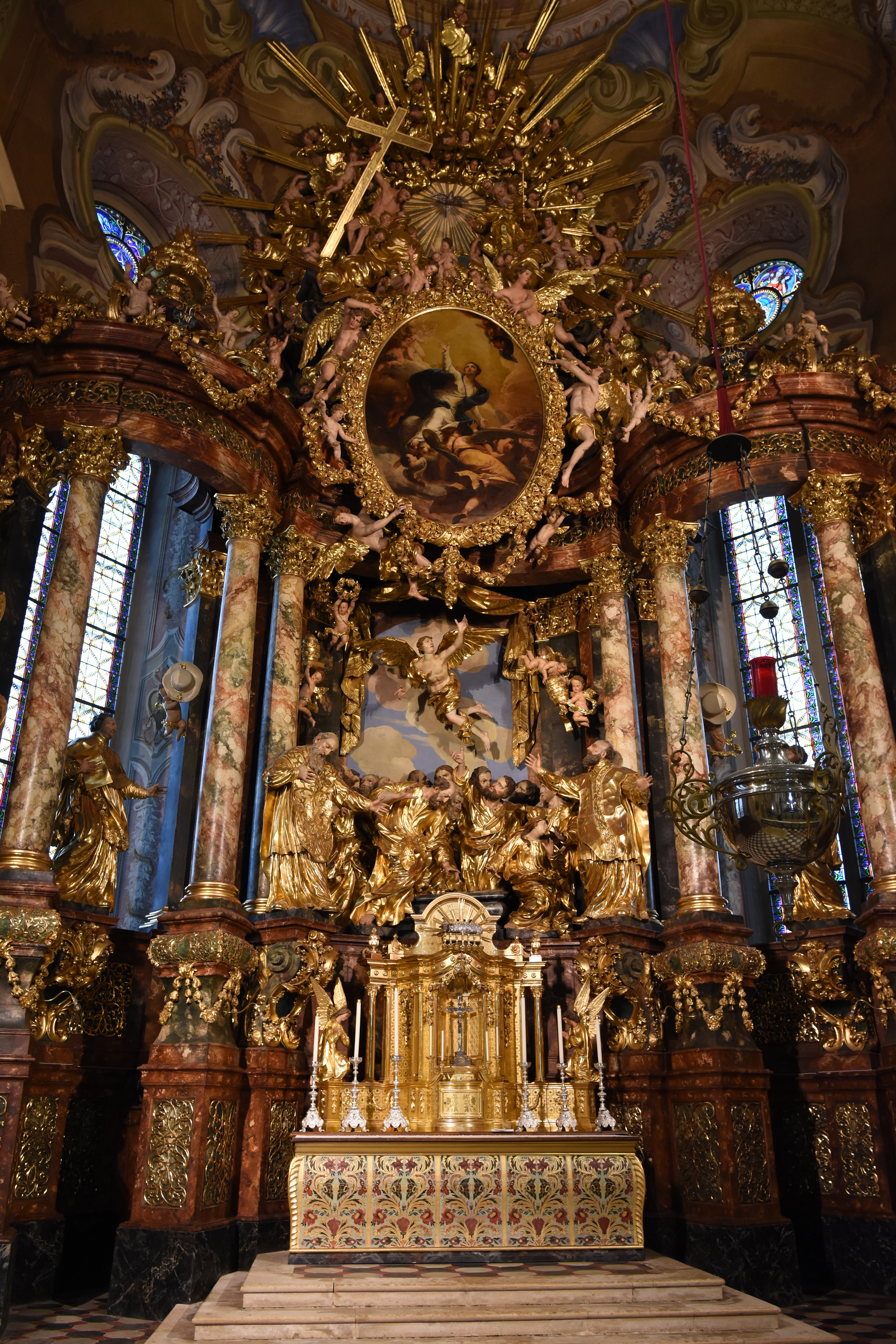
High altar

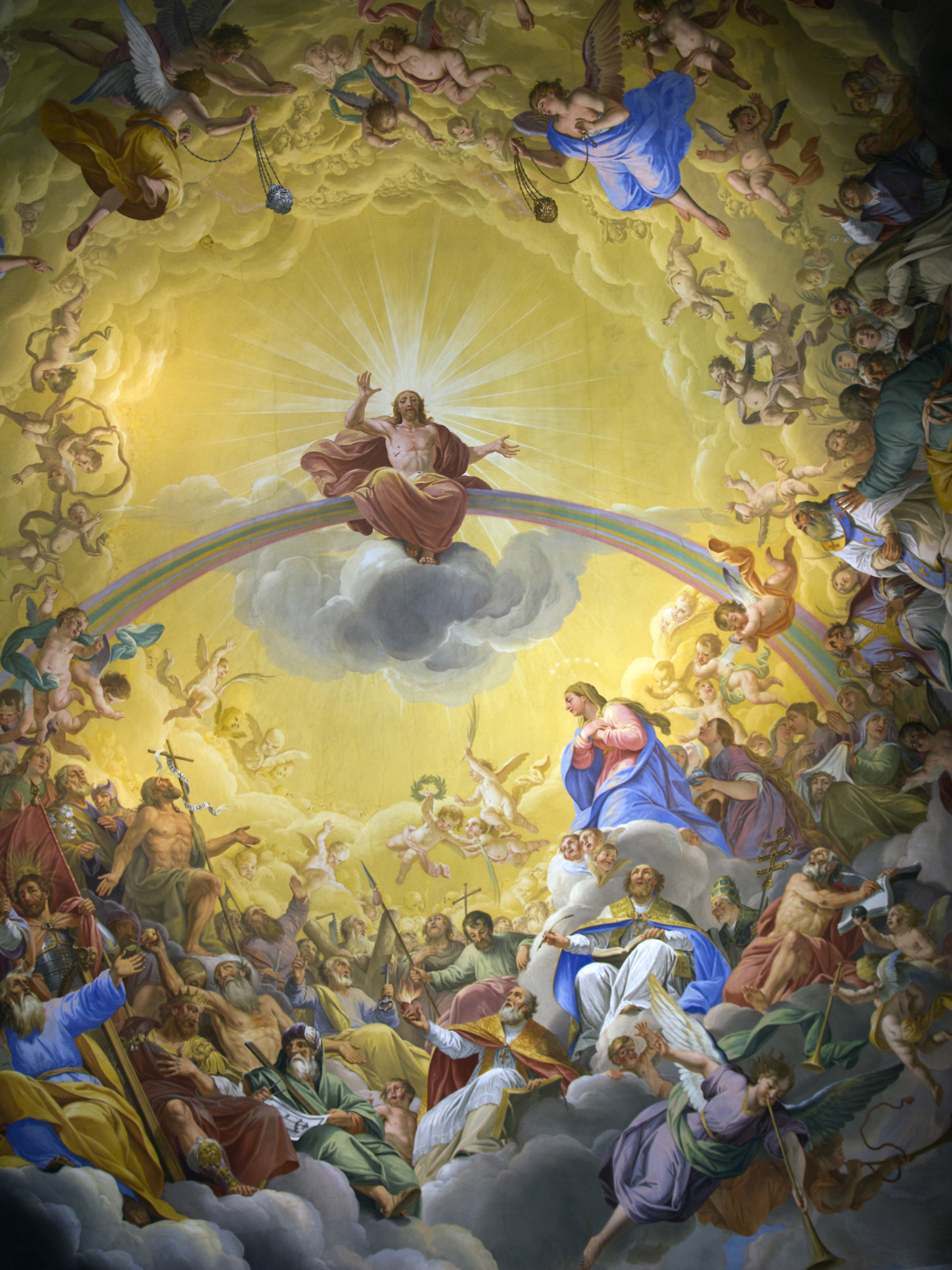
Sacristy ceiling fresco

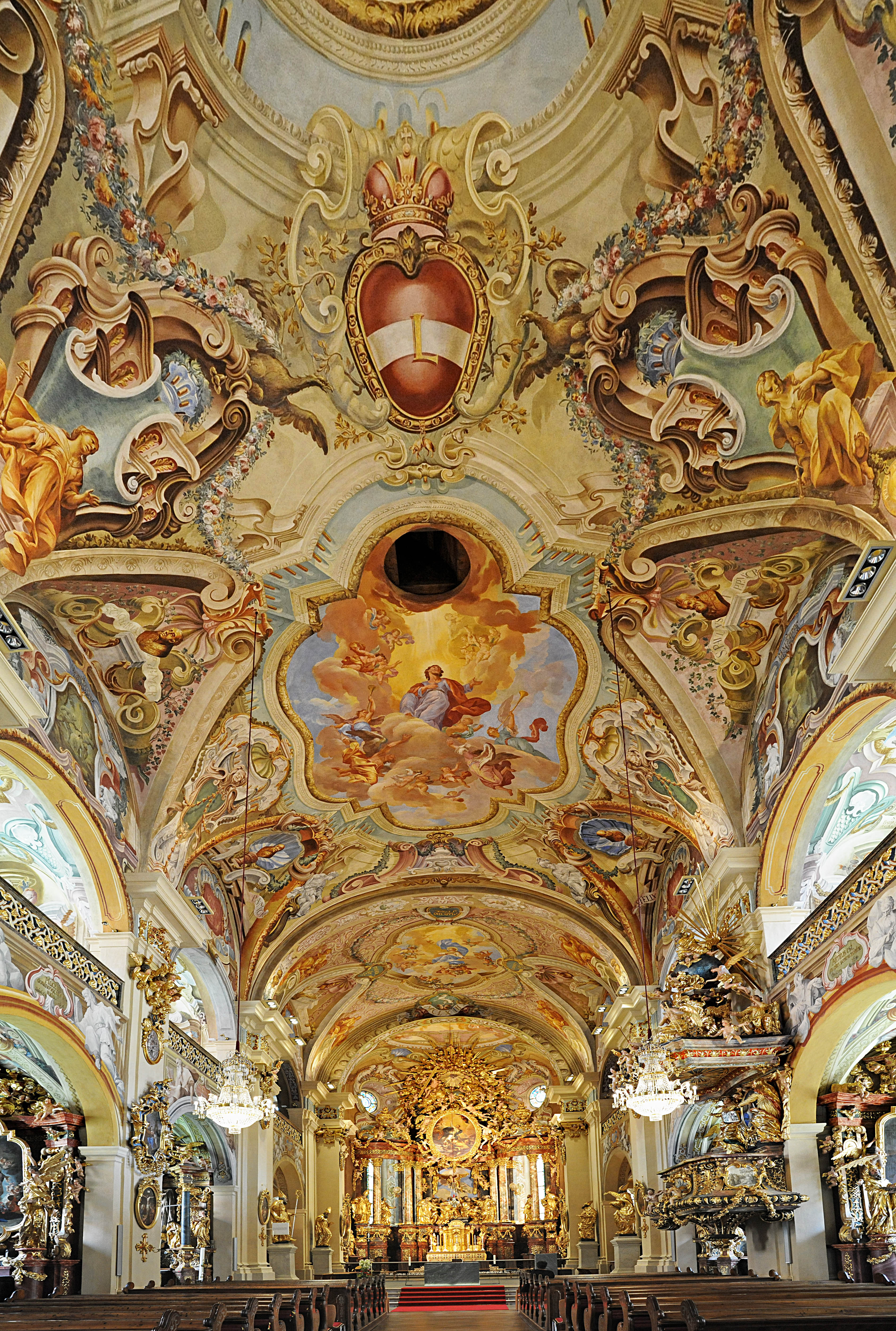
Nave and pulpit (right)
Library
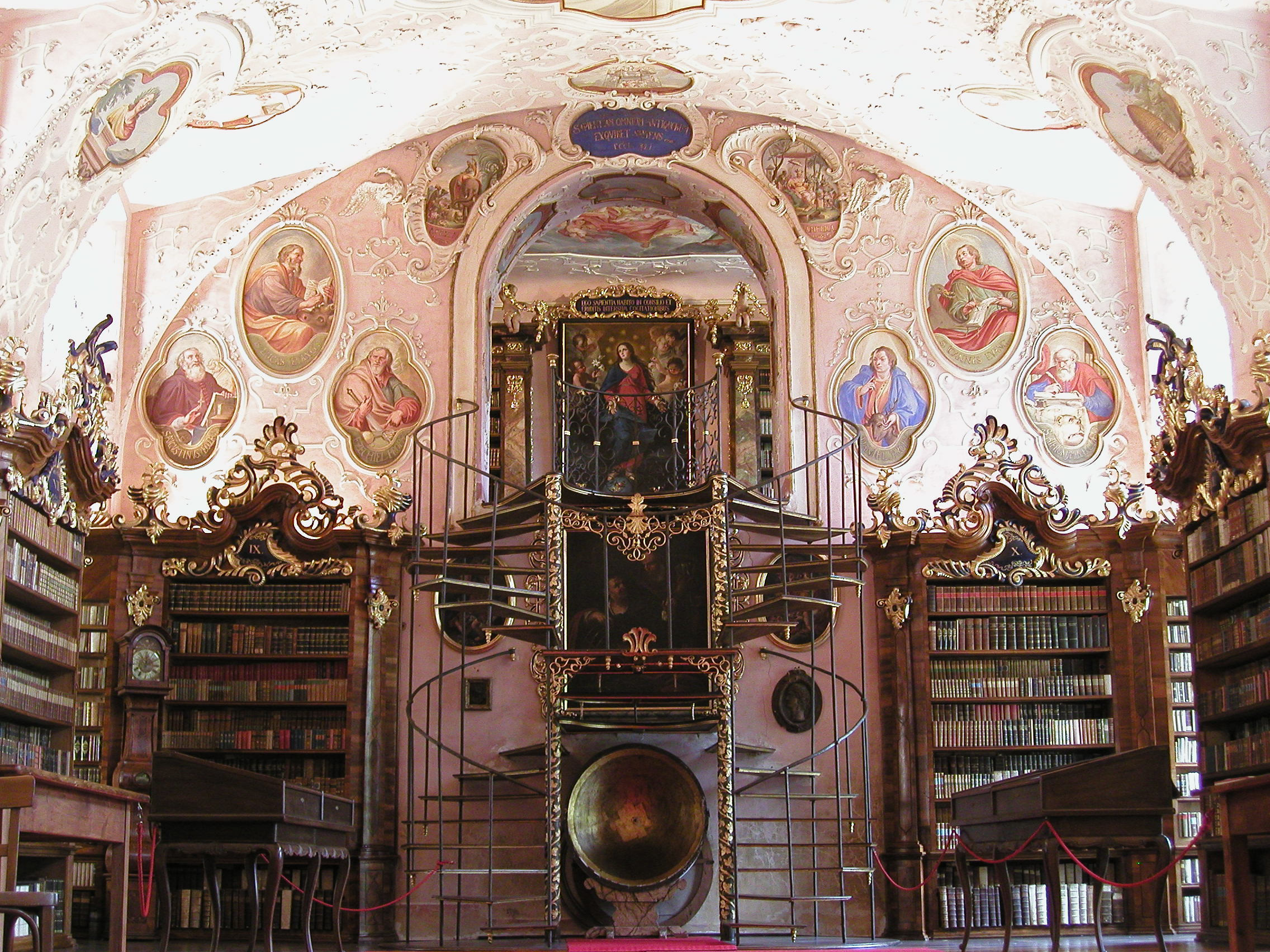
Library hall

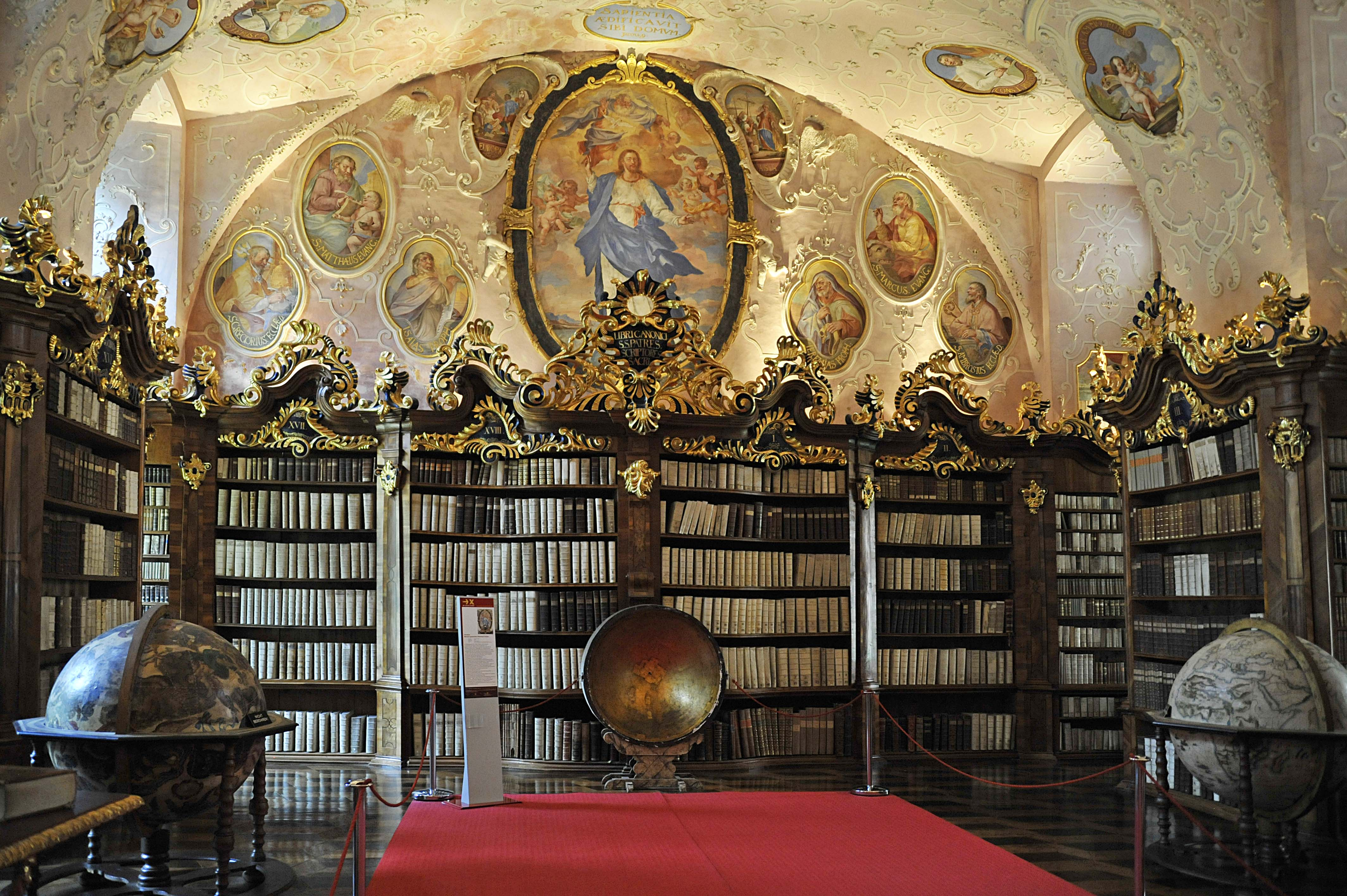
Library bookshelf
