= Barrie Wilson =

Canadian historian

Barrie A. Wilson is a Canadian Professor Emeritus and Senior Scholar, Humanities and Religious Studies, York University, Toronto, where he has taught since 1974. A historian of religion, he specializes in movements in early Christianity. Throughout the 1990s he was Chair of Religious Studies at Atkinson College, York University. From 1969 to 1974 he taught Ancient Philosophy and Logic at Saint Louis University in St. Louis, Missouri. His book How Jesus Became Christian was longtlisted for the Cundill Prize and won the Tanenbaum Prize for History at the Canadian Jewish Book Awards.

== Background ==
Wilson was born in Montreal on November 19, 1940 and attended Bishop's University, Lennoxville, Quebec, majoring in Philosophy and Psychology, graduating with a B.A. magna cum laude. He completed an M.A. in Philosophy at Columbia University, New York City, and took courses at Union Theological Seminary and the Episcopal Church's General Theological Seminary, both in New York City. He earned a degree in Biblical Studies (S.T.B.) from the Anglican Church's Trinity College, University of Toronto.

Wilson completed his Ph.D. in Philosophy of Religion and Near Eastern Studies at the University of Toronto in 1975. His dissertation was on biblical hermeneutics, the logic of textual interpretation, and evidence for making sense of texts.

== Books ==
- Searching for the Messiah, (NY: Pegasus/Simon&Schuster, 2020). An historical investigation of the concept of the messiah from biblical sources, through the Psalms of Solomon, Jesus and Paul into modern times, ISBN 978-1-64313-450-5.
- Paul vs James: The Battle that Shaped Christianity and Changed the World (NY: Createspace, 2018). A novel which dramatizes the conflict between the Jesus Movement of James and the Christ Movement of Paul. ISBN 9781723534669.
- (with Simcha Jacobovici) The Lost Gospel (NY: Pegasus; Toronto: HarperCollins, 2014). A decoding of Joseph and Aseneth using the Syriac method of typology. The book contains a new translation of Joseph and Aseneth based on the oldest existing Syriac manuscript found in the British Library as well as translations of two covering letters that point the way to an interpretation of the text. ISBN 978-1-60598-610-4.
- How Jesus Became Christian (NY: St. Martin’s Press; Toronto: Random House, 2008). An historical investigation into the process whereby a Jewish human teacher becomes the dying-rising savior god-human. ISBN 978-0-679-31493-6.
- Hermeneutical Studies (NY: Mellon, 1991). Essays on Sophocles, Plato, Bar-Daisan and Dilthey. ISBN 0-88946-370-0.
- About Interpretation: An Anthology of Readings in Hermeneutics from Plato to Dilthey (NY/Munich: Peter Lang, 1989). Original sources for Allegorical, Reformation, Romanticist and Historicist Hermeneutics. ISBN 0-8204-0688-0.
- To the Point (Boston: Christopher Publishing, 1989). Communication tips for making effective presentations.
- Anatomy of Argument (Lanham, MD: University Press, 1980, 2nd edition 1986). A logic textbook. ISBN 0-8191-1211-9.
- Interpretation, Meta-Interpretation and Oedipus Tyrannus (Berkeley: The Center for Hermeneutical Studies, 1980). Proceedings of the 39th Colloquy, May 26, 1980, at the Graduate Theological Union and University of California, Berkeley. ISBN 0-89242-038-3.

Articles: available through researchgate.net (Barrie Wilson).

- "What's a Messiah?
- "The Lost Gospel: The Manuscript Tradition" summarizes what is known of this writing along with an interpretive scan.

== Film studies ==
Wilson is a contributing member of the Toronto Psychoanalysis and Film Study Group which explores the psychological interpretation of films. Copies of his papers on films can be found at researchgate.net.

- Rules of the Game - film - analysis
- Annie Hall – movie – analysis
- Changing Lanes – film – analysis
- The Debt
- Big Fish - movie – analysis
- The Decline of the American Empire - movie - analysis
- Nelly et M. Arnaud – film – analysis
- Brothers – film – analysis
- Dreamchild – movie – analysis – Alice in Wonderland
- Run Lola Run – movie – analysis
- The Rif Lover – movie – analysis

== Documentaries: on-camera expert ==
- Vision TV series The Naked Archeologist. Secrets of Christianity episode #4 (2009).
- National Geographic UK series Ancient X-files, episode on Mary Magdalene and Gnostic Christianity (2012).
- Discovery Science, The Last Days of Jesus (2014).
