= Drunken Silenus (Ribera) =

1626 painting by Jusepe de Ribera

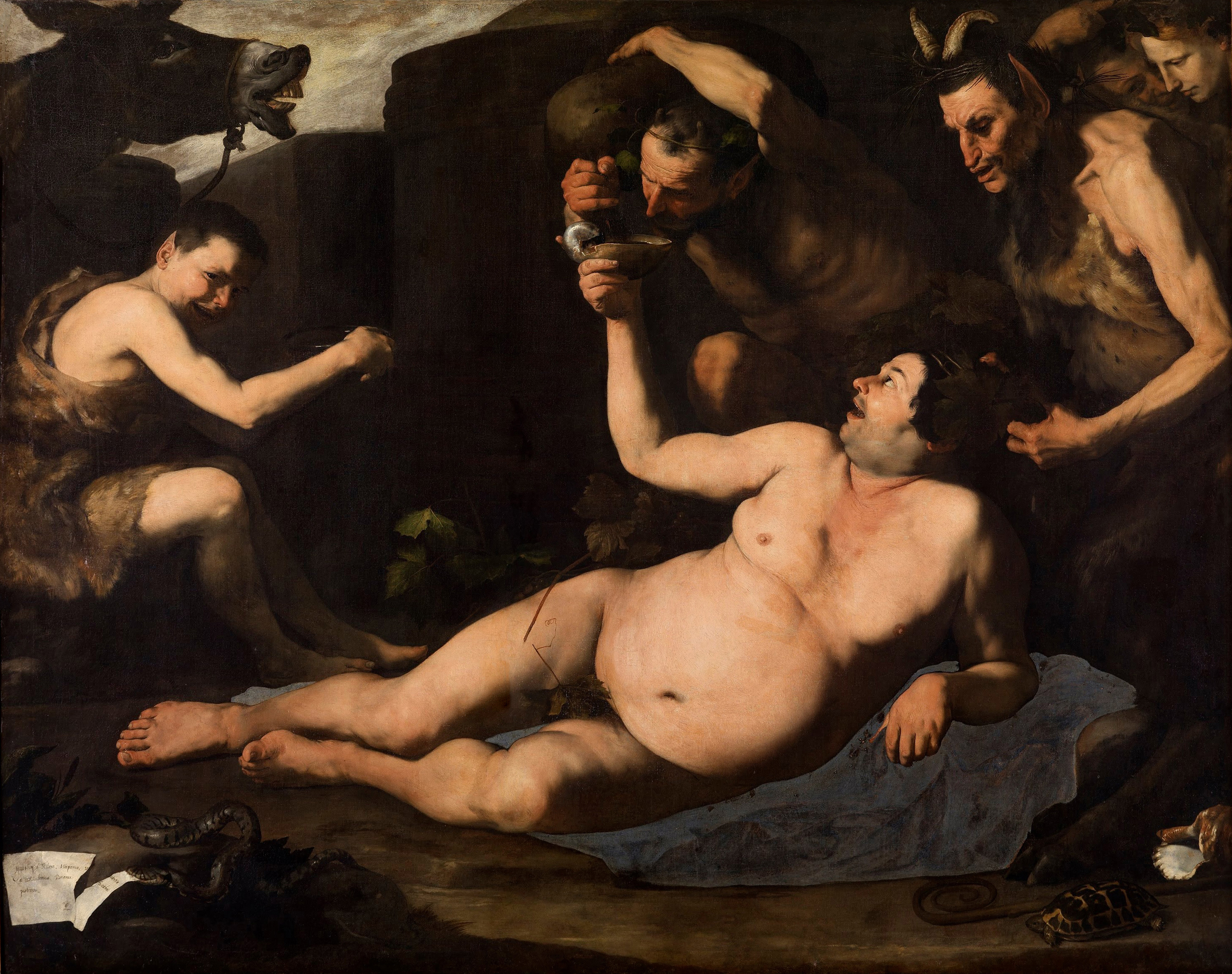
Drunken Silenus

Drunken Silenus is a painting by Jusepe de Ribera, produced in 1626 in Naples and now in the Museo di Capodimonte in Naples.

The central figure is Silenus, lying on a cloth and holding his wine cup as the figure behind him refills it from a wineskin. To the right is Pan, crowning Silenus with vines and surrounded by a shell (the symbol announcing his death) and a turtle (symbol of laziness). At the bottom left is a snake symbolising wisdom.

== History ==
Its first recorded owner was the Flemish merchant Gaspar Roomer, but he did not commission the work, since he first acquired it several years after the artist's death. At the end of the 18th century, it entered the collection of the House of Bourbon-Two Sicilies as part of their possessions in Naples, bringing it to the Capodimonte.
