= Polium =

Ancient town on the Greek island of Lesbos

Polium or Polion (Ancient Greek: Πόλιον) was a town of ancient Lesbos.

The site of Polium is unlocated, but may be near modern Poli; no evidence of an ancient settlement has been uncovered.
