= Cult of Dionysus =

Cult in Ancient Greece

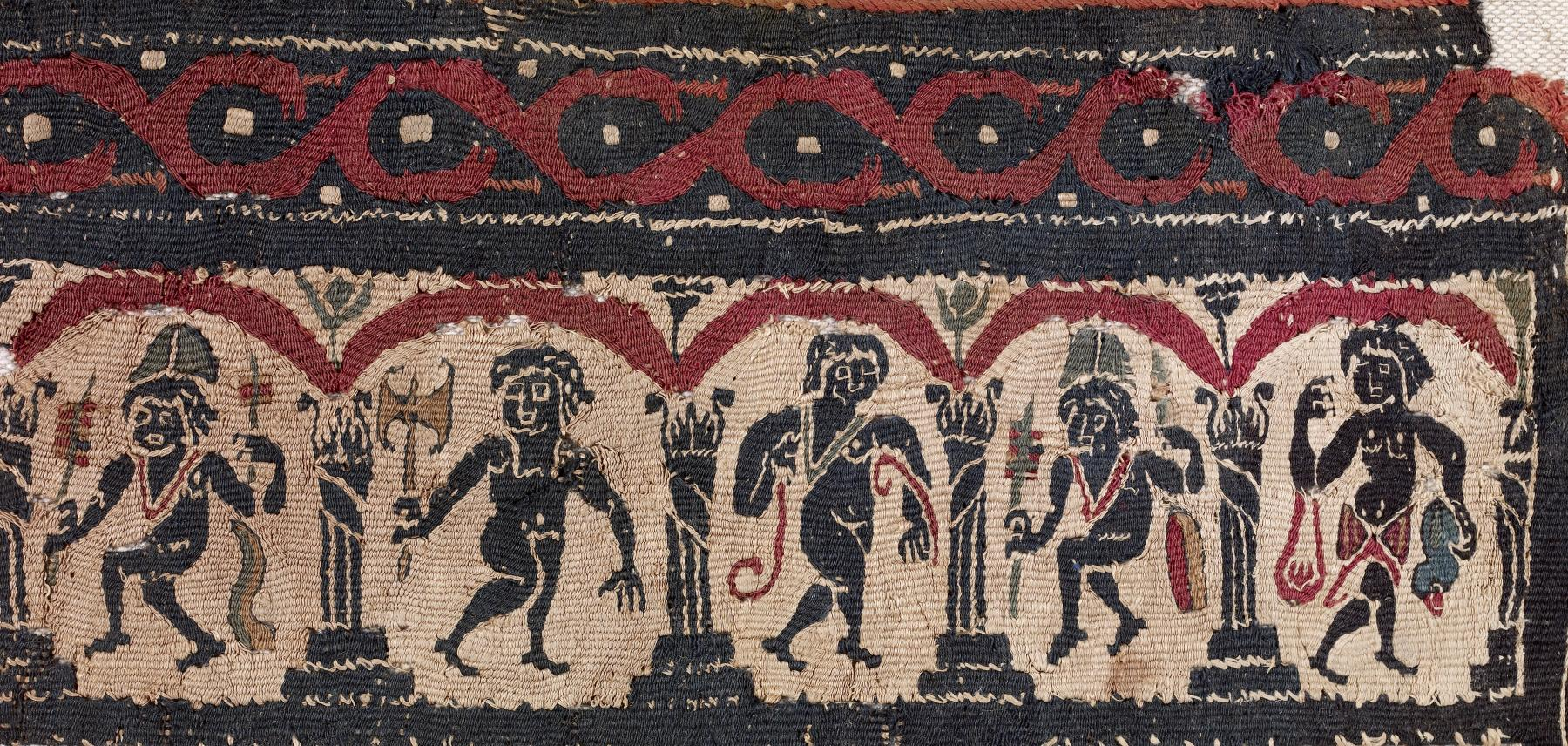
Egyptian garment panel featuring Dionysiac themes, 5th century. The popularity of the cult of Dionysus, introduced to Egypt by the early Ptolemaic rulers in the 3rd century BC, continued into early Byzantine times (4th-7th century),

The cult of Dionysus consisted of a wide range of Greek and later Roman religious practices associated with Dionysus, ecstasy, theatre, vegetation, and certain form of salvation after death. Ecstatic rituals performed by people involved in the cult included the orgeia, a forest rite involving ecstatic dance during the night. The Dionysia and Lenaia festivals in Athens were dedicated to Dionysus, as well as the phallic processions. These processions often featured villagers parading through the streets with large phallic representations. The cult of Dionysus traces back to at least Mycenaean Greece, since his name is found on Mycenean Linear B tablets as 𐀇𐀺𐀝𐀰 (di-wo-nu-so). However, many view Thrace and Phrygia as the birthplace of Dionysus, and therefore the concepts and rites attributed to his worship. Dionysian worship was especially fervent in Thrace and parts of Greece that were previously inhabited by Thracians, such as Phocis and Boeotia. The Bacchic gold tablets are among the most important sources for Dionysian mystery beliefs concerning death, deification, and afterlife. The Dionysian Mysteries were related to Orphism, and may have influenced Gnosticism. Modern scholarship treats these mysteries not as a single, organized "Dionysian" religion but rather as local variants of a broader Greek and Roman phenomenon that varied over place and time.

The cult was strongly associated with satyrs, centaurs, and sileni, and its characteristic symbols were the bull, the serpent, tigers/leopards, ivy, and wine. One reason for Dionysus's association with the sileni is that Silenus, a chief figure among them, was said to have taught Dionysus the art of wine-making. Dionysus himself is often shown riding a leopard, wearing a leopard skin, or in a chariot drawn by panthers, and is also recognized by his iconic thyrsus. Besides the grapevine and its clashing alter-ego, the poisonous ivy plant, both sacred to him, the fig was another one of his accredited symbols. Additionally, the pinecone that topped his thyrsus linked him to Cybele, an Anatolian goddess. The Dionysian effect the god had on women also bores a resemblance to Krishna, an Indian god who enchanted female gopis with music to venture into the forest in the night.

== History of practice ==
The exact historical basis of the Cult of Dionysus and Dionysian rites still remains unknown, however there are some speculations. Dionysus may have traveled throughout Greece as an orpheotelestae, or a traveling healer, curing illnesses through ecstatic dance. Dionysian worship in Rome was also said to have arrived via a traveling magician-priest. Dionysus's ecstatic dances and drumming of the tympana, a common drum depicted on vases with maenads, is then speculated to have been the origin of the cult's own rituals.

Others speculate that the Dionysian cults sprung from the wishes of Dionysus himself. During the Hellenistic period, an inscription from Magnesia on the Meander details of the image of Dionysus being found in a plane tree. The people interpreted this image as Dionysus himself seeking the establishment of his worship there. Maenads were brought from Thebes to participate in the orgeia and the Bacchic thiasoi in Magnesia in the fifth century. Some believe that Dionysus exists through these rites and can be evoked from dance, explaining his instigations for cult worship.

Cult rituals generally included ecstatic dancing to the point of exhaustion, music, and night-wandering in nature. Delphi, Magnesia, and Miletus were cities that held activity for the Cult of Dionysus during the first through the third centuries. During the Hellenistic period, Dionysiac worshipers were often organized into three different groups named Semele, Agave, Ino and Atonoe. These groups met periodically to dance and participate in rituals together in reverence of Dionysus.There is an association with tragedies that occurred during these celebrations, often times they are misconstrued or associated with beliefs that these tragedies were actually part of practicing rituals.

== Women in the cult of Dionysus ==
Women played an especially prominent role in the cult of Dionysus, in part due to the Dionysian effect he had on women. Homer's Hymn 1 references Dionysus as "gynaimanes", or "he who drives women insane." Known as maenads, women followers of Dionysus performed ecstatic forms of worship, including participation in the orgeia. Human maenadic dancers engaging in ecstatic worship were popularly depicted on Greek vases.

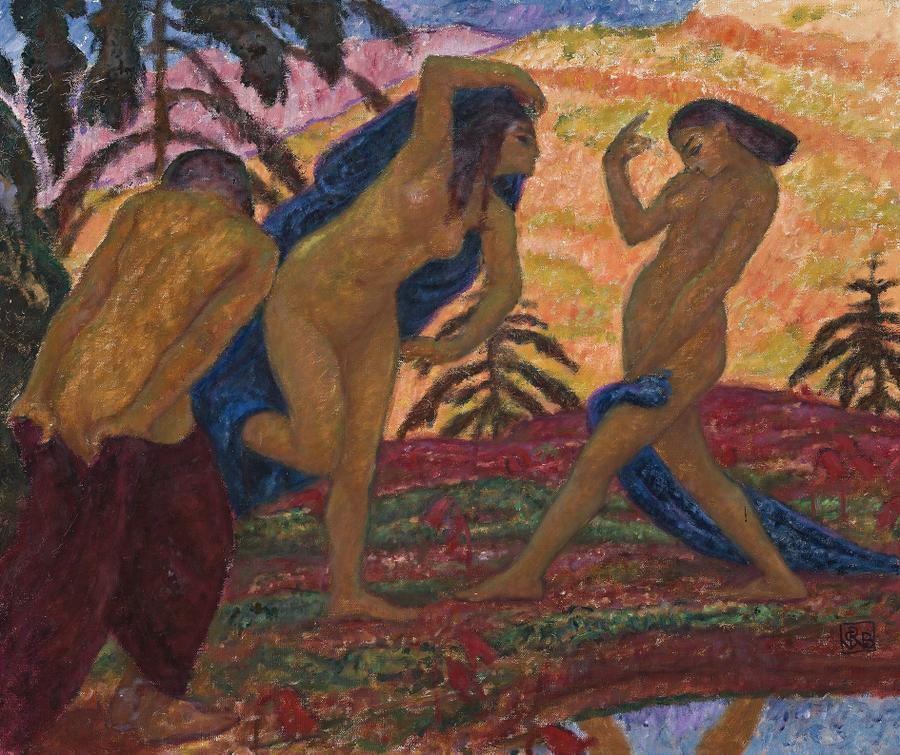
Maenads by Rupert Bunny, oil on canvas, c. 1913-1921. Lucien Lefebvre-Foinet, Paris.

The oreibaia, or winter dance, was a popular form of maenadic Dionysian worship that was scheduled biannually in winter. Oftentimes, for these forms of worship, Maenads would dress in fawnskin and ivy wreaths. Maenads would run into the woods and, imbued with enthousiasmos, call for Dionysus or yell "ewoi", a Bacchic cry of frenzy. Hair tossing, dance, and thyrsos wielding was also a common occurrence during the oreibaia. In the second century, Pausanias referenced maenads who submitted Mount Parnassus, and Plutarch's De primo frigido discussed maenads worshiping and getting caught in a snowstorm, illustrating that maenads were not mythological figures in Greek culture, but rather real women.

Violence was a prevalent facet of maenadic frenzies. Maenads would catch, kill, and eat wild animals, from snakes to bears and wolves, in the forest during their ecstatic trances, engaging in sparagmos and omophagia. The Bacchae by Euripides also references the violent tendencies of maenadic worship, in which maenads mistook King Pentheus for a lion and killed him. The maenads usually killed their prey by hand, but depictions of weapons, such as a sword, have been portrayed on pyxes.

The appeal the Cult of Dionysus had towards women specifically also captures the reversal of the socio-biological realm of ancient Greece. Women could not participate in much of public life, including drinking and hunting, and were forced towards domestic obligations centering the home and children. Participating in ecstatic and violent rites suggests the subversion of the established division of labor and the occupation of a dominant role, a notion common in other festivals like the Roman Saturnalia.

== Bacchic Gold Tablets ==
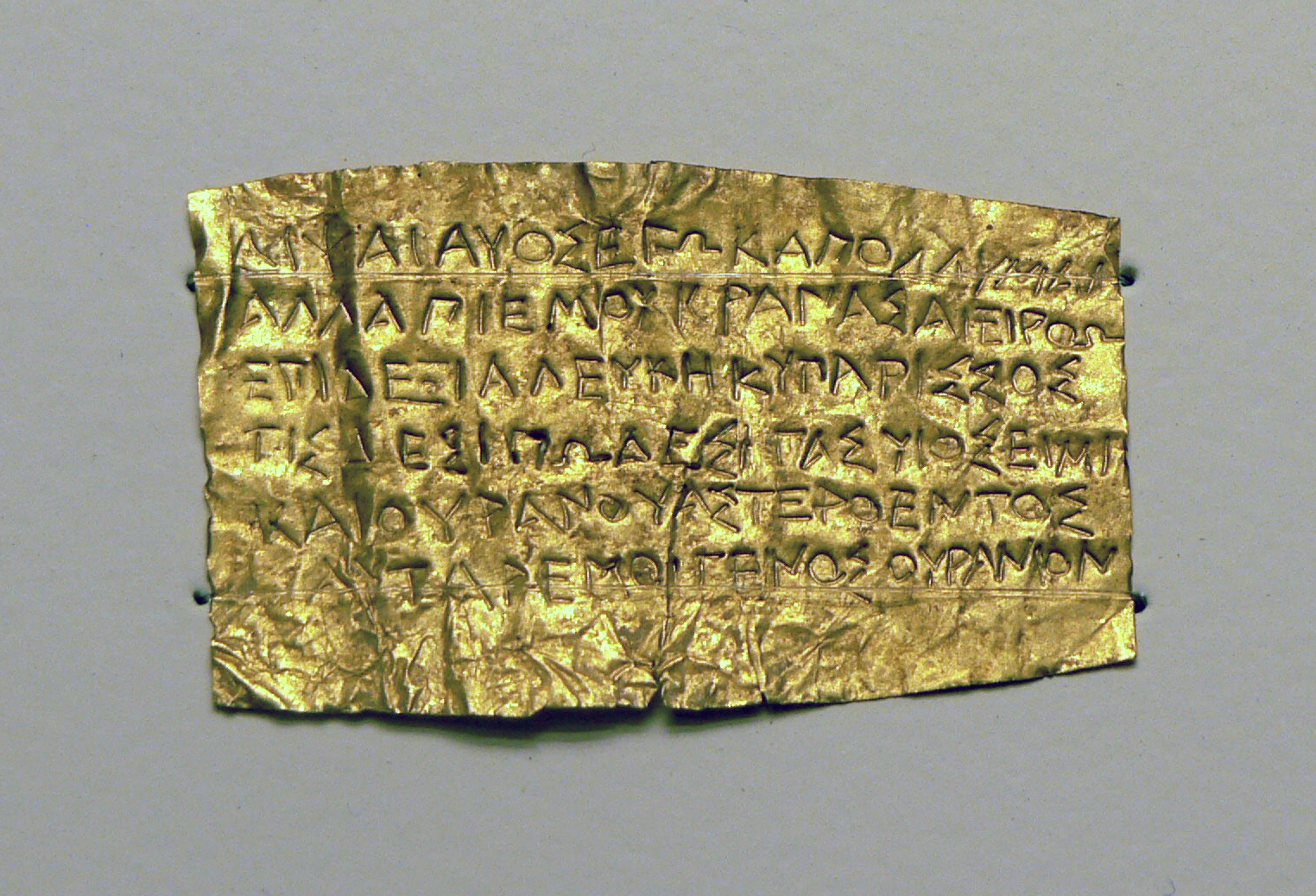
Example of an especially well preserved Bacchic gold tablet

The Bacchic Gold Tablets, also known as Totenpass (German for passport for the death), are one of the most important archaeological sources about the Dionysian Mysteries and Dionysian eschatology. The only few centimeters tall sheets of gold were found in graves all over Greece and Italy. Some contain Greek inscriptions with instructions for the afterlife: avoiding a particular spring with a white cypress, instead looking for the "Lake of Mnemosyne" (Lake of Memory), and answering a ritual challenge with the formula "I am a child of Earth and starry Heaven" (an adaption of Hesiod, Theogony 105-106).

Older scholarship pointed towards water divination within the cult. As newer evidence, especially from the gold tablets, has shown, water imagery played a central role during the initiation ceremony when the initiate is instructed about thirst, springs, and the water of Mnemosyne.

Modern scholarships sees these tablets mainly as texts relating to the initiation into the mysteries with the afterlife being a secondary concern. Christian Zgoll proposed a so called Doppelspiegelszenario ("double-mirror-scenario") to explain their function: During the initiation, the initiates experience a ritual death that anticipates their own death. Thereby, they also reflect on their later arrival in the underworld, which the initiation prepares them for. In this sense, ritual death during the ceremony and physical death form a inseparable unity that can hardly be distinguished from one another.

The gold tablets also suggest an apotheosis of the initiates during the initiation ceremony, i.e. during their own lifetime. When arriving in the underworld after their death, the gold tablets function as a divine passport by proofing that the person has been initiated, has therefore already become a god, and this allowed to enter the underworld.

== Bacchanalia ==
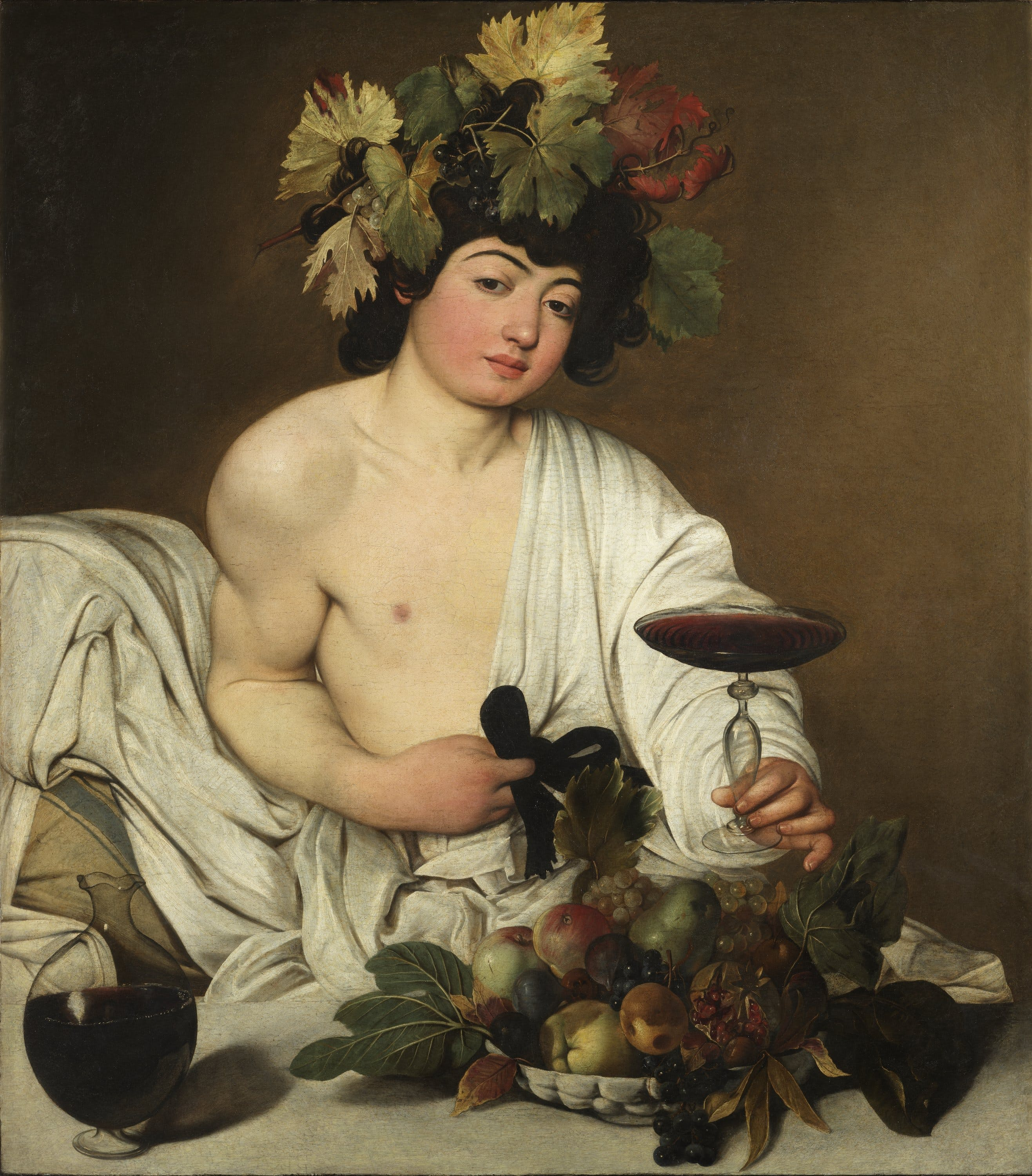
Bacchus by Caravaggio

Introduced into Rome (c. 200 BC) from Magna Graecia or by way of Greek-influenced Etruria, the bacchanalia were held in secret and attended by women only, in the grove of Simila, near the Aventine Hill, on 16 and 17 March. According to Livy, admission to the rites were subsequently extended to men, and celebrations took place five times per month. The notoriety of these festivals, where many kinds of crimes and political conspiracies were supposed to be planned, led in 186 BC to a decree of the Senate—the so-called Senatus consultum de Bacchanalibus, inscribed on a bronze tablet discovered in Calabria (1640), now at Vienna—by which the Bacchanalia were prohibited throughout all Italy except in certain special cases which must be approved specifically by the Senate. In spite of the severe punishment inflicted on those found in violation of this decree, the Bacchanalia were not stamped out, at any rate in the south of Italy, for a very long time.

Dionysus is equated with both Bacchus and Liber (also Liber Pater). Liber ("the free one") was a god of fertility, wine, and growth, married to Libera. His festival was the Liberalia, celebrated on 17 March, but in some myths the festival was also held on 5 March.

== Appellations ==
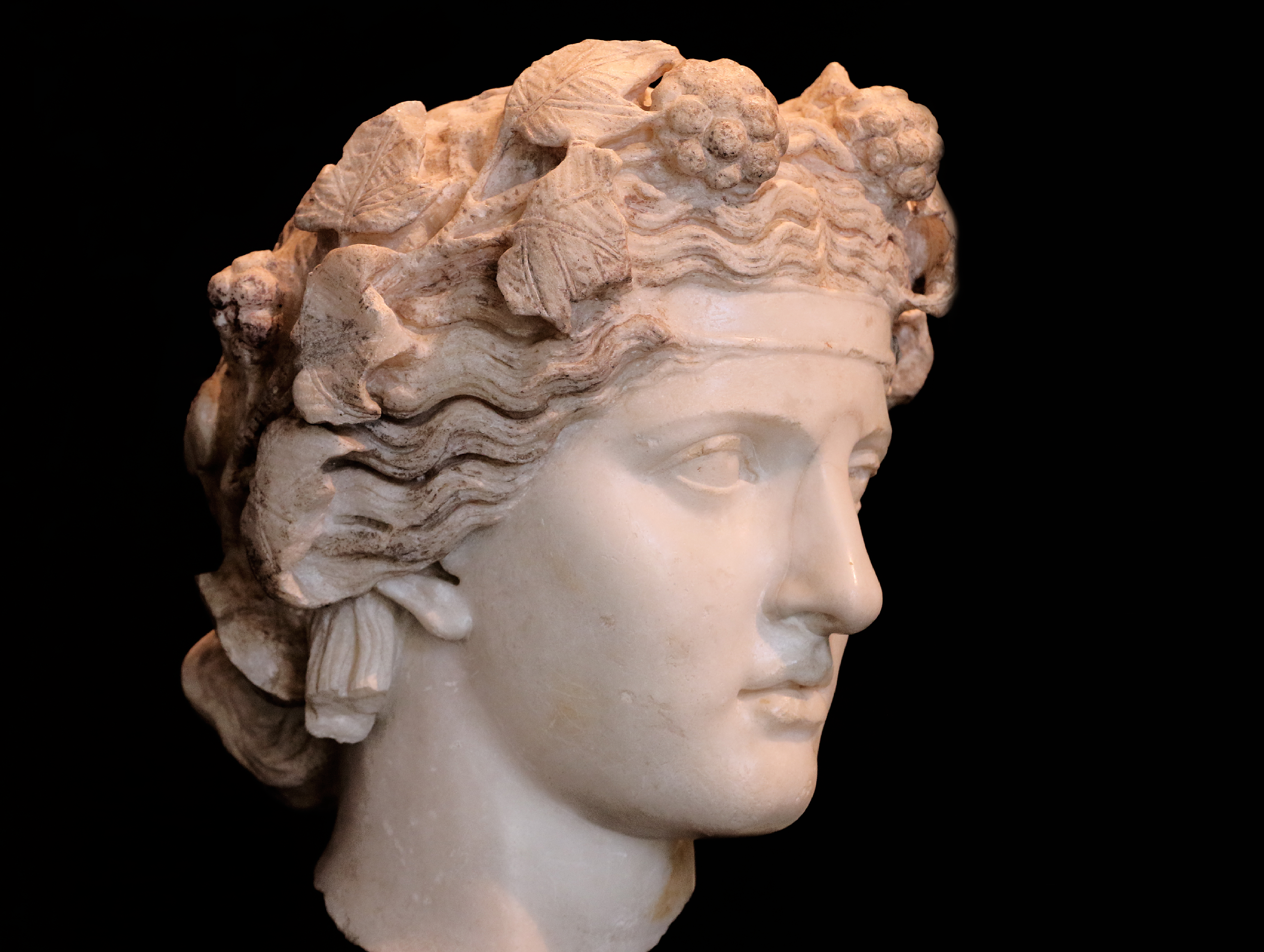
Marble head of Dionysus in the Capitoline Museums, Rome

Dionysus sometimes has the epithet Acratophorus', by which he was designated as the giver of unmixed wine, and worshiped at Phigaleia in Arcadia. In Sicyon he was worshiped by the name Acroreites. As Bacchus, he carried the Latin epithet Adoneus', "Ruler". Aegobolus, "goat killer", was the name under which he was worshiped at Potniae in Boeotia. As Aesymnetes ("ruler" or "lord") he was worshiped at Aroë and Patrae in Achaea. Another epithet was Bromios, "the thunderer" or "he of the loud shout". As Dendrites, "he of the trees", he is a powerful fertility god. Dithyrambos is sometimes used to refer to him or to solemn songs sung to him at festivals; the name refers to his premature birth. Eleutherios ("the liberator") was an epithet for both Dionysus and Eros. Other forms of the god as regarding fertility include the epithet in Samos and Lesbos Enorches' ("with balls" or perhaps "in the testicles" in reference to Zeus' sewing the infant Dionysus into his thigh, i.e., his testicles). Evius is an epithet of his used prominently in Euripides' play, The Bacchae. Iacchus (Greek: Ἴακχος), possibly an epithet of Dionysus, is associated with the Eleusinian Mysteries; in Eleusis, he is known as a son of Zeus and Demeter. The name Iacchus may come from iacchus, a hymn sung in honor of him. With the epithet Liknites ("he of the winnowing fan"), he is a fertility god connected with the mystery religions. A winnowing fan was similar to a shovel and was used to separate the chaff from the grain. In addition, Dionysus is known as Lyaeus ("he who unties") as a god of relaxation and freedom from worry and as Oeneus, he is the god of the wine press.

In the Greek pantheon, Dionysus (along with Zeus) absorbs the role of Sabazios, a Phrygian deity. In the Roman pantheon, Sabazius became an alternate name for Bacchus.

== See also ==
- Apollonian and Dionysian
- The Birth of Tragedy by Friedrich Nietzsche
- Cult (religious practice)
- Theatre of Dionysus
- Thiasus, or thiasos
- Totenpass
