= The First Death =

2017 book by Dimitris Lyacos

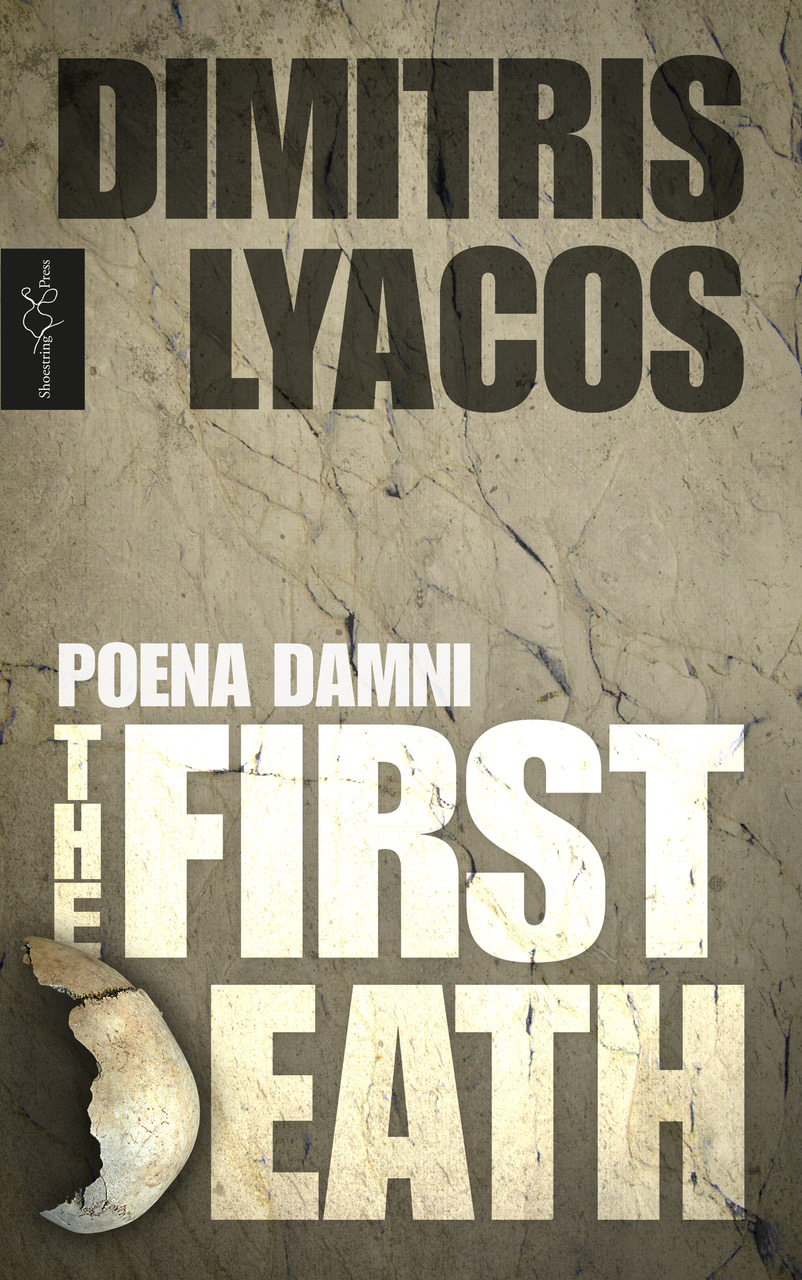
- Cover of Dimitris Lyacos' The First Death, Second Edition, 2017
- Author: Dimitris Lyacos
- Original title: Ο πρώτος θάνατος
- Translator: Shorsha Sullivan
- Cover artist: Fritz Unegg
- Language: English
- Series: Poena Damni
- Genre: Poetry, postmodernism
- Publisher: Shoestring Press
- Publication date: 26 October 2017 (Second Revised Edition)
- Publication place: United Kingdom
- Media type: Print (Paperback & Paperback)
- Pages: 37 pages (first edition), 58 pages (second edition)
- ISBN: 978-1-899549-42-9
- OCLC: 45991303
- Preceded by: With the people from the bridge (2014)

The First Death is a book by Dimitris Lyacos. It is the third part of the Poena Damni trilogy. The book is a fictional rendering of a poem that is translated by an inmate with the use of a dictionary he finds available in the library of the prison he is detained. The translated poem tells the story of a marooned man on a desert island in a sequence of fourteen sections, recounting his relentless struggle for survival as well as his physical and mental disintegration. The work alludes simultaneously to a modern Philoctetes, an inverted version of Crusoe as well as the myth of the dismemberment of Dionysus. The dense and nightmarish imagery of the poem, replete with sensations of hallucination, delirium, synesthesia, and putrefaction has drawn comparisons to Lautreamont, Trakl and Beckett. Despite being first in the publication history of the Poena Damni trilogy, The First Death is chronologically last in the narrative sequence.

== Title ==
The title of the book refers to the gradual disintegration of the character's body as it falls prey to the surrounding inimical natural elements. The contradistinction between first and second death in the Apocalypse of St. John the Divine, is used to allude to the gradual decomposition of the body as a state of a reduction of its life-force and in view of its ensuing annihilation. Insofar as the first death does not bring about a complete mental disintegration it is not considered as "real death",. In a spiritual sense, the protagonist of the book subsists in a "hellish" kind of existence, presumably awaiting the occurrence of future redemption or definitive extinction. The title also refers to the occurrence of the first death in the context of the biblical history of the human race, namely the murder of Abel by his brother Cain.

== Synopsis ==
The First Death recounts the ordeal of an unnamed male protagonist stranded on a desert-like island. The book starts with a description of his mutilated body which grinds against the rocks. The poem expands on the theme of his continuing degradation, physical and mental, as even the mechanisms of memory are dislocated. Yet, the bond between person and body ensures life still persists, and, "at that point without substance/ where the world collides and takes off", the mechanical instincts of the cosmos rumble into action and sling this irreducible substance again into space - prompting, perhaps, a future regeneration.

== Themes ==
Ὅτι ἕκαστον φύλλον μόνον ἅπαξ πίπτει, οὕτως εἶπεν αὐτοῖς. Ἀεί μὲν τὰ φύλλα ἄλλη ἄλλυδις πίπτει, ἀλλ᾿ ἕκαστον ἅπαξ. Καὶ ἀπέθανεν ἕκαστον ἅπαξ ὅτι ἤδη ἀφῆκεν τὸ ἴδιον ξύλον, ἀλλ᾿ ὅπου πίπτει, ζήσεται πάλιν ὁμοῦ μετὰ τῶν ὑποκάτωθεν ζῴων. Καὶ οἱ ἐρχόμενοι καὶ ὁρῶντες αὐτὰ πεσόντα καὶ γινώσκοντες ὅτι ὁ νόμος τοῦ ξύλου ἐξέβαλε αὐτά, ὄψονται πῶς ὁ σκώληξ ἐσθίει αὐτὰ. Καὶ πῶς ζωήν τῷ σκώληκι ἐνδίδωσιν ἕκαστον ἵνα μήποτε αυτόν τελευτήσειν καὶ ὁ πυρετός ἐν τῆ κοιλίη αὐτοῦ μή σβήσεται εἰς τὸν αἰῶνα. Και ἡ διαίρεσις αὔτη τοῦ ξύλου ὁ πρῶτος ᾠνόμασται θάνατος, δι’ ὅν ἠρωτήκατε.

That each leaf falls only once, thus he said to them. The leaves always fall, one here and one there, but each only falls once. And each has only died once because it has already left its own wood, but wherever it falls, it will live again together with the creatures below. And those coming and seeing them fallen and knowing that the law of the wood has cast them, will see how the worm eats them. And how it gives life to the worm so that it will never perish, and the fever in its belly will not be extinguished forever. And this parting is called the first death of the tree, about which you have asked.

(Book epigraph by author in Koine Greek. English translation by Andrew Barrett)

— From "THE FIRST DEATH", English Edition, Shoestring Press/Kindle 2024

The First Death, recounts the result of its protagonist's voyaging towards annihilation. His body and mind are on the verge of dissolution while fighting for continuance and survival. Portrayed as a victim of nature and presumably expelled by society, he is represented both as a castaway and an abortion, dying before he has ever achieved birth. The work describes his purgatorial-like torture, mapping a desert and rocky island as the locus of his suffering. His exclusion and solitude allude to Greek Tragedy, most importantly Philoctetes, while images of mutilation and dismemberment relate to ancient Greek sacrifices and rituals. The myth of the dismemberment of Dionysus by the Titans is also hinted at as the text resorts to the concept of sparagmos (Ancient Greek: σπαραγμός, from σπαράσσω sparasso, "tear, rend, pull to pieces"), an act of rending, tearing apart, or mangling, Other oblique classical references are equally embedded in the text, such as the presence of Orpheus, also suggested by images of dismemberment. In its role as the epilogue of the Poena Damni trilogy the poem also witnesses the aftermath of the impending violence of the first volume, Z213: Exit.

== Style ==
The First Death
- Cover of Dimitris Lyacos' The First Death, First English Edition, 2000
- Cover artist: Fritz Unegg
- Publication date: 23 March 2000
- ISBN: 978-1-899549-42-9
- OCLC: 45991303

The original Greek employs an unconventional modern idiom, accommodating a variety of ancient Greek words and integrating them into the flow of the text. Contrary to the previous book of the trilogy, With the People from the Bridge, which makes use of predominantly bare, simple sentences in a theatrical context, The First Death is written in a dense, highly tropical style. Each poem section unravels a multi-layered concatenation of images in order to illustrate the unremitting torment of the book's protagonist. Often, the weightiness of surreal abstraction lends a metaphysical atmosphere to the work, thus investing the ordeal undergone by the protagonist with a sublime-like quality as, he, in spite of the world, continues his struggle to the limits of his powers. Images of spoiled, rotten, maimed nature, artifacts, architecture and especially bodies are described in such rich detail they take on an eerie, atrocious, paradoxical glory. The book brings to bear aspects of the Homeric clarity of description which are in their turn coupled with fierce and expressionistic depictions of a nightmarish setting. In its aligning disparate literary traditions in order to intensely depict the clash of the human subject in the midst of a hostile world, The First Death, is considered as one of the most violent works of Greek literature in modern times.

== Critical reception and publication history ==
Being the first to have been published among the three installments of the Poena Damni trilogy The First Death has received a number of reviews that span over two decades. Some critics underline the work's close connection with Ancient Greek Literature due to its hybrid linguistic character and its allusions to Tragedy" while others see a strong connection with current events. Critic Toti O'Brien notes: "As I read The First Death, I imagine the carpet of corpses lining the Mediterranean. Strata and strata of limbs—now bones—piled up during recent decades, all belonging to shiploads of migrants seeking escape through Europe. I can’t help connecting the poetry under my eyes with this precise scenery. The most powerful, the most disturbing imagery Lyacos paints makes sense in this context where it naturally embeds itself."

The book was originally published in Greek in 1996 and has been translated in English, German, Spanish, Portuguese, French and Italian. The first English edition appeared in 2000 and went out of print in 2005. A second revised English edition was launched as an e-book in the spring of 2017 and subsequently appeared in print in the autumn of the same year. The new edition contains extended Translator's Notes explaining the Ancient Greek references to the original Greek text.
