= Metatheatre =

Aspects of a play that draw attention to its nature as a play

Metatheatre, and the closely related term metadrama, describes the aspects of a play that draw attention to its nature as drama or theatre, or to the circumstances of its performance. "Breaking the Fourth Wall" is an example of a metatheatrical device.

Metatheatrical devices may include: direct address to the audience (especially in soliloquies, asides, prologues, and epilogues); expression of an awareness of the presence of the audience (whether they are addressed directly or not); an acknowledgement of the fact that the people performing are actors (and not actually the characters they are playing); an element whose meaning depends on the difference between the represented time and place of the drama (the fictional world) and the time and place of its theatrical presentation (the reality of the theatre event); plays-within-plays (or masques, spectacles, or other forms of performance within the drama); references to acting, theatre, dramatic writing, spectatorship, and the frequently employed metaphor according to which "all the world's a stage" (Theatrum mundi); scenes involving eavesdropping or other situations in which one or several characters observe another or others, such that the former relate to the behaviour of the latter as if it were a staged performance for their benefit.

The words "metatheatre" and "metadrama" combine theatre or drama with the Greek prefix "meta—", which implies "a level beyond" the subject that it qualifies.

== In the history of drama ==
=== Greece and Rome ===
Metatheatricality has been a dimension of drama ever since its invention in the theatre of classical Greece 2,500 years ago. One major purpose of this metatheatricality was to keep the spectators away from utter involvement or belief in the development of the plot presented. Ancient Greek comedy in particular made frequent use of it (though examples can also be found in tragedy, including in The Bacchae by Euripides).

=== Early modern theatre ===
In early modern English theatre, characters often adopt a downstage position in close contact with the audience and comment on the actions of others sarcastically or critically, while the other actors assume the convention that the first remains unheard and unseen while so doing. Following the work of Robert Weimann and others, theatre studies uses the terms locus and platea (relating to "location" and "place", borrowed from medieval theatre) to describe this performance effect—the locus is localised within the drama such that its characters are absorbed in its fiction and unaware of the presence of the audience; while the platea is a neutral space in close contact with the spectators that exists on the boundary between the fiction and the audience's reality.

When the defeated Cleopatra, performed by a boy player in act five of Shakespeare's Antony and Cleopatra, fears her humiliation in the theatres of Rome in plays staged to ridicule her, she says: "And I shall see some squeaking Cleopatra boy my greatness in the posture of a whore". While the actor is not necessarily engaged at this point in the direct address of the audience, the reality of the male performer beneath the female character is openly, and comically, acknowledged (qualifying in important ways, supported further in the scene and the play as a whole, the tragic act of her imminent suicide). Metatheatricality of this kind is found in most plays of that period.

In Hamlet, there occurs the following exchange between Hamlet and Polonius:

Hamlet: ... My lord, you played once i'th'university, you say.
Polonius: That I did my lord, and was accounted a good actor.
Hamlet: And what did you enact?
Polonius: I did enact Julius Caesar. I was killed i'th'Capitol. Brutus killed me.
Hamlet: It was a brute part of him to kill so capital a calf there.

— Hamlet (3.2.95–100).

If the only significance of this exchange lay in its reference to characters within another play, it might be called a metadramatic (or "intertextual") moment. Within its original performance context, however, there is a more specific, metatheatrical reference. Historians assume that Hamlet and Polonius were played by the same actors who had played the roles mentioned in Shakespeare's Julius Caesar a year or two earlier on the same stage. Apart from the dramatic linking of the character of Hamlet with the murderer Brutus (foreshadowing Hamlet's murder of Polonius later in the play), the audience's awareness of the identities of the actors and their previous roles is comically referenced.

Another example from Shakespeare is in Act V of A Midsummer Night's Dream. The rude mechanicals present Pyramus and Thisbe to the Athenian nobles, who openly comment on the performance as it unfolds. The storyline of Pyramus and Thisbe closely parallels Lysander and Hermia's story, which suggests theirs could have ended tragically. Then Puck, who has broken the fourth wall multiple times to share asides with the audience, steps outside of the action of the play to address the audience directly. His final speech bids farewell to the audience members and asks them to think of the play as only a dream if it has offended. This relates to the way Bottom rationalizes his experience in the forest as only a dream. These metatheatrical layers suggest that we all inhabit the roles of observer and observed on the worldly stage and that it's possible to dismiss strange experiences as dreams.

=== Modern theatre ===
==== The fourth wall ====
In the modern era, the rise of realism and naturalism led to the development of a performance convention known as the "fourth wall". The metaphor suggests a relationship to the mise-en-scène behind a proscenium arch. When a scene is set indoors and three of the walls of its room are presented onstage, the "fourth" of them would run along the line dividing the room from the auditorium (technically called the "proscenium"). The fourth wall is thus an invisible, imagined wall that separates the actors from the audience. While the audience can see through this "wall", the convention assumes, the actors act as if they cannot. In this sense, the "fourth wall" is a convention of acting, rather than of set design. It can be created regardless of the presence of any actual walls in the set, or the physical arrangement of the theatre building or performance space, or the actors' distance from or proximity to the audience.

"Breaking the fourth wall" is any instance in which this performance convention, having been adopted more generally in the drama, is disregarded. The temporary suspension of the convention in this way draws attention to its use in the rest of the performance. This act of drawing attention to a play's performance conventions is metatheatrical.

A similar effect of metareference is achieved when the performance convention of avoiding direct contact with the camera, generally used by actors in a television drama or film, is temporarily suspended. The phrase "breaking the fourth wall" is used to describe such effects in those media.

==== Modernism ====
Instances of metatheatricality other than "breaking the fourth wall" occur in plays by many of the realist playwrights, including Henrik Ibsen, August Strindberg, and Anton Chekhov. As with modernism more generally, metareference in the form of metatheatricality comes to play a far more central and significant role in the modernist theatre, particularly in the work of Bertolt Brecht, Vsevolod Meyerhold, Luigi Pirandello, Thornton Wilder, Samuel Beckett, and many others.

In more recent times, With the People from the Bridge by Dimitris Lyacos employs metatheatrical techniques whereby a makeshift play centered on the vampire legend is viewed from the angle of a spectator who records in his diary the setting and preparations as well as the sequence of the actors' soliloquies interspersed with personal notes on the development of the performance.

In contemporary China, avant-garde theatre director Meng Jinghui (b. 1964) employs metatheatre as his central trope. In particular, “play within the play” was used in many of his early works (such as Waiting for Godot and The Balcony) in the aftermath of the Tiananmen protests to express disillusionment with revolutionary ideals and disbelief in politics. “Role playing within the role” was used in many of his later plays (such as I Love XXX and Rhinoceros in Love) to enact the split identities of young people in contemporary China who are caught between idealism from China’s socialist past and cynicism in its capitalist present.

== Origin of the term ==
The term "metatheatre" was coined by Lionel Abel in 1963 and has since entered common critical usage. Abel described metatheatre as reflecting comedy and tragedy, at the same time, where the audience can laugh at the protagonist while feeling empathetic simultaneously. Abel relates it to the character of Don Quixote, whom he considers to be the prototypical, metatheatrical, self-referring character. Don Quixote looks for situations of which he wants to be a part, not waiting for life to oblige, but replacing reality with imagination when the world is lacking in his desires. The character is aware of his own theatricality. Khalil-Ghibran's Meta-Theater cross breeds the term with the Greek prefix as before, but the poetic undertones covey the familiar feeling of awareness.

== See also ==
- Aside
- Epilogue
- Fourth wall
- Frame story
- Induction
- Meta-
- Meta-discussion
- Meta-joke
- Meta-reference
- Metafiction
- Metafilm
- Metaknowledge
- Metalanguage
- Prologue
- Self-reference
- Show-within-a-show
- Story-within-a-story
- Title of show
- Verfremdungseffekt

== Sources ==
- Abel, Lionel. 1963. Metatheatre: A New View of Dramatic Form. Hill and Wang.
- Abel, Lionel. 2003 [posthumous]. Tragedy and Metatheatre: Essays on Dramatic Form. New York: Holmes y Meier Publishers.
- Angus, Bill. 2016. Metadrama and the Informer in Shakespeare and Jonson. Edinburgh University Press.
- Angus, Bill. 2018. Intelligence and Metadrama in the Early Modern Theatre. Edinburgh University Press.
- Edwards, Philip. 1985. Introduction. Hamlet, Prince of Denmark by William Shakespeare. The New Cambridge Shakespeare Ser. Cambridge: Cambridge University Press. 1-71. ISBN 0-521-29366-9.
- Hornby, Richard. 1986. Drama, Metadrama, and Perception. London: Cranbury; Mississauga: Associated University Press.
- Weimann, Robert. 1978. Shakespeare and the Popular Tradition in the Theater: Studies in the Social Dimension of Dramatic Form and Function. Baltimore and London: The Johns Hopkins University Press. ISBN 0-8018-3506-2.
