= Over the horizon =

Over the horizon or Over the Horizon may refer to:

== Arts and media ==
- "Over the Horizon Radar" (song), on the album Geogaddi by Boards of Canada
- "Over the Horizon" (song), the trademark sound for Samsung smartphones since the Galaxy S II
- Over the Horizon, a short story by Lee Yeongdo
- Over the Horizon, a documentary film that won a Rob Stewart Award

== Other uses ==
- Over-the-horizon radar, a radar capable of detecting targets beyond the horizon
- Over the Horizon Action, a voter registration and education program of the Rockbridge Network
- Cutter Boat – Over the Horizon (Over The Horizon boat), a boat in service with the US Coast Guard

== See also ==
- OTH (disambiguation)
