= With the People from the Bridge =

2014 book by Dimitris Lyacos

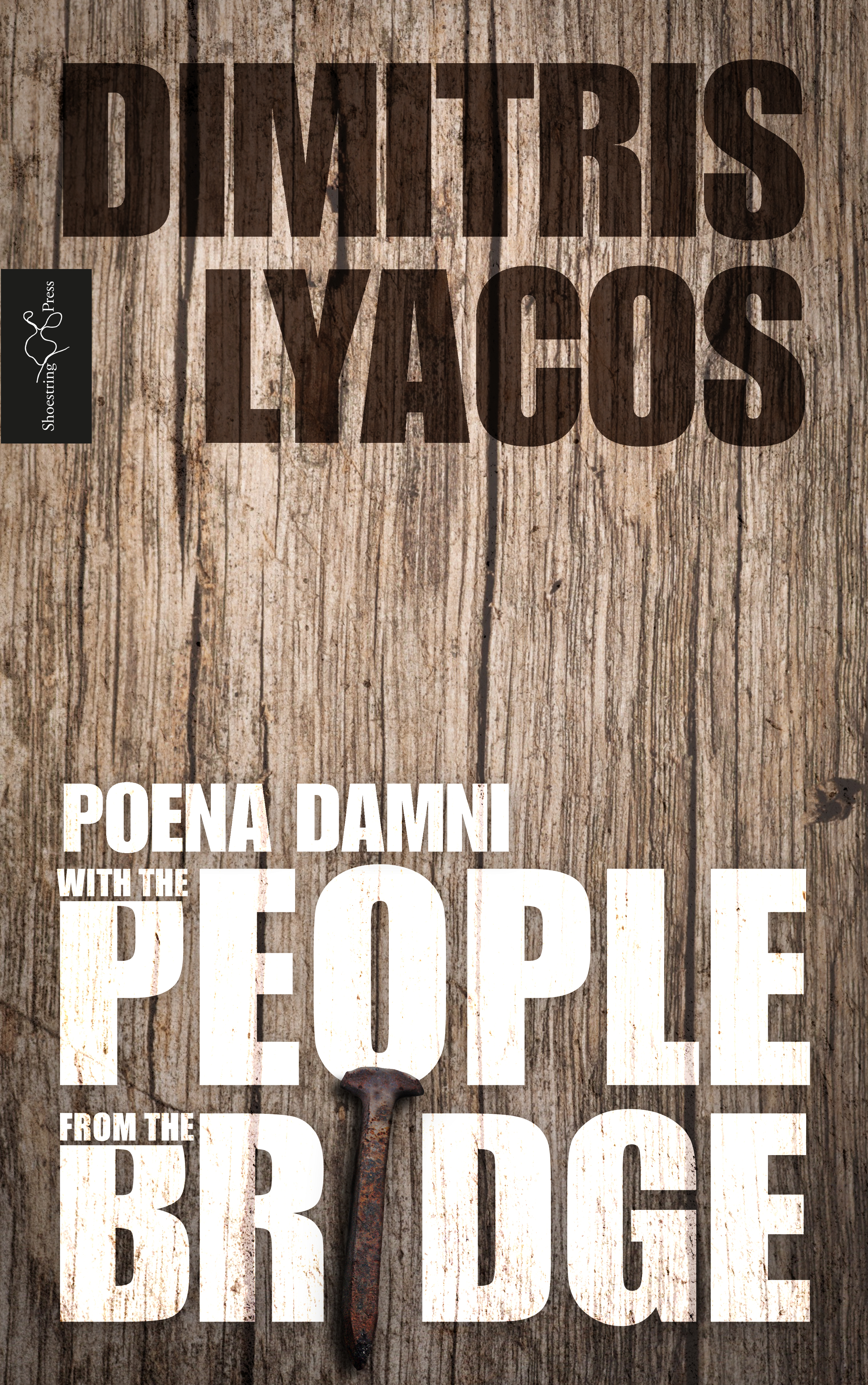
- English edition
- Author: Dimitris Lyacos
- Original title: Με τους ανθρώπους από τη γέφυρα
- Translator: Shorsha Sullivan
- Cover artist: Dominik Ziller
- Language: Greek
- Series: Poena Damni
- Genre: Postmodernism
- Publisher: Shoestring Press
- Publication date: 2014
- Publication place: Greece
- English publication date: 2014
- Pages: 101
- ISBN: 9781910323915
- Preceded by: Z213: Exit
- Followed by: The First Death

With the People from the Bridge (Greek: Με τους ανθρώπους από τη γέφυρα) is the second part of the Poena Damni trilogy by Greek author Dimitris Lyacos. The book deals with the theme of loss and the return of the dead in the context of Christian teleology. The text is encased in a post-theatrical ritual drama form, drawing on various philosophical and literary sources as well as ancient and modern Greek folklore. The plot-line centers around an Orpheus-like journey of the protagonist LG who joins his deceased companion in the grave and is subsequently led by her to a liminal realm ahead of the imminent Resurrection Day. The work has been categorized by critics to belong to both the Modernist and the Post-Modernist tradition, while at the same time bearing strong affinities to a variety of canonical texts, among others Homer, Dante, Kafka, Joyce and Beckett.

== Synopsis ==
With the People from the Bridge follows the main line of narrative of Z213: Exit, the first book of the Poena Damni trilogy. The work opens with a first-person account of the narrator of Z213: Exit, who recounts his arrival at a derelict train station named Nichtovo in search of a place where he has been told, an improvised performance is being staged by, what appears to be, a band of social outcasts. The narrator joins the few members of the audience present and goes on to record in his journal the setting as well as the events taking place "on stage" as the performance is about to begin. A group of four women in the role of a Chorus and three other protagonists (LG, NCTV, Narrator) are making their final preparations in front of a dilapidated car among machine parts and the noise of a generator. As the lights "on stage" are lowered the performance sets off with the Chorus's opening monologue followed in turn by the sequence of recitations of the other characters. The story unfolds during the timeline of a calendar day dedicated to the dead, a kind of All Souls' Day or Saturday of Souls. The plot line originates in the Bible incident (Mark, 5:9), according to which the Gerasene demoniac begs Jesus to spare him from his torments. In the play enacted, LG assumes and expands on the role of the demoniac, recounting his past condition and describing how he has ended up taking residence in a cemetery. In a kind of simultaneous narration, LG recounts how he has opened the grave of his deceased companion (NCTV), prompted by voices he has been hearing. He enters, finds her body inside and feels compelled to stay with her, eventually making the realization that she is gradually coming back to life. Meanwhile, the Chorus is making preparations in anticipation of the yearly visit of their deceased kin, and LG and NCTV eventually join them after having broken off from a crowd of revenants aroused on the occasion of the Soul Saturday. As the day comes to an end, LG and NCTV leave and become again part of the crowd they had broken off from. Despite trying to hold on to each other they are finally absorbed in an indefinite collective of souls moving ahead and crossing "the bridge between the worlds" as a Christian-like resurrection appears on the horizon. The book concludes with the epilogue of the on-stage(internal) Narrator recounting the process by which a mob gathered in a cemetery unearths two bodies, ritually "killing" the female by driving a stake in her chest, in a manner akin to handling vampires in the Slavonic tradition. A final narrative twist is offered by the presence of a tabloid clipping which delivers the reader back to a stark and gruesome everyday reality.

== Genre ==
With the people from the bridge is a cross-genre work combining prose narrative with dramatic monologues written in poetry form. Verse soliloquies, elements of staging and ritual as well as choral incantations and simple descriptions are combined to create a polyvalent text approximating both poetry and drama. The makeshift stage as well as the presence of actors give the text its dramatic character, while action and setting, filtered through a spectator's perspective, bring to prominence the dimension of storytelling. Self-reflexive theatricality achieved through a clear-cut presentation of the division of spectators, actors, and director and accounted for by the unifying voice of an external narrator leads to the work's classification as a piece of metatheatre. Further, and due to a constellation of elements including broken narrative, fragmented characters, and illusory/imagistic setting, conveyed in the form of a personal experience of an audience member, the work has been categorized as a distinctively postmodern play. However, because of its allegiance and focus on a Grand Narrative reconstruction it seems to stand at a distance from postmodern associations.

== Style ==
Don't go out. Stay here until
they come and take you. If you go out
nobody will know you. Each one waiting
for their own, in a station
you don't recognize, a station inside
a church. I had a dream yesterday.
We were holding hands all together
around her and were looking at
the blood under her finger-nails.
And inside her lips.
And He came and took us by the hand
and we went down and out on to the street.
And at the end of the street there were stairs and by way of the stairs
you would go down
inside the church.
From there again you would go up.
And another staircase, and more
people and we all wanted
to cross to the other side.
You could see the water from up above.
Then we said we should lie down
one on top of the other
on top of the other.
One on top of the other
until that fades too.
Don't go out.

— From "With the People from the Bridge";
Poena Damni

The People from the Bridge is fragmentary, hallucinatory, at once firmly rooted in a complex webwork of allusions and drifting free of referentiality, evading attempts to pin it down. It exhibits a version of postmodern eclecticism, alternating poetry with prose parts. Despite its postmodern affinities, it can be construed, however, in line with the High Modernist tradition setting aside the postmodern playfulness for serious and earnest handling of the subject. The text develops in a series of intermittent monologues interspersed with biblical excerpts and the comments of the first-order narrator. The biblical elements together with vampiric and dystopian images work in tandem, creating a sense of foreboding and entrapment. Language is sparse and fragmentary, leaving enough loopholes to be completed by the reader and making no explicit mention of its vampire-related theme in order to reveal its storyline in a gradual and minimalist manner. Short declarative sentences are used to convey immediacy and facticity in the depiction of a grim world. Allusions and a wealth of cultural references are conveyed through sparse and seemingly casual monologues and which, at the same time, account for the text heading simultaneously at different directions. On occasions, the monologues seems to be ungrammatical and on others, the characters seem to be turning back on their words. There is an effect akin to stream of consciousness, the text, however, develops in a linear way among the overlapping stories of the four protagonists. Ellipsis in narrative conjoined with the simplicity of stage movement and the framework of a predominantly static performance, point to ritual as well as ritualistic theatre.

== Structure ==
The work is structured in the form of an external-frame narrative by a first-order, unreliable narrator (the narrator of Z213: Exit) who sets the stage for the development of the inside story. Within this master narrative, four hyponarratives by Narrator (internal/second-order), Chorus, LG, and NCTV contribute fragments of the story from their own point of view. As different narratives within the play intertwine, new elements come to the foreground but there is also a sense in which each individual narration overlaps with the others creating an effect of multiple focalizations. The language of the text is simple and idiomatic while the syntax is occasionally disrupted by lacunae as well as incomplete sentences. Partial fragmentation combines, however, with a more conventional (although most of the time elliptical) linguistic use for the purpose of bringing forward the storytelling-like the character of the work.

== Title ==
An earlier version of the text, similar in subject matter and structure but significantly different in content and style was published in 2001 in Greek and German and in 2005 in English under the title Nyctivoe. The term Nyctivoe, a rare ancient Greek adjective, appears in an incantation to the goddess of the moon in Magical Papyri, a syncretic compilation of texts from the Hellenistic Period focusing on sorcery and folk religion. In the previous version of the book, Nyctivoe is a proper name ascribed to the female character of the story, substituted in the new version by NCTV (the sequence of consonants in Nyctivoe).

The current title makes reference both to the setting where the events in the book are described to take place as well as to the bridge crossed by the crowd in the final part of the book. The bridge as the symbol of passage from the world of the living to the realm of the dead relates to the Chinvat bridge in the Zoroastrian religion. Also, the bridge is a symbol of a non-place relating to the name of the station(Nichtovo) the narrator of the book recalls having arrived at. From a perspective of social commentary on contemporary events, the title has been also interpreted to point to the "living bridge" of illegal immigrants seeking a Promised Land of plenty.

== Publication history and critical reception ==
With the People from the Bridge
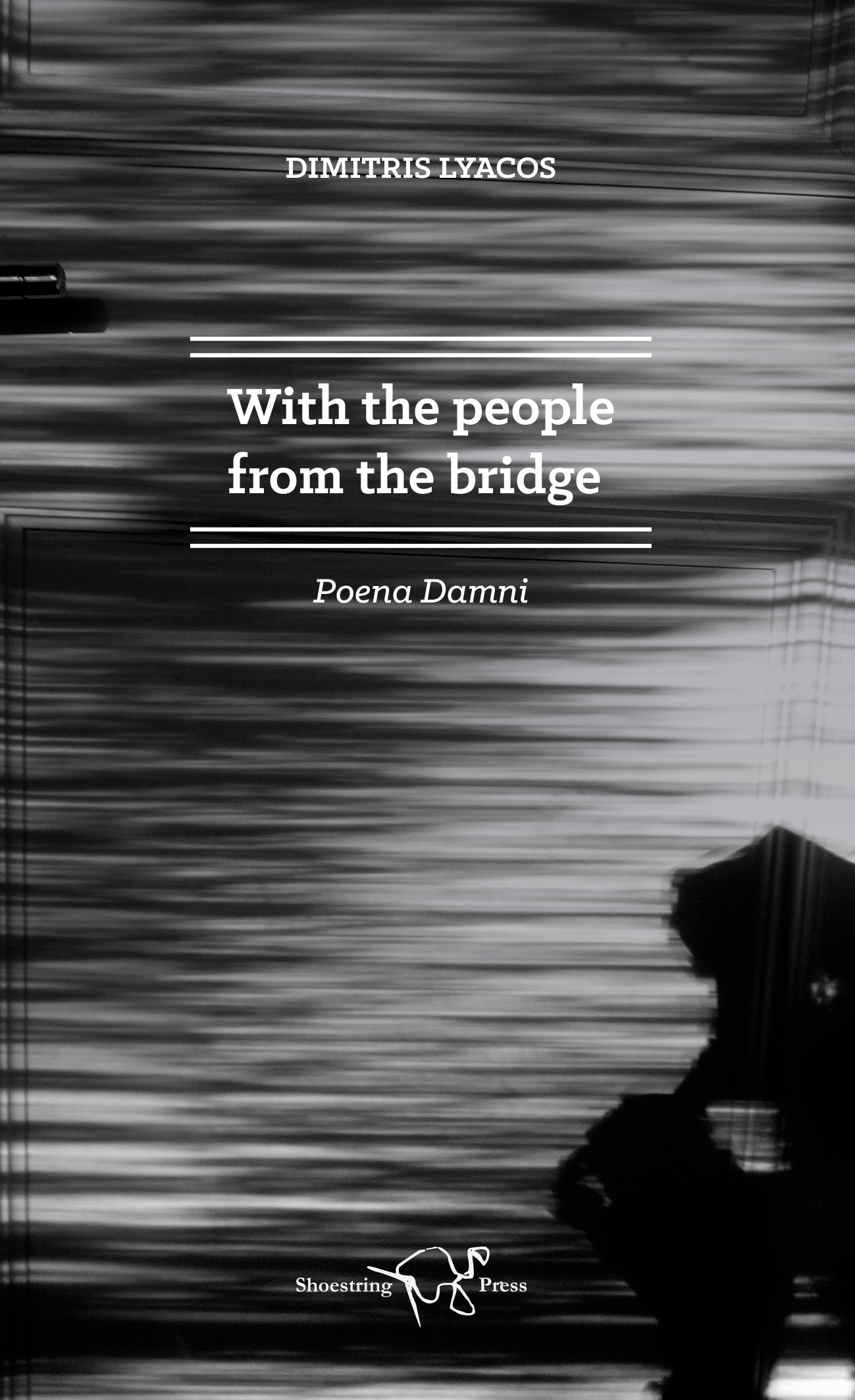
- First English edition
- Cover artist: Gudrun Bielz
- Publication date: 2014

The People from the Bridge received a number of twenty-five unanimously positive international reviews until spring 2021. Literary critic Aaron Schneider praised the book as an extraordinary reading experience due to the way the poem "articulates alienation, but, also and more importantly, [...] the way this alienation is accompanied by a pervasive sense of trauma" and concluding that "in this moment when the world has been so thoroughly de-familiarized and we have all been dislocated from ourselves, With the People from the Bridge is as essential as it is possible for a book to be. The book has been the subject of a considerable amount of scholarly criticism and also appears in the course contents of various university curricula on postmodern fiction. A second revised edition was published in October 2018 (ISBN 9781910323915).
