= Zeroth-order =

Zeroth-order may refer to:

- Zeroth-order approximation, a rough approximation
- Zeroth-order logic, is first-order logic without variables or quantifiers

== See also ==
- Zeroth (disambiguation)
