= Sparagmos =

Dionysian rite of sacrifice

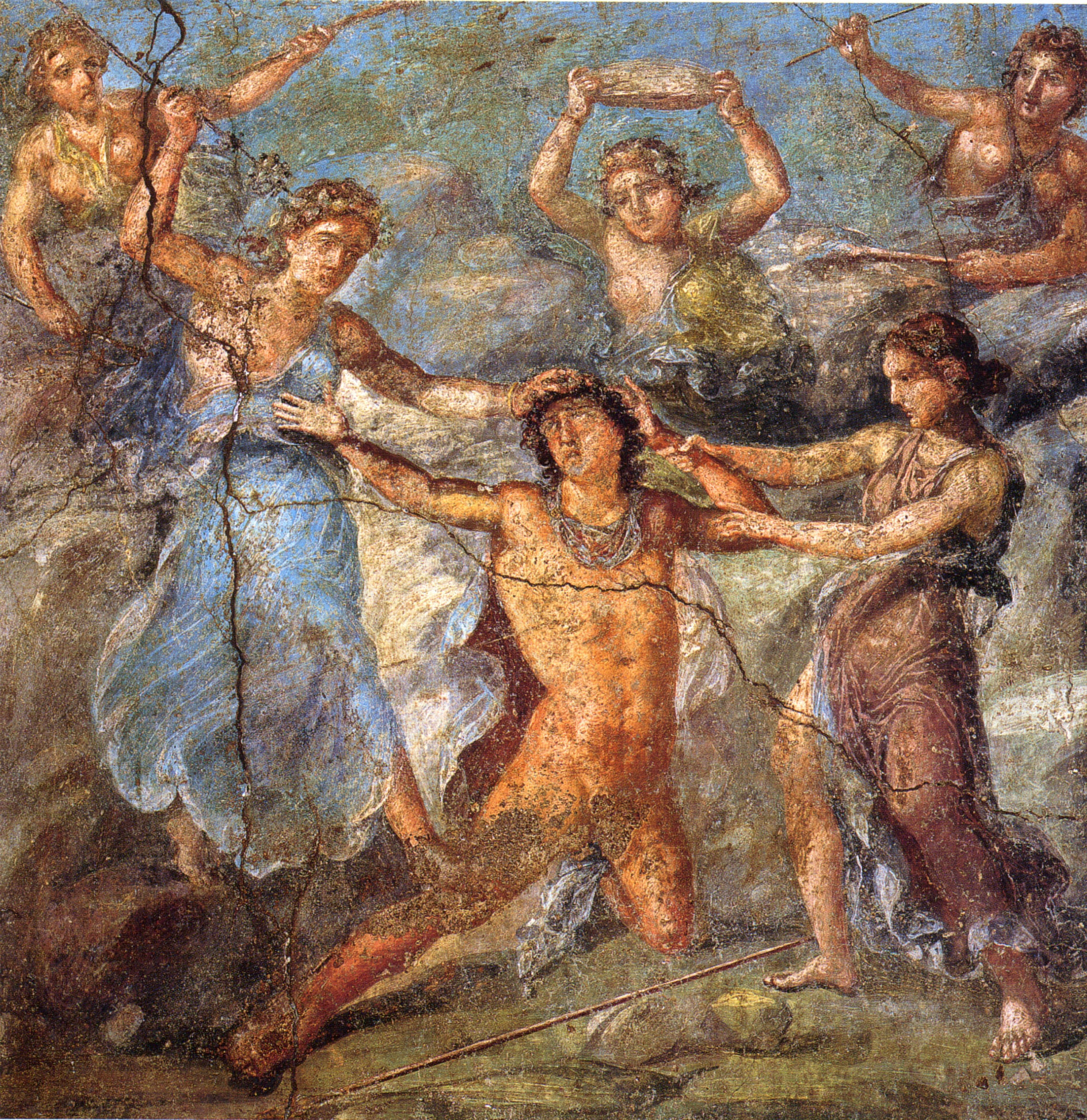
An "unspoken" sparagmos may have been the central element underlying the very genre of Greek tragedy. (Maenads and Pentheus, from the House of the Vettii)

Sparagmos (Ancient Greek: σπαραγμός, from σπαράσσω sparasso, "tear, rend, pull to pieces") is an act of rending, tearing apart, or mangling, usually in a Dionysian context.

In Dionysian rite as represented in myth and literature, a living animal, or sometimes even a human being, is sacrificed by being dismembered. Sparagmos was frequently followed by omophagia (the eating of the raw flesh of the one dismembered). It is associated with the Maenads or Bacchantes, followers of Dionysus, and the Dionysian Mysteries.

== Euripides' Bacchae ==
Examples of sparagmos appear in Euripides's play The Bacchae. In one scene guards sent to control the Maenads witness them pulling a live bull to pieces with their hands. Later, after King Pentheus has banned the worship of Dionysus, the god lures him into a forest, to be torn limb from limb by Maenads, including his own mother Agave. According to some myths, Orpheus, regarded as a prophet of Orphic or Bacchic religion, died when he was dismembered by raging Thracian women.

== Medea ==
Medea is said to have killed and dismembered her brother whilst fleeing with Jason and the stolen fleece in order to delay their pursuers, who would be compelled to collect the remains of the prince for burial. The Italian film director Pier Paolo Pasolini staged a sparagmos ritual as part of a long sequence near the beginning of his film Medea (1969), before dramatising the episode in which Medea kills her brother in a similar way.

== Modern literature and theory ==
Women celebrating the rites of Dionysus may not have actually dismembered animals or eaten raw flesh, though these acts in earlier times could have been the symbolic basis for historical maenadic ritual. Camille Paglia, in her controversial survey of Western culture Sexual Personae, uses "sparagmos" as a trope to describe flesh-rending violence in several works, including The Bacchae, contemporary horror films, Emily Bronte's Wuthering Heights, and a poem by Emily Dickinson. Through the lens of the Freudian Oedipus complex, Catherine Maxwell interprets sparagmos as a form of castration, particularly in the case of Orpheus.

Sparagmos is a central theme in Dimitris Lyacos's The First Death, which recounts the torments of a mutilated protagonist stranded on an island. The book draws upon the dismemberment of Dionysus as well as ancient Greek rituals and practices.

== See also ==
- Cambridge Ritualists
- Life-death-rebirth deity
- Tragedy
