= Until the Victim Becomes our Own =

2025 novel by Dimitris Lyacos

Until the Victim Becomes Our Own
- Author: Dimitris Lyacos
- Original title: Μέχρι το θύμα να γίνει δικό μας
- Translator: Andrew Barrett
- Cover artist: Arnold Mario Dall'O
- Language: Greek
- Genre: World Literature, Postmodernism
- Publisher: Il Saggiatore (Italian translation), Indirect Books
- Publication date: 2 May 2025 Italian Edition
- Publication place: various
- English publication date: 23 February 2027 US/UK Edition
- Media type: Print (paperback)
- Pages: 272 Italian Edition/411 English Edition (including A Notebook for the Victims)
- ISBN: 9788842834267
- Followed by: Z213: Exit

Until the Victim Becomes Our Own is a composite novel by Greek author Dimitris Lyacos. Conceived as the book "zeroth" of the Poena Damni trilogy, the book explores violence in its various manifestations, as a constitutive element in the formation of human societies and the eventual position of the individual in a world "permeated by institutionalized power". The novel outlines a portrait of Western civilization, examined and reassessed from its Judeo-Christian foundations, through industrialization and the development of advanced forms of coercion, to a harmony imposed by cybernetic control. Employing alternating narrators, the book's standalone chapters complement each other in a sequence akin to various techniques of cinematic montage.

A separate hybrid section (not included in the Italian edition), A Notebook for the Victims, assembles an archive of primary and secondary sources drawn from across the sciences and humanities, interspersed with the author's commentary. Looping back to Chapter H, in which the redaction of “the book” is presented as an exercise of power, the section turns the work's own process of compilation and redaction into a further instance of the systems it depicts.

== Themes ==
Until the Victim Becomes Our Own explores the evolution of violence in a sequence of chapters each headed by a letter of the classical Latin alphabet. The prologue evokes the attack and barbaric murder committed by a mother chimpanzee (called M2) and her son against the cub of another mother (called M1), similar to the story of Passion and Pom recounted by primatologist Jane Goodall. The first chapter is an episode reminiscent of Cain's murder of Abel from the book of Genesis. Further episodes depict violence in its socially more advanced, institutionalized forms, presenting in two consecutive sections the practice of incarceration from two different vantage points: L focuses on an inmate as part of the prison's general population, and M is a take on SHU, the segregation housing unit—solitary confinement. Chapter N discusses, in essay-like form, Law as a technology that excises and cures animal instincts. The book's take on physical violence culminates in chapter S which presents in detail the industrial slaughter and handling of an animal in a contemporary slaughterhouse. Closing chapters focus on violence's self-effacement, in the form of cybernetic order (X) and psychiatric rehabilitation (Y). The narrative concludes with an unnamed voice calling upon the protagonist of the last chapter (Z) to flee to an uncharted new world. The final section, A Notebook for the Victims, brings together fragments of myth, science, and history looping back into the preceding narrative, linking its archival materials to the work’s process of redaction and creation.

Lyacos has given a series of interviews in Italian and American magazines discussing the various themes of the book, in particular violence and coercion in contemporary societies. In his interview in Doppiozero, the author uses the term "cybernetic messianism" to refer to a combination of cybernetic control and human-machine communication as a solution to the problem of violence.

== Critical reception ==
The book was selected in the Top 10 of the Turin International Book Fair by the Italian daily Il Giornale. According to the newspaper, Lyacos immerses the reader in his "total literature". In a note entitled "That hell in which Western society locks us in" the book is mentioned as "particularly suited to the climate of violence that we have been experiencing with special intensity in the past years. In such context, the only way out for the victim consists in relying on the thaumaturgical power of a superior system". Vanni Santoni in the Lettura of Corriere della Sera refers to Lyacos as one of "the possible future Nobel Prize winners (or at least as the only living Greek eligible)" and considers the work in its entirety with its the games of references, the insistence on certain themes and images as entirely programmatic". Filippomaria Pontani in Il Sole 24 Ore claims that the author "aims to investigate the biological origins of evil in society, with particular reference to exclusion and marginalisation, from the perspective of animal dynamics" and compares Lyacos' approach to the cinema of Stanley Kubrick and Yorgos Lanthimos. Alessandro Mantovani in Il Foglio writes: "Lyacos' writing is dense, evocative and fragmentary, alternating lysergic monologues with sharp dialogues, restoring the complexity of a world in which suffering is both an origin and a destiny. A versatile and profound work capable of speaking to our present with a rare force". According to Alberto Fraccacreta in his review in Avvenire, "the profound social criticism of Lyacos is not exhausted in the progressive transformations of violence, but aims at a future liberation that resolves itself in the escape towards a more humane world". The book has also been hailed as "one of the most radical works of contemporary European literature, a writing that moves between biblical exegesis and post-human aesthetics, between Artaud and Genet, between Blanchot and Pasolini."

== Publication history ==
The first full book version, translated by Viviana Sebastio, was published in Italy by Il Saggiatore in 2 May 2025.. The English translation is due to appear in February 2027 by Indirect Books. The Russian translation is due to appear in September 2027 by Freedom Letters.

Chapter O in Albanian translation appeared in Revista Letrare in 2022. Chapter G in English translation appeared in Mayday Magazine in March 2023, chapter D in Image in March 2024, chapter V in the Chicago Review in August 2024, chapter L in River Styx in December 2024, and in The Pittsburgh Review of Books in January 2026 and chapter C in the Columbia Review in October 2025. Chapters A, B and C translated in Hebrew by Ioram Melcer appeared in Alaxon magazine in September 2024. Chapter O appeared in Romanian translation in the review Observator Cultural in May 2025.
