= Zeroth law =

Zeroth law may refer to:

- Zeroth law of black hole thermodynamics, about event horizons of black holes
- Zeroth law of robotics, an addition to Isaac Asimov's Three Laws of Robotics
- Zeroth law of thermodynamics, in relation to thermal equilibriums

== See also ==
- Zeroth (disambiguation)
