= Z213: Exit =

2009 novel by Dimitris Lyacos

Z213: EXIT
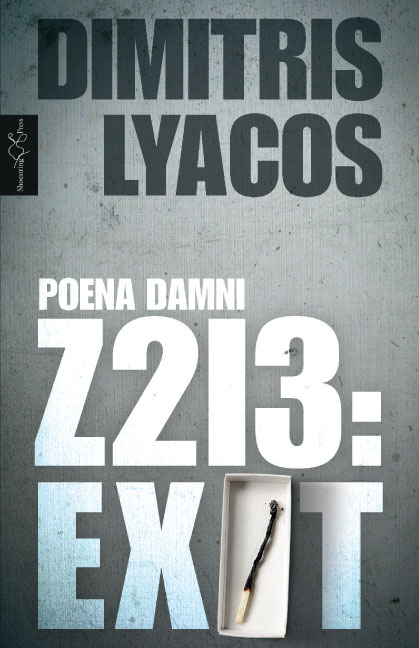
- Z213: EXIT, Front Cover of Second Edition
- Author: Dimitris Lyacos
- Original title: Ζ213: ΕΞΟΔΟΣ
- Translator: Shorsha Sullivan
- Cover artist: Dominik Ziller
- Language: Greek
- Series: Poena Damni
- Genre: Postmodernism
- Publisher: Shoestring Press
- Publication date: 2009–2018 (2009 First Edition, Greek)
- Publication place: Greece
- English publication date: 2010 (First Edition)
- Pages: 101 (First Edition)/152 (Second Edition)
- ISBN: 9781910323625
- Preceded by: Until the Victim Becomes our Own
- Followed by: With the People from the Bridge

Z213: Exit is a 2009–2018 novel by Greek author Dimitris Lyacos. It is the first installment of the Poena Damni trilogy. It is the first book of the trilogy in narrative order, but the third to be published in the series. The work develops as a sequence of fragmented diary entries recording the solitary experiences of an unnamed, Ulysses-like persona in the course of a train voyage gradually transformed into an inner exploration of the boundaries between self and reality. The voyage is also akin to the experience of a religious quest with a variety of biblical references, mostly from the Old Testament, embedded into the text which is often fractured and foregoing punctuation. Most critics place Z213: Exit in a postmodern context exploring correlations with such writers as Samuel Beckett and Cormac McCarthy while others underline its modernist affinities and the work's firm foundation on classical and religious texts.

Z213: Exit is difficult to classify by genre, and is simultaneously a novella, a poem, and a journal. In contradistinction to "factual report" works such as If This Is a Man by Primo Levi, the work adopts a mode of oneiric realism whereby horror is forced beneath the surface of consciousness only to emerge again in new and increasingly nightmarish forms. Oblique references to tragedies of recent human history are apparent, although, ample Biblical and mythical motives suggest a far broader project. The book can be read as the first volume of a postmodern epic. It is considered as one of the most important anti-utopian works of the 21st century as well as one of the greatest works of Greek literature of all time.

== Synopsis ==
The work recounts, in what reads like a personal journal, in verse form as well as in postmodern poetic prose, the wanderings of a man who escapes from a guarded building, in a nightmarish version of a post-Armageddon ambient. In the opening sections of the book, the narrator/protagonist flees from what seems like imprisonment in a building consisting of wards and personnel and from where people are being inexplicably taken away to be thrown into pits. The fugitive leaves the "camp" to get to the nearby train station and starts a journey he records in a "found" bible-like booklet which he turns into his diary. As the journey continues a growing sense of paranoia ensues and the idea of being pursued becomes an increasingly central preoccupation. There are no pursuers to be identified, however, in the course of the journey and the supposed hunt remains a mystery until the end. The environment seems to allude to a decadent futuristic state of a totalitarian kind. The journey is mapped in an indeterminate way, though oblique references create a feeling of a time/space vacuum. The narrator seems to be moving ahead while at the same time being engulfed in his own nightmarish fantasies. Z213: Exit ends with a description of a sacrifice where the protagonist and a "hungry band feasting" roast a lamb on a spit, cutting and skinning its still bleating body and removing its entrails as if observing a sacred rite. The mood is enhanced by the overriding waste-land setting, which could be (it is never explicit) the result of a war that has left the landscape in ruins. The general impression is reminiscent of a spiritual quest or an eschatological experience.

== Title ==
The title of the book seems to present a case of overdetermination, and a variety of proposals by scholars and reviewers alike have been made, pointing at different directions within the text. There is a general impression that, given the book's content as an escapee's fictional diary, Z213 could indicate an inmate's unique number, ward, or section in a supposed detention center. A number of other interpretations have been suggested as follows:

- 1313 – namely 13 repeated twice is the year of the Red(reed) sea crossing as well as the year of the revelation on the Mount Sinai.
- 213 AD is the year of the implementation by Constitutio Antoniniana by which all freemen were given the right to Roman citizenship with the exception of the Dediticii. The book makes specific reference to them and to a state of statelessness.
- In 213 BCE major book burnings take place in China after a decision by Emperor Qin Shi Huang.
- In Matthew 2:13 an angel prompts Mary and Joseph to flee to Egypt in order to avoid Herod's massacre.
- The book makes oblique reference to an unnamed substance which seems to provoke states of hallucination: According to the book's character, the letter Z is the second letter of the name of the substance followed by "some numbers".
- The letter Z is related to the root of the word Azazel (לַעֲזָאזֵל la-aza'zeyl), designating the scapegoat cast in the wilderness in Leviticus 16. An explicit reference to the Leviticus excerpt is made in the book.
- The time of the initial departure of the protagonist from the train station is 21.13. The same passage refers to Ulysses and Moses, two archetypal wanderers.

== Themes ==
Z213: Exit re-contextualizes elements from the greater Greek canon – including the escaped hero and the devout wanderer. It revolves around a variety of interconnected themes, with the quest and the scapegoat, in both its social and its religious dimension, being predominant preoccupations. Through the escape and gradual alienation of the book's main character fleeing from a structure that is presented as a sort of confinement, an individual is shown to be the putative victim of a persecuting order. This is complicated further by the underlying trauma of a real – or imagined – social collapse whose details unfold in the course of the narrator's voyage. Exposure outside the limits of a familiar world is also detrimental to the composure of both self and reality which the narrator/author must reestablish. Banishment brings with it the strife to reconstruct a familiar universe, through the formation of new and assimilation of, at times, incomprehensible, nightmarish, or hallucinatory experiences. Reinventing a "personal reality", relating to others and seeking a metaphysically firm foundation are major concerns leading to existential angst and a growing sense of paranoia. Simultaneously, there is an effort to reach an absent God who seems to constantly recede away from the protagonist's reach, evoking experiences described by mystics of negative theology, Dante's Inferno and The Book of Job.

== Style ==
But no one. You are far away, no one knows you, no one wants to find you, and no one is looking for you. And tomorrow you will be somewhere else still farther away, still more difficult yet, even if they would send someone. But they don't know the way and before they find out you have decamped somewhere else. They know how to search but they don't know what way. And even if they set off from somewhere they will still be quite far. And they will not be many. Perhaps just one. One is like all of them together. Same eyes that search, the same mind that calculates the next move. Same legs that run same arms that spread wide. Ears straining to listen, nostrils over their prey. Always acted like that. Two eyes, two ears, two nostrils, two arms, two legs. The symmetry of the machine that pursues you.

— From "Z213: EXIT";
Poena Damni

Z213: Exit uses the device of the palimpsest to convey the various layers of its mythical, historical, and fictional content. Beginning in medias res, it builds a sort of unsolvable lore around its narrator/protagonist, alternating poetry and prose in order to represent his inner thoughts and experiences. Poetic tropes combine interchangeably with an almost telegraphic style omitting articles and conjunctions, while using the rhetorics of diary form; mainly colloquial, with violations and distortions of grammar. Free-floating sentences and lacunae form occasionally a broken unstructured syntax, seemingly tight but leaving enough loopholes through which subconscious fears are expressed. At the same time, there is rhythmic use of language creating a musicality in the midst of despair.

It has been noted that Z213: Exit exhibits the deep structure of tragedy - instead of its formal characteristics - and has thus been called a post-tragic work. Religious and visionary images as well as a biblical style of language, predominate with the Old Testament (mostly Torah), and various ancient Greek texts being recurrent reference points. Sometimes external sources are amended and seamlessly integrated into the text becoming part of the protagonist's narrative. On the linguistic level the text itself creates a liminal and fragmented landscape thus depicting the fracture of temporal and spatial relations within the universe unraveled in the course of the journey. Ultimately, the text seems to obtain its own independent status, to consider, arrange and re-arrange itself.

== Publication history and reception ==
The original Greek version (Greek title: Z213: ΕΞΟΔΟΣ) was first published in 2009. The English translation by Shorsha Sullivan appeared in 2010 by Shoestring Press, followed by a second revised edition in 2016. The book, in its two editions, is the most widely reviewed work of contemporary Greek literature in translation. Critic Michael O' Sullivan hailed the book as "a wonderfully dark yet enticing description of what might be described as a philosophy of exits and entrances" and as "sitting comfortably among such works as Kafka's "Before the Law" and Beckett's short poem "My way is in the sand flowing". Literature critic and Robinson Jeffers scholar Robert Zaller considered the book as "one of the most important and challenging literary works to come from Greece in the past generation". The work is regarded as a characteristic exponent of the fragmentation technique in contemporary literature while at the same time perceived as an inheritor of epic poetry, molding the ancient storytelling tradition to a post-modern idiom. Z213: EXIT belongs to the canon of postmodern texts published in the new millennium and Lyacos' s Poena Damni trilogy is, arguably, the most significant Greek work in the course of postmodern literature and drama history. The trilogy, as a whole, is also categorized as an example of ergodic literature, the postmodern sublime, as well as one of the most important anti-utopian works of the 21st century. Commercially, the book has been one of the best-selling titles of contemporary European poetry in English translation. A new, revised version of Z213: Exit(ISBN 9781910323625) appeared in October 2016 while the full trilogy was published in a Box Set English Edition in 2018.
