= Enorches =

Ancient Greek mythological figure

Enorchus (Ancient Greek: Ἐνόρχης) or Enorches (Enorchês) is a figure from Greek mythology for whom the only surviving sources are scholia on the Alexandra of Lycophron.

== Mythology ==
According to the scholia, Enorchus was a son of Thyestes by his sister Daeta (or Daesa) and was born out of an egg. He built a temple to Dionysus, which is given as the explanation for the fact that Enorches is also an epithet of Dionysus. According to the scholia it is his epithet at Lesbos, though Hesychius states – without giving a reason or mentioning the son of Thyestes – that the place was Samos.

== Depiction ==
Enorchus is possibly represented on an oil jar (lekythos) from around 430–425 BCE. The image depicts an altar on which rests an egg, within which is an infant – naked except for a necklace of amulets – who reaches towards a woman standing to the right as she stares at the altar.

The identification is, however, heavily contested, with Helen of Troy being offered as a more probable identification (the woman thus being Leda). In favour of the identification as Enorchus, Lesley Beaumont points out that the hairstyle of the infant matches the common representation of that of infant boys on red-figure iconography, and Gratia Berger-Doer argues that the amulet necklace around his neck identifies him as a so-called 'temple boy'.

Nina Zimmermann-Elseify, however, argues that the fact that this type of figure on oenochoae is usually a male infant can be explained by the painter not having access to a pattern for painting female infants. Lilly Kahil and Noëlle Icard further note that it is more likely to be Helen based on the far greater popularity of the myths surrounding Helen's birth from an egg.
