= Omophagia =

Mythical ritual consumption of raw meat in Ancient Greece

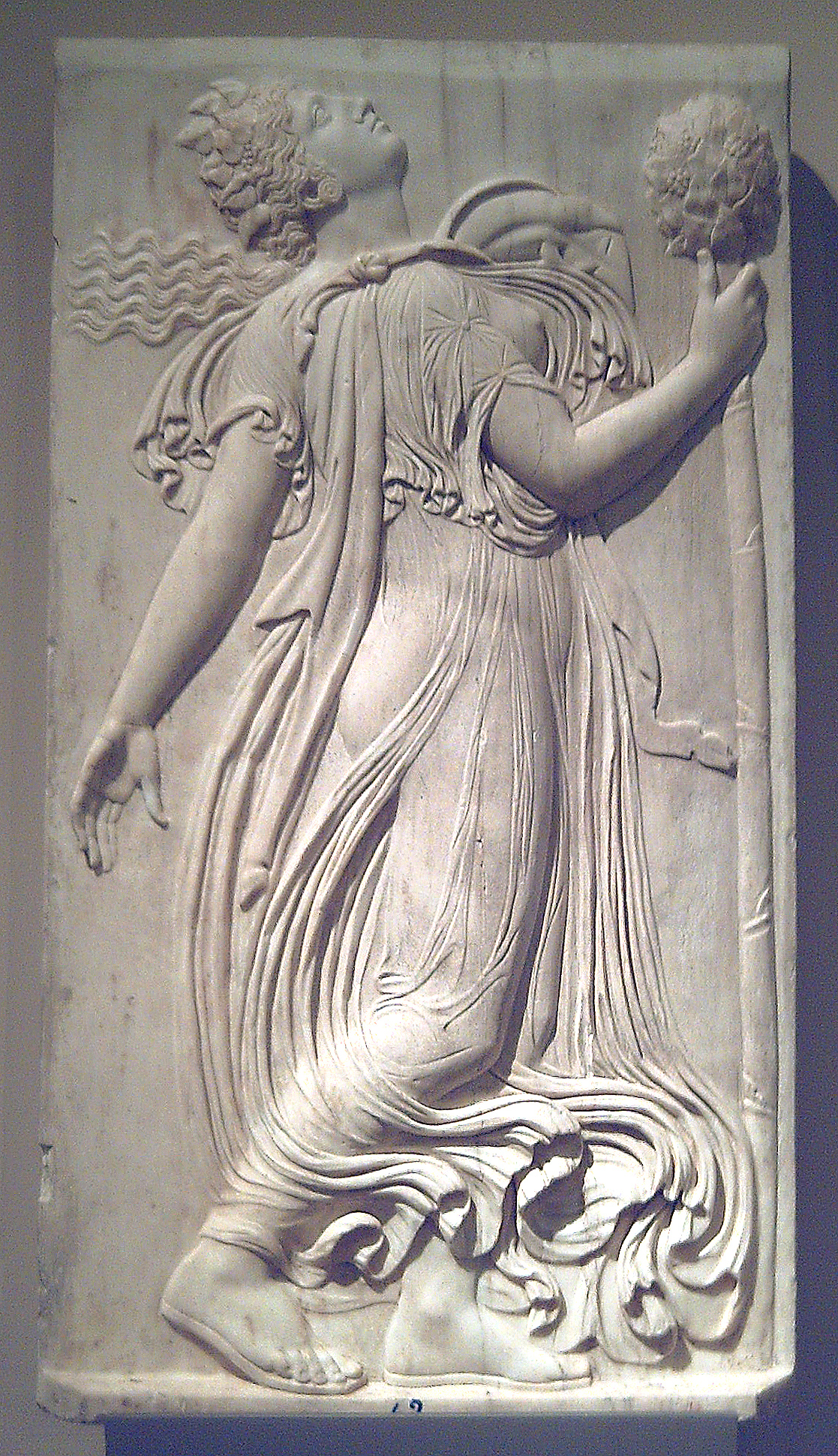
Marble image of a dancing Maenad; approximately 120–140 AD. Attributed to Callimachus.

Omophagia, or omophagy (from Greek ωμός "raw") is the eating of raw flesh. The term is of importance in the context of the cult worship of Dionysus.

Omophagia is a large element of Dionysiac myth; in fact, one of Dionysus' epithets is Omophagos "Raw-Eater". Omophagia may have been a symbol of the triumph of wild nature over civilization, and a symbol of the breaking down of boundaries between nature and civilization. It might also have been symbolic that the worshippers were internalizing Dionysus' wilder traits and his association with brute nature, in a sort of "communion" with the god.

Mythology sometimes depicts maenads, Dionysus' female worshippers, eating raw meat as part of their worship; however, there is little solid evidence that historical maenads consumed raw meat.

The Dionysiac diet of raw meat may be more properly attributed to Dionysus himself, rather than his followers—he received sacrifices of raw meat and was believed to consume them, but his followers did not share in the consumption.

== Orphism ==
The Orphic mysteries originated as a ritual which focused on purification and the afterlife; the mysteries were based on the stories of Dionysus Zagreus. Zagreus was the child of Zeus and Persephone, who was torn apart by the Titans in an act of sparagmos. After tearing Zagreus apart, the Titans devoured him, except for his heart.

His body was then reassembled; this may be reflected in the story of Pentheus, whose body parts were gathered together after his mother, aunt and other Maenads tore him apart in a Dionysic frenzy, and the story of Actaeon, who was eaten by his own hunting dogs. Because the dogs grieved so deeply after Actaeon's death, an image of him was made to comfort them. All three stories show a common motif of reassembly of body parts following sparagmos and omophagia, and this motif may have been significant for religious ritual.

In Orphism, worshippers took part in an Orphic ritual which reenacted the story of Zagreus, using a bull as their victim (poorer worshippers may have used a goat instead). They considered the ritual to be "commemorative" of events in their god's existence. In his article "A New Ritual of the Orphic Mysteries", Michael Tierney says that "... by sacramental re-enactment of the god's death, a hope of salvation for his worshippers was obtained." Dionysus became associated with Zagreus, and the story of having been torn apart and eaten by the Titans was applied to him as well.

Omophagia was the focus of the Dionysiac mysteries, and a component of Orphic ceremonies. In its beginnings, Orphism was influenced by the Eleusinian mysteries, and it adopted stories from other mythologies as its own. The worshippers of Zagreus may have engaged in omophagia as an initiation rite.

== The Bacchae ==
Euripides' play The Bacchae focuses on the worship of Dionysus, including allusions to omophagia and its companion sparagmos (dismemberment). In this play, the character Agave tears her son Pentheus apart while under the influence of Dionysus. Because Euripides depicts Agave as engaging in sparagmos, he likely intended for the audiences to assume she engaged in omophagia as well. Additionally, the character Cadmus compares Agave's actions to the story of Actaeon, who was consumed by his own hunting dogs—this association further suggests that omophagia took place.

There is another possible instance of omophagia in The Bacchae. At one point in the play, the maenads go into a nearby town and carry off the children; it is possible that the maenads then consumed them. In art and myth, this incident is linked to omophagia; however, Euripides may not have intended this meaning in The Bacchae.
