= OTH =

OTH may refer to:

- Optical Transport Hierarchy, in telecommunications
- Other than honorable discharge, a US military discharge
- Over-the-horizon radar
- Over the horizon boat, a type of cutterboat in the U.S. Coast Guard.
- Airport code for Southwest Oregon Regional Airport
- Our Tampines Hub, a community building, Singapore
- Opportunity to hear, a term used in radio advertising.
- One Tree Hill (TV series), a 2003–2012 American drama series.

== See also ==
- 0th (i.e. "zeroth")
