= Dimitris Lyacos =

Greek writer and playwright (born 1966)

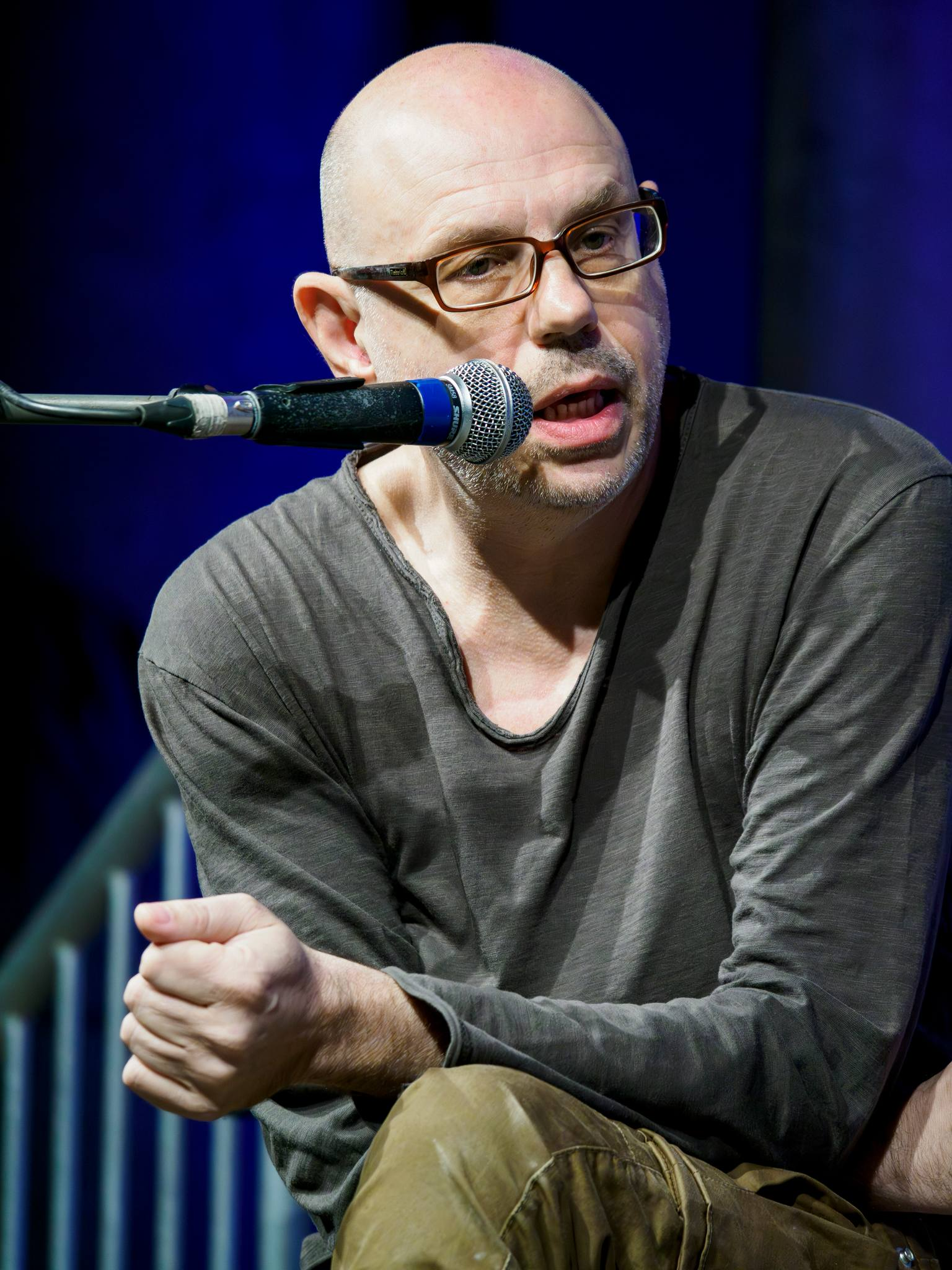
- Born: 19 October 1966 (age 59); Athens, Greece
- Occupations: Poet, playwright
- Writing career
- Period: Contemporary
- Genre: Cross-genre
- Notable work: Z213: Exit (2009)
- Literary movement: Postmodern literature
- Website: lyacos.net

Dimitris Lyacos (Greek: Δημήτρης Λυάκος; born 19 October 1966) is a Greek writer. He is the author of the composite novel Until the Victim Becomes our Own and the Poena Damni trilogy. Lyacos's work has been critically defined as post-tragic, is characterised by its genre-defying form and the avant-garde combination of themes from literary tradition with elements from ritual, religion, philosophy and anthropology.

Until the Victim Becomes Our Own explores the evolution of violence in a sequence of chapters each headed by a letter of the classical Latin alphabet. The prologue evokes the attack and barbaric murder committed by a mother chimpanzee (called M2) and her son against the cub of another mother (called M1), similar to the story of Passion and Pom recounted by primatologist Jane Goodall. The first chapter is an episode reminiscent of Cain's murder of Abel from the book of Genesis. Further episodes depict violence in its socially more advanced, institutionalized forms.

The Poena Damni trilogy interchanges prose, drama and poetry in a fractured narrative that reflects some of the principal motifs of the Western Canon. The overall text counts no more than two hundred and fifty pages, with the individual books revised and republished in different editions during a period of twenty years. The three works are arranged around a cluster of concepts including the scapegoat, the quest, the return of the dead, redemption, physical suffering, and mental illness. Lyacos's characters are always at a distance from society as such, fugitives, like the narrator of Z213: Exit, outcasts in a dystopian hinterland like in With the People from the Bridge, or marooned, like the protagonist of The First Death whose struggle for survival unfolds on a desert-like island. Poena Damni has been construed as an "allegory of unhappiness" together with works of authors such as Gabriel García Márquez and Thomas Pynchon, as well as Cormac McCarthy and has been acknowledged as an exponent of the postmodern sublime and as one of the notable anti-utopian works of the 21st century. Dimitris Lyacos is also mentioned among of the notable postmodern authors of the 21st century, as well as among Greece's likely candidates for a Nobel Prize in Literature.

Lyacos's works are published exclusively in translation. As of 2024, Until the Victim Becomes our Own and Poena Damni have not appeared in the Greek original.

== Life ==
Lyacos was born and raised in Athens, where he studied law. From 1988 to 1991 he lived in Venice. In 1992 he moved to London. He studied philosophy at University College London with analytical philosophers Ted Honderich and Tim Crane focusing on Epistemology and Metaphysics, Ancient Greek philosophy and Wittgenstein. In 2005 he moved to Berlin. He is currently based in Berlin and Athens.

== Career ==
In 1992, Lyacos set about writing a trilogy under the collective name Poena Damni, referring to the hardest trial the condemned souls in Hell have to endure, i.e. the loss of the vision of God. The trilogy has developed gradually as a work in progress in the course of thirty years. The third part (The First Death) appeared first in Greek (Ο πρώτος θάνατος) and was later translated into English, Spanish and German. The second part under the title "Nyctivoe" was initially published in 2001 in Greek and German, and came out in English in 2005. This work was substituted in 2014 by a new version under the title With the People from the Bridge. Dimitris Lyacos was Writer in Residence at the International Writing Program, University of Iowa. Lyacos appearances in literary festivals include International Literature Festival of Tbilisi in 2017, Transpoesie Festival, Brussels., International Literary Festival of Pristina, Bucharest International Poetry Festival., Ritratti di Poesia, Rome, Campania Libri, Napoli and Turin International Book Fair in 2025 and 2026. Until autumn 2022 Lyacos's work was translated in 21 languages with the full trilogy having appeared in 7 languages. The Italian version of the trilogy was voted by Indiscreto Journal among the most important books in translation published in Italy in 2022.

== Until the Victim Becomes our Own ==
Until the Victim Becomes our Own is a composite novel. Conceived as the book "zeroth" of the Poena Damni trilogy the book explores violence in its various manifestations, as a constitutive element in the formation of human societies and the eventual position of the individual in a world "permeated by institutionalized power". Described as prequel to Lyacos' trilogy, Until the Victim Becomes our Own outlines a portrait of Western civilization, examined and reassessed from its Judeo-Christian foundations, through industrialization and the development of advanced forms of coercion, to a harmony imposed by cybernetic control. Employing alternating narrators, the book's standalone chapters complement each other in a sequence akin to various techniques of cinematic montage. The book was published in Italian by Il Saggiatore in May 2025.

== Poena Damni ==
=== Summary/Context ===
The trilogy would appear to belong to a context of tragic poetry and epic drama, albeit distinctly postmodern at the same time. It explores the deep structure of tragedy instead of its formal characteristics, having thus been called a post-tragic work. Homer, Aeschylus and Dante as well as the darker aspects of romantic poetry together with symbolism, expressionism, and an intense religious and philosophical interest permeate the work. Poena Damni has thus been related, despite its postmodern traits, more to the High Modernist tradition of James Joyce and Virginia Woolf The first of the three pieces, Z213: Exit (Z213: ΕΞΟΔΟΣ), accounts a man's escape from a guarded city and his journey through dreamlike, sometimes nightmarish, lands. In the second book, With the People from the Bridge (Με Τους Ανθρώπους Από Τη Γέφυρα) the protagonist of Z213: Exit becomes a first-degree Narrator appearing as one spectator in a makeshift play performed under the arches of a derelict train station. The third book, The First Death (Ο Πρώτος Θάνατος) opens with a marooned man on a rocky island and details his struggle for survival as well as the disintegration of his body and the unrolling of its memory banks.

=== Survey ===
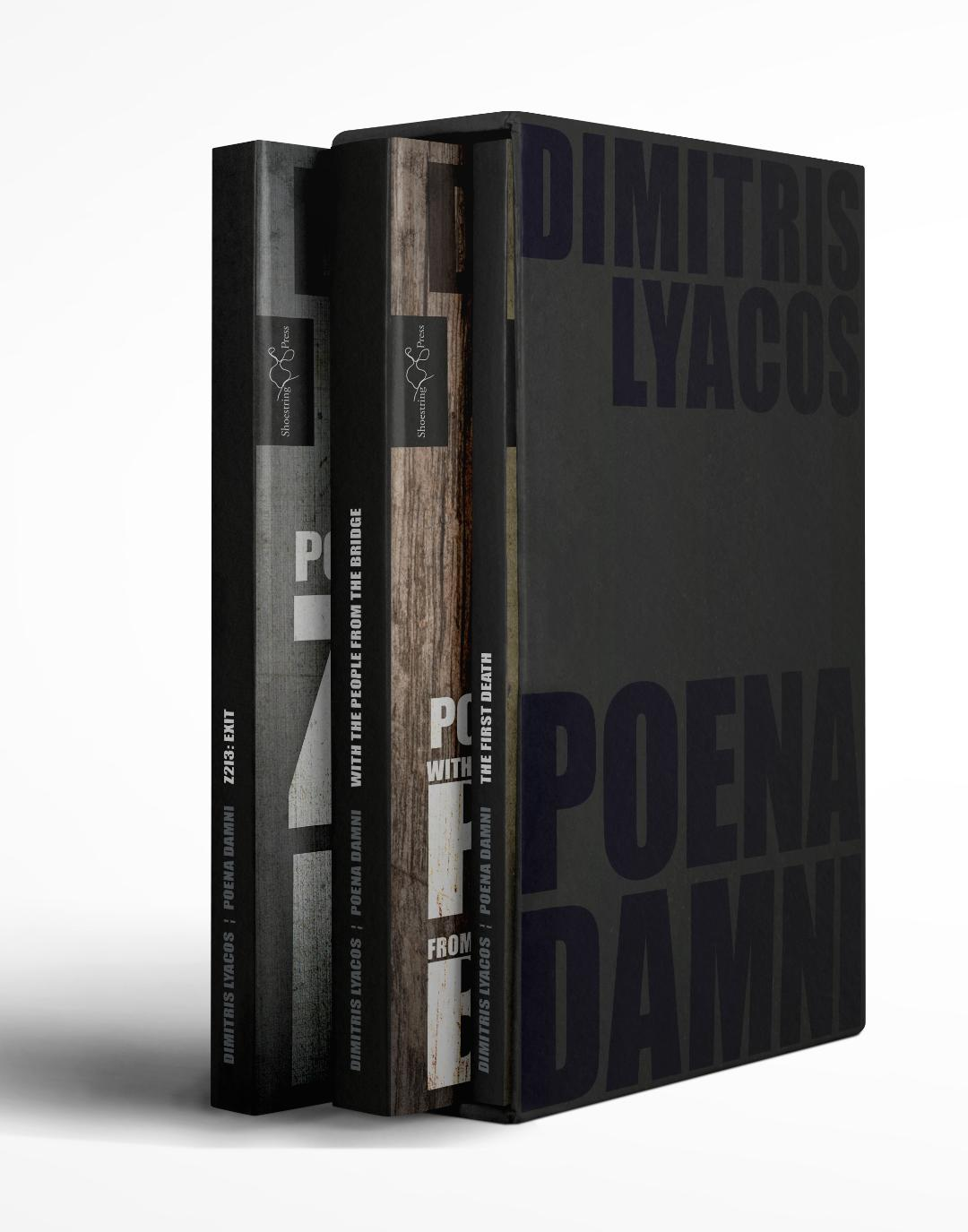
Poena Damni the Trilogy (3-Book Box Set, English Edition)

The work is hard to classify since it crosses the usual boundaries of genre. Z213: Exit re-contextualizes elements from the greater Greek canon – including the escaped hero and the devote wanderer. It often takes narrative form, mixing poetry and prose. The trilogy moves into dramatic representation of character and situation in With the People from the Bridge, and subsequently to a hard lyrical kind of poetry used to depict the break-up and eventual apotheosis of the body in The First Death. The possibilities of divergence between the perceived and the objective outside world are exploited; the reader follows the irregular flow of internal monologues stemming from events in the external world but ultimately viewed as reflected onto the thinking and feeling surfaces of the protagonist's mind. On the other hand, an alien setting and the unfolding, dreamlike occurrences are presented as alternate realities, or, unveiling a hidden dimension of the world. From that perspective, the work has been interpreted as a kind of surfiction whereby the world depicted within the trilogy allows an open space for the reader to contribute his own internalized version.

=== Z213: Exit ===
Z213: Exit uses the device of the palimpsest to present a fictional tissue combining elements of both ancient and modern sources as well as the "dialogue" of its two protagonists. It is composed of a series of fragmented entries in a fictional diary recording the experiences of an unnamed protagonist during a train journey into an unknown land. The man has been released - or escaped - from some time of confinement elliptically described in his journal and reminiscent of a hospital, prison, ghetto or enclave of some sort. His subsequent wanderings among desolate landscapes on the verge of reality are set in a closely detailed, and somehow Kafkaesque, atmosphere, underlining the point that the most dreamlike occurrences are also the realest. Along the way, the protagonist delves deeper in what seems like a quasi-religious quest while, at the same time, his growing impression of being stalked introduces an element of suspense and a film noir-like quality. Thus, the text hinges on the metaphysical but is also reminiscent of an L.A. private eye in a 1940s detective novel closing upon an extraordinary discovery. Z213: Exit ends with a description of a sacrifice where the protagonist and a "hungry band feasting" roast a lamb on a spit, cutting and skinning its still bleating body and removing its entrails as if observing a sacred rite.

=== With the People from the Bridge ===
With the People from the Bridge is fragmentary, hallucinatory, at once firmly rooted in a complex webwork of allusions and drifting free of referentiality, evading attempts to pin it down. The plot hinges on the story of a character resembling the Gerasene demoniac from St. Mark's gospel, living in a cemetery, tormented by demons, and cutting himself with stones. He enters the tomb of his dead lover attempting to open the coffin in which she seems to lie in a state not affected by decomposition and the urgency of his desire reanimates her body whose passage back to life is described. The grave becomes a "fine and private place" for lovers still capable of embracing.

The story recounts a multiperspectival narrative based on the theme of the revenant through the first-person embedded accounts of four characters: a man possessed by demons attempts to resurrect the body of his lover but ends in joining her in the grave. The action is enveloped in a context reminiscent of a festival for the dead as well as that of a vampire epidemic. There are clear references to Christian tradition and eschatology and the piece results in a joint contemplation of collective salvation which is ultimately left unresolved after a final narrative twist.

=== The First Death ===
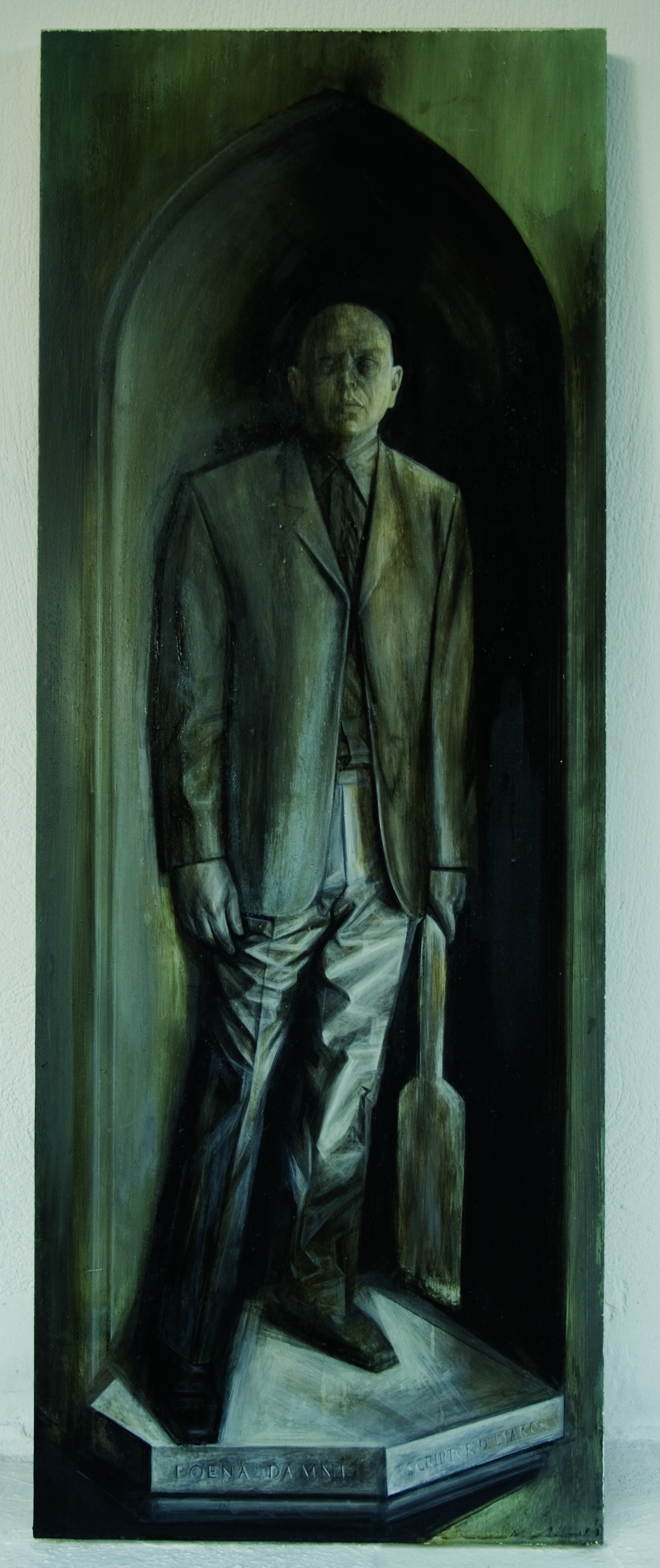
Poet Lyacos with a beater. Yiannis Melanitis, oil painting on prepared wooden panel, 104 x 39,2 cm, 2012-13

In The First Death a place is denied to the mutilated body which grinds against the rocks and suffers continuing degradation, physical and mental, as even the mechanisms of memory are dislocated. Yet the bond between person and body that ensures life still persists, and, "at that point without substance/ where the world collides and takes off", the mechanical instincts of the cosmos rumble into action and sling this irreducible substance again into space - prompting, perhaps, a future regeneration.

== Interview Essays ==
Lyacos's literary output is complemented by a series of interviews that aim to function as a conceptual companion to his work and, at the same time, informally expand on a variety of literature-related subjects as well as philosophy, religion, cinema and the arts. These interviews have appeared on an annual basis in outlets including Pittsburgh Review of Books (White Coal - 2026), Another Chicago Magazine (We Are Domesticators - 2025), the Michigan Quarterly Review (Flowing from an absent source - 2024), The Common (Violence and its Other - 2024), World Literature Today (A World to Be Repaired - 2021), 3:AM Magazine (Entangled Narratives and Dionysian Frenzy - 2020), Los Angeles Review of Books (Neighboring Yet Alien - 2019), BOMB (A Dissociated Locus - 2018), Berfrois (Controlled Experience - 2018), Gulf Coast (An Interview with Dimitris Lyacos - 2018) and The Bitter Oleander (2016).

== Critical reception ==
The Italian version of Until the Victim Becomes our Own was selected in the Top 10 of the Turin International Book Fair by the Italian daily Il Giornale. Vanni Santoni in the Lettura of Corriere della Sera refers to Lyacos as one of "the possible future Nobel Prize winners (or at least as the only living Greek eligible)" and considers the work in its entirety with its the games of references, the insistence on certain themes and images as entirely programmatic". Filippomaria Pontani in Il Sole 24 Ore claims that the author "aims to investigate the biological origins of evil in society, with particular reference to exclusion and marginalisation, from the perspective of animal dynamics" and compares Lyacos' approach to the cinema of Stanley Kubrick and Yorgos Lanthimos.

Poena Damni has received substantial critical attention internationally, with reviewers frequently noting its engagement with canonical Western texts alongside its unconventional formal approach. Most critics comment on the use of an intricate network of textual references and paraphrases of classical and biblical works, in tandem with the work's unconventional style and character. On a different note, one critic, pointed out that "despite it being beautifully written and heart-wrenching, the gruesome detail of some passages filled [her] with a sense of dread at the turning of every page" and issued a content warning for readers. In the light of the COVID-19 pandemic, Poena Damni has attracted attention as "a vertiginous work that is at once archetypal, transcendent, and uniquely suited to this particular moment in time".

== In other media ==
Various artists have brought Lyacos' work in different artistic media. Austrian artist Sylvie Proidl presented a series of paintings in 2002 in Vienna. In 2004, a sound and sculpture installation by sculptor Fritz Unegg and BBC producer Piers Burton-Page went on a European tour. In 2005 Austrian visual artist Gudrun Bielz presented a video-art work inspired by Nyctivoe. The Myia dance company performed a contemporary dance version of Nyctivoe in Greece from 2006 to 2009. A music/theatre version of Z213: Exit by Greek composers Maria Aloupi and Andreas Diktyopoulos, performed by Das Neue Ensemble and Greek actor Dimitris Lignadis was presented in 2013. Two contemporary classical music compositions inspired by the trilogy, "Night and Day in the Tombs"and "The Un-nailing of our Childhood Years", by The Asinine Goat were released in February and June 2022 respectively. American composer Gregory Rowland Evans composed a piece for Lyacos' Nyctivoe (ex-book II of the Poena Damni series) for violin and cello launched in December 2024 by the Antigone Music Collective

== Bibliography ==
- Poena Damni - German Edition. Translated by Nina-Maria Wanek. KLAK Verlag, Berlin 2020.
- Poena Damni - Italian Edition. Translated by Viviana Sebastio. Il Saggiatore, Milan 2022.
- Poena Damni - Portuguese/Brazilian Edition. Translated by Jose Luis Costa. Relicario Edicoes, Belo Horizonte, 2023.
- Poena Damni - Turkish Edition. Translated by Arzu Eker. Alpha Publishers, Istanbul, 2026 (forthcoming).
- Poena Damni Der erste Tod. German edition. Translated by Nina-Maria Wanek. Verlagshaus J. Frank. First edition 2008. Second edition 2014. ISBN 978-3-940249-85-2
- Poena Damni Nyctivoe. English edition. Translated by Shorsha Sullivan. Shoestring Press. 2005. ISBN 1-904886-11-6
- Poena Damni Nyctivoe. Greek - German edition. Translated by Nina-Maria Jaklitsch. CTL Presse. Hamburg. 2001.
- Poena Damni O Protos Thanatos. Odos Panos. Athens. 1996. ISBN 960-7165-98-5
- Poena Damni The First Death, Second Edition (Revised). Translated by Shorsha Sullivan. Shoestring Press, Nottingham 2017. ISBN 9781910323878
- Poena Damni The First Death. English edition. Translated by Shorsha Sullivan. Shoestring Press. 2000. ISBN 1-899549-42-0
- Poena Damni With the People from the Bridge, Second Edition (Revised). Translated by Shorsha Sullivan. Shoestring Press, Nottingham 2018. ISBN 9781910323915
- Poena Damni With the People from the Bridge. Translated by Shorsha Sullivan. Shoestring Press, Nottingham 2014. ISBN 978 1 910323 15 1
- Poena Damni Z213: Exit, French Edition. Translated by Michel Volkovitch. Le Miel des Anges, 2017. ISBN 9791093103235
- Poena Damni Z213: Exit, Second Edition (Revised). Translated by Shorsha Sullivan. Shoestring Press, Nottingham 2016. ISBN 9781910323625
- Poena Damni Z213: Exit. English edition. Translated by Shorsha Sullivan. Shoestring Press 2010. ISBN 978-1-907356-05-6
- Poena Damni Z213: ΕΞΟΔΟΣ. Greek Edition. Dardanos Publishers, Athens 2009. ISBN 960-402-356-X
- Poena Damni: The Trilogy. 3-Book Box Set Edition (English). Translated by Shorsha Sullivan. Shoestring Press, Nottingham 2018. ISBN 9781912524013
