= 0th =

0th or zeroth may refer to:

== Mathematics, science and technology ==
- 0th or zeroth, an ordinal for the number 0
- 0th dimension, a topological space
- 0th element, of a mathematical sequence or some data structure in computer science
- 0th law of Thermodynamics
- Zeroth (software), deep learning software for mobile devices

== Other uses ==
- 0th grade, another name for kindergarten
- January 0 or January 0th, an alternate name for December 31
- 0 Avenue, a road in British Columbia straddling the Canada-US border

== See also ==
- OTH (disambiguation) (with a letter O)
- Zeroth law (disambiguation)
- Zeroth-order (disambiguation)
