= Dionysus Aesymnetes =

Aesymnetes (Ancient Greek: Αἰσυμνήτης) was an epithet of the Greek god Dionysus, which signifies the "Lord", or "Ruler", and under which he was worshipped at Aroë in Achaea.

There was at Troy an ancient image of Dionysus, the work of Hephaestus, which Zeus had once given as a present to Dardamis. It was kept in a chest, and Cassandra, or, according to others, Aeneas, left this chest behind when she quit the city, because she knew that it would do injury to anyone who possessed it. When the Greeks divided the spoils of Troy among themselves, this chest fell to the share of the Thessalian Eurypylus, who on opening it suddenly fell into a state of madness. The oracle of Delphi, when consulted about his recovery, answered, "Where thou shalt see men performing a strange sacrifice, there shalt thou dedicate the chest, and there shalt thou settle."

When Eurypylus came to Aroë, it was just the season at which its inhabitants offered every year to Artemis Triclaria a human sacrifice, consisting of the fairest youth and the fairest maiden of the place. This sacrifice was offered as an atonement for a crime which had once been committed in the temple of the goddess. But an oracle had declared to them that they should be released from the necessity of making this sacrifice, if a foreign divinity should be brought to them by a foreign king. This oracle was now fulfilled. Eurypylus on seeing the victims led to the altar was cured of his madness and perceived that this was the place pointed out to him by the oracle; and the Aroeans also, on seeing the god in the chest, remembered the old prophecy, stopped the sacrifice, and instituted a festival of Dionysus Aesynmetes, for this was the name of the god in the chest. Nine men and nine women were appointed to attend to his worship. During one night of this festival a priest carried the chest outside the town, and all the children of the place, adorned, as formerly the victims used to be, with garlands of corn-ears, went down to the banks of the river Meilichius, which had before been called Ameilichius, hung up their garlands, purified themselves, and then put on other garlands of ivy, after which they returned to the sanctuary of Dionysus Aesymnetes.

This tradition, though otherwise very obscure, evidently points to a time when human sacrifices were abolished at Aroë by the introduction of a new worship. At Patrae in Achaea there was likewise a temple dedicated to Dionysus Aesymnetes.
