= I love XXX =

1994 play by Meng Jinghui

I love XXX is a 1994 Chinese play by the theater director and scriptwriter Meng Jinghui. The first of Meng's plays to be published in English, it was translated and directed by Claire Conceison. The cast is composed of 5 men and 3 women. In this play, Meng Jinghui uses repetition and word alteration to talk about historical events in a nostalgic and personal way. The majority of the sentences in his play start with the words "I love…" It premiered in Beijing on 26 December 1994 at the China Acrobat Troupe. In June 2013, almost 20 years later; Meng Jinghui brought I love XXX back to the stage using a new set of actors and two thirds of the original play. He updated it with current events and added more personal experiences and more puns.

== Life ==
The play was written in a dormitory in Central Academy of Drama while Meng and his friends Shi hang, Wang Xiaoli and Huang Jingang were playing a word name that started with the sentence "I love…". The play addresses China's ‘postsocialism’ as well as European and American events that happen during the 1900s than then carries away to eroticism. Meng's technique of abolishing both plot and characters made I love XXX focus more in the idea of the actors moves and voices. The show was represented by 8 actors and video projections which showed the lines instead of being voiced in some parts of the play. He also uses electronic music, dazzling lighting and creative stage settings to attract and impress his audience. Style Meng Jinghie has its own writing style called the ‘Mengstyle’ (Mengshi). He plays with politics as well as art. Rosella Ferrari calls his style ‘popavant garde’. Many authors try to imitate his style and his plays have been adapted in non-Chinese works.

== Synopsis and Interpretations ==
The play is set during China's revolutionary period. It talks about the history of China seen through the eyes of the "I" of the 20th century. It is created with over seven hundred sentences that begin with the sentence "I love". Stating sentences like "I love hygiene" that a character states while the other one states the opposite "I love NOT hygiene!". Verbal collage is a technique used throughout the play to create funny and ridiculous sentences used to talk about history. Meng also repeats some sentences throughout the play.

The play tells the story of Meng’s generation who was born in the 1960s in China, with the four parts chronicling their experiences of being born into the revolutionary storm of Maoist China and growing up with a strong sense of revolutionary mission, only to find out that everything that they used to cherish was a sham upon the end of the Cultural Revolution and the onset of the reform era. The spiritual plight of this generation was ingeniously enacted in a metatheatrical mime scene, in which the performers first mechanically repeat mundane daily routines and then switch roles to do the same things over and over again. At the center of the play is the sharp contrast and intense tension between their learned ideal and the sorry reality, which is why almost each line of “I love” can be taken at face value or ironically at the same time, and why Meng expresses both nostalgia for and mockery of China’s socialist past at once.

== Acts ==
Part One: The Less Said the Better The author sets of the play with the lines "I love light, I love and so there was light, I love you, I love and so there was you." These lines are repeated in Part One, Part Three and Part Four, the last part of the play. In Part One, he starts talking about reason why he loved the year 1900. He then talks about great masters who died, and stars that are born around the time. He addresses the audience for the first time, and the acknowledgement that he is talking about a play "I love making you watch a play, what a play that nothing can be done about" He then talked about the top ten world event of 1900. Which include:

1. World's Fair that opens in Paris. 2. New York City Mayor Van Wyck opening the Rapid Transit Tunnel. 3. The Eight Nation Alliance that invades Beijing. 4. The invention of the Browning Pistol. The invention of the Nobel Prize by Swedish scientist Alfred Nobel. The invention of Tango by someone named Tango. 5. Ohio state's law prohibiting college upperclassmen from hazing freshman. 6. Announcement made in Barcelona by a group of medical doctors in which they say that X-rays can be used for effective treatment for great cancer and the increase of milk production. 7. Massive assembly line calling for the reinstatement of polygamy in Greece due to the increase of homosexual male population. 8. High brow art in Paris while Madame Butterfly is being represented in Shanghai. Meanwhile, politicians are engaging in ‘peachy’ sex scandals in European countries. 9. Killing of seventy eight demonstrators in Paris due to confusion between ‘open the road’ and ‘open the fire’. 10. First Romeo and Juliet is staged in London. Opera of Romeo and Juliet staged in Paris. Ballet of Romeo and Juliet staged in Warsaraw.

Part Two (Surtitles) The author talks about important wars, massacres battles and catastrophes that happened in the 1900s, referring to them as if they "didn’t happen". There are stage directions about the song Revolution by The Beatles being played during a blackout that happens on stage. The author then talks about the Great North East Blackout and the Birth Control Battalion that happens in Beijing.

Part three: Better Said than Sung The authors talks about things that happened when he was born. At first all the things are related to politics and then he talks about his personal likes such as "good manners or studying." He then lists stories and poems he likes. After that he talked about places in Beijing he likes like "Beijing’s Chang’an Avenue or Beijing’s Friendship Store." He talks about the fusion of movements with realism such as "expressionism and realism or symbolism and realism" and literature, He finishes Part Three talking about collective dance and introduces the idea of love while he describes parts of a woman's body he likes in an erotic way.

Part Four: No Sooner Said than Done The author addresses the audience again and starts mentioning famous figures and their lovers that he likes such as John Lennon and Yoko Ono, or Mr. Rochester and Jane Eyre. He then goes back again to mentioning things that he personally loves and introduces the idea of loving people, things and ideas who have "had enough." Then he talks about loving things that "crash into the ground." Finally he addresses the audience again telling them things he love about them. He ends up the play saying "I love the stage, I love and so there was the stage, I love leaving, I love and so there was leaving."

== Production history ==
December 9, 2015 MIT Kresge Little Theatre (W16).Boston, MA. United States Translated and directed by Claire Conceison. Performed by MIT students. June 2013 Beijing. Directed by Meng Jinghui. August 1995. Tiny Alice Festival, Tokyo. Directed by Meng Jinghui. December 26, 1994 China Acrobat Troupe, Beijing. Directed by Meng Jinghui.
