= John Lucas (poet) =

British poet, critic and biographer (1937–2025)

- Born: 26 June 1937; Exeter, England, United Kingdom
- Died: September 2025 (aged 88)
- Occupations: Poet, critic, biographer, and novelist
- Notable work: 92 Acharnon Street
- Awards: Dolman Best Travel Book Award

John Lucas (26 June 1937 – September 2025) was a British poet, critic, biographer, anthologist and literary historian. He ran a poetry publisher called Shoestring Press, and he was the author of 92 Acharnon Street (Eland, 2007), which won the Dolman Best Travel Book Award in 2008.

== Life and career ==
Lucas was born in Exeter, Devon, England, on 26 June 1937. He taught English at universities throughout the world, and was Professor Emeritus at the Universities of Loughborough and Nottingham Trent. Lucas wrote and translated over 40 books, including critical studies of Dickens, John Clare, and Arnold Bennett, books on English poetry, an anthology of the works of Nancy Cunard, as well as a life of his maternal grandfather, which combines biography with social history. In 2010, Lucas published Next Year Will Be Better: A Memoir of England in the 1950s. From 2011, Lucas also wrote several novels, including Waterdrops (2011).

His collections of poetry include Studying Grosz on the Bus, winner of the Aldeburgh Festival Poetry Prize, A World Perhaps: New & Selected Poems, Flute Music and Things to Say. He also edited an anthology, The Isles of Greece, for Eland. For over ten years he was poetry reviewer for the New Statesman. His most recent books include A World Perhaps: New and Selected Poems, The Radical Twenties: Writing, Politics, Culture, and The Good That We Do.

Lucas played jazz cornet and trumpet with the Nottingham-based Burgundy Street Jazzmen. In 1994, he founded Shoestring Press.

Lucas died in September 2025, at the age of 88.

== Bibliography ==
- Tradition and Tolerance in Nineteenth-century Fiction: critical essays on some English and American novels (with David Howard and John Goode), 1966
- A Selection from George Crabbe (as editor), 1967
- The Melancholy Man: a study of Dickens's novels, 1970
- About Nottingham: twelve poems, 1971
- Literature and Politics in the Nineteenth Century: essays (as editor), 1971
- A Brief Bestiary: Poems, 1972
- Arnold Bennett, a study of his fiction, 1974
- Literature of Change: Studies in the Nineteenth-century provincial novel, 1977
- The 1930s: A Challenge to Orthodoxy (as editor), 1978
- Mansfield Park by Jane Austen (editor), 1980
- Poems of G. S. Fraser (edited with Ian Fletcher), 1981
- Romantic to modern literature: essays and ideas of culture, 1750–1900, 1982
- The Days of the Week (poems), 1982
- Moderns and Contemporaries: novelists, poets, critics, 1985
- The Trent Bridge Battery: the story of the sporting Gunns (with Basil Haynes)
- Egil's saga (translator, with Christine Fell), 1985
- Modern English Poetry from Hardy to Hughes, 1986
- Selected Writings: Oliver Goldsmith (as editor), 1988
- Studying Grosz on the Bus (poems), 1989
- England and Englishness: ideas of nationhood in English poetry, 1688–1900, 1990
- D. H. Lawrence: Selected Poetry and Non-Fictional Prose (as editor) 1990
- Charles Dickens: the Major Novels, 1992
- Flying to Romania, 1992
- New Lines from Leicestershire: a verse anthology (as editor), 1992
- John Clare, 1994
- Writing and Radicalism (as editor), 1996
- The Radical Twenties, 1997
- One For the Piano: Poems, 1998
- For John Clare: An Anthology of Verse, 1997
- Robert Bloomfield: Selected Poems (as editor, with John Goodridge), 1998
- William Blake, 1998
- Stanley Middleton at Eighty (as editor, with David Belbin),1998
- On the Track (poems), 2000
- Ivor Gurney, 2001
- Starting to Explain: essays on twentieth century British and Irish poetry, 2003
- The Long and the Short of it, 2004
- A World Perhaps: New and Selected Poems, 2004
- Poetry: the Nottingham Collection (as editor), 2005
- Poems of Nancy Cunard: from the Bodleian Library (as editor), 2005
- The Winter's Tale, 2005
- Flute Music (poems), 2006
- 92 Acharnon Street: A Year in Athens, 2007
- Shakespeare's Second Tetralogy: Richard II - Henry V, 2007
- I, the poet Egil : versions of the poems of Egil's saga, 2008
- Harry Chambers & Peterloo Poets: 37 years of poetry publishing, 2009
- Shoestring's Commons (as editor), 2009
- All My Eye & Betty Martin, 2010
- The Isles of Greece: a collection of the poetry of place, 2010
- Next Year Will Be Better: A Memoir of England in the 1950s, 2010
- Things to Say, 2010
- Waterdrops (novel), 2011
- Second World War Poetry in English, 2013
- A Brief History of Whistling (with Allan Chatburn), 2015
- Portable Property, 2015
- The Awkward Squad: rebels in English cricket, 2015
- Ten Poems About Nottingham (as editor), 2015
- The Plotting (novel), 2016
- Summer Nineteen Forty-Five (novel), 2017
- Julia (novel), 2019
- Remembered Acts (novel), 2020
- The Life in Us (novel), 2021
- Closing Time at the Royal Oak (memoir), 2021
- That Little Thread (novel), 2023
