= Robert Langdon (franchise) =

American film franchise

- Official home release artwork for the film trilogy
- Directed by: Ron Howard
- Based on: Robert Langdon novels by Dan Brown
- Starring: Tom Hanks (See list below)
- Production companies: Columbia Pictures; Imagine Entertainment; Universal Television (The Lost Symbol); CBS Studios (The Lost Symbol)
- Distributed by: Sony Pictures Releasing
- Country: United States
- Language: English
- Budget: $350 million
- Box office: $1,46 billion

Robert Langdon is a media franchise that consists of American action-adventure mystery-thriller installments, including three theatrical films directed by Ron Howard, and a television series. The films, based on the novel series written by Dan Brown, center on the fictional character of Robert Langdon. Though based on the book series, the films have a different chronological order, consisting of: The Da Vinci Code (2006), Angels & Demons (2009), and Inferno (2016), all starring Tom Hanks as Langdon, alongside different ensemble casts. Despite mixed-to-negative critical reception, the films are considered box office successes, having a combined gross total of $1.5 billion worldwide.

The television series, a contemporary-prequel titled The Lost Symbol (2021), starring Ashley Zukerman as Langdon, explores the early years of Langdon's career.

== Development ==
Dan Brown's novels about Professor Robert Langdon: Angels & Demons (2000), The Da Vinci Code (2003), and Inferno (2013), quickly became international bestsellers; they were soon adapted into films by Columbia Pictures with Ron Howard directing and producing.

== Films ==
Film	U.S. release date	Director	Screenwriter(s)	Producer(s)
The Da Vinci Code	May 19, 2006	Ron Howard	Akiva Goldsman	John Calley & Brian Grazer
Angels & Demons	May 15, 2009	Ron Howard	David Koepp & Akiva Goldsman	Ron Howard, John Calley & Brian Grazer
Inferno	October 28, 2016	Ron Howard	David Koepp	Ron Howard & Brian Grazer

== Television ==
Series	Season	Episodes	Originally released			Showrunner(s)
Series	Season	Episodes	First released	Last released	Network	Showrunner(s)
The Lost Symbol	1	10	September 16, 2021	November 18, 2021	Peacock	Dan Dworkin & Jay Beattie
The Secret of Secrets	1	TBA	TBA	TBA	Netflix	Carlton Cuse

=== The Lost Symbol ===
Following the worldwide successes of the first two films, Columbia Pictures began development on a film adaptation of The Lost Symbol. Hanks and Howard were scheduled to return as star and director, with Brian Grazer and John Calley as producers, while a script was collectively co-written by Steven Knight, original author Dan Brown, and Danny Strong. By January 2013, the final draft of the script was near completion, with pre-production expected to start later that year. In July 2013, Sony Pictures announced they would adapt Inferno as the next film instead.

In June 2019, the project was announced to be re-conceived as a television series tentatively titled Langdon. The series serves as a prequel to the film series, with Daniel Cerone serving as creator, showrunner, chief executive producer, and screenwriter. Dan Brown, Ron Howard, Brian Grazer, Francie Calfo, Samie Falvey and Anna Culp will act as additional executive producers. The show was a co-production between Imagine Television Studios, CBS Television Studios, and Universal Television Studios and was ordered to series on NBC.

The plot revolves around a young Robert Langdon, who is hired by the CIA to solve a number of deadly puzzles when his mentor goes missing. By March 2020, Ashley Zukerman had been cast in the lead role. Later that month it was announced that the production had been given a series order and would be moving to Peacock. The show premiered on September 16, 2021, concluded on November 18, 2021, and was officially canceled after one season on January 24, 2022.

=== The Secret of Secrets ===
It was announced in May 2025 that Netflix had picked up a series adaptation of The Secret of Secrets with Carlton Cuse serving as showrunner. Cuse and Brown are set to executive produce the series. In July 2026, it was reported that the series would star Morgan Spector as Robert Langdon and Rebecca Hall as Katherine Solomon.

== Cast and characters ==
List indicators

This section includes characters who will appear or have appeared in the series.

- An empty grey cell indicates the character was not in the film, or that the character's official presence has not yet been confirmed.
- ^{Y} indicates a younger version of the character.

Character	Film			Television
Character	The Da Vinci Code	Angels & Demons	Inferno	The Lost Symbol
Prof. Robert Langdon	Tom Hanks Uncredited actor^{Y}	Tom Hanks	Tom Hanks	Ashley Zukerman
Sophie Neveu	Audrey Tautou Garance Mazureck,^{Y} Daisy Doidge-Hill,^{Y} Lilli Ella Kelleher^{Y}			
Sir Leigh Teabing The Teacher	Ian McKellen			
Bishop Manuel Aringarosa	Alfred Molina			
Capt. Bezu Fache	Jean Reno			
André Vernet	Jürgen Prochnow			
Silas	Paul Bettany Hugh Mitchell^{Y}			
Jacques Saunière	Jean-Pierre Marielle			
Remy Jean	Jean-Yves Berteloot			
Father Patrick McKenna		Ewan McGregor		
Dr. Vittoria Vetra		Ayelet Zurer		
Cdr. Maximilian Richter		Stellan Skarsgård		
Cardinal Strauss		Armin Mueller-Stahl		
Lt. Chartrand		Thure Lindhardt		
Dr. Sienna Brooks			Felicity Jones	
Christoph Bouchard			Omar Sy	
Bertrand Zobrist			Ben Foster	
Elizabeth Sinskey			Sidse Babett Knudsen	
Harry Sims The Provost			Irrfan Khan	
Peter Solomon				Eddie Izzard
Isabel Solomon				Laura De Carteret
Katherine Solomon				Valorie Curry
Zachary Solomon				Keenan Jolliff
Mal'akh				Beau Knapp
Ofc. Alfonso Nuñez				Rick Gonzalez
DoS/CIA Inoue Sato				Sumalee Montano

== Additional crew and production details ==
Film / Television	Composer	Cinematographer	Editors	Production companies	Distributing companies	Running time
The Da Vinci Code	Hans Zimmer	Salvatore Totino	Dan Hanley & Mike Hill	Columbia Pictures, Imagine Entertainment, Skylark Productions, Government of Malta	Sony Pictures Releasing	2hr 28min
Angels & Demons	Hans Zimmer	Salvatore Totino	Dan Hanley & Mike Hill	Columbia Pictures, Imagine Entertainment, Skylark Productions, Panorama Film Studios	Sony Pictures Releasing	2hr 18min
Inferno	Hans Zimmer	Salvatore Totino	Dan Hanley & Tom Elkins	Columbia Pictures, Imagine Entertainment, LSG Productions, LS Capital Film Corporation, Mid Atlantic Films	Sony Pictures Releasing	2hr 1min
The Lost Symbol	Will Bates	Gyula Pados, Fraser Brown, Boris Mojsovski, and David Greene	David Trachtenberg, Greg Sirota, Mark J. Goldman, Alexander Aquino-Kaljakin, and Juan Carlos Garza	Universal Television, Imagine Television Studios, Peacock Original Series, CBS Studios, Dworkin/Beattie Productions	Peacock	5hr 30min (approx. 40 min per episode)

== Reception ==
=== Box office performance ===
Film	Box office gross				Box office ranking		Budget	Ref(s)
Film	Opening weekend (North America)	North America	Other territories	Worldwide	All time North America	All time worldwide	Budget	Ref(s)
The Da Vinci Code	$77,073,388	$217,536,138	$583,813,720	$801,349,858	#146	#114	$125 million	
Angels & Demons	$46,204,168	$133,375,846	$352,554,970	$485,930,816	#390	#170	$150 million	
Inferno	$14,860,425	$34,343,574	$185,677,685	$220,021,259	#2,244	#586	$75 million	
	Total	$385,255,558	$1,122,046,375	$1,507,301,933			$350 million	

=== Critical and public response ===
Film / Television	Rotten Tomatoes	Metacritic	CinemaScore
The Da Vinci Code	25% (231 reviews)	46 (40 reviews)	B+
Angels & Demons	36% (258 reviews)	48 (36 reviews)	B+
Inferno	23% (254 reviews)	42 (47 reviews)	B+
The Lost Symbol	60% (15 reviews)	57 (6 reviews)	—N/a
