= The Translators =

2019 film

- Directed by: Régis Roinsard
- Starring: Lambert Wilson; Olga Kurylenko; Riccardo Scamarcio; Sidse Babett Knudsen; Eduardo Noriega; Alex Lawther; Anna Maria Sturm; Frédéric Chau; Maria Leite; Manolis Mavromatakis; Sara Giraudeau
- Cinematography: Guillaume Schiffman
- Music by: Jun Miyake
- Production company: Tresor Films
- Release dates: 23 November 2019 (Les Arcs Film Festival); 29 January 2020 (France)
- Running time: 105 minutes
- Countries: France, Belgium
- Language: French
- Budget: $10.6 million
- Box office: $3.1 million

The Translators (French: Les Traducteurs) is a 2019 Franco-Belgian mystery thriller film directed by Régis Roinsard. The plot was inspired by the experience of the simultaneous translators in 2013 of Dan Brown's novel Inferno.

== Plot ==
The publication of the last part of the globally successful book trilogy Dedalus is imminent. In order to ensure a smooth start without data leaks or spoilers, the translation of the book is to be carried out in complete isolation and under strict security precautions. The nine translators, who represent the countries where "Dedalus" sells the best, are therefore taken to a bunker to translate the book into their respective languages. Since the identity of the successful author Oscar Brach himself is unknown, the translation project is managed and carried out by his publisher Éric Angstrom. The translators receive only small sections of the secret book each day, which are to be translated gradually. After just a few days, however, the first ten pages are published on the Internet by an unknown person. In addition, Angstrom receives a ransom note with a demand for five million euros in order to prevent the publication of further pages. As a result, Angstrom continues to put pressure on the translators and terrorize them in the hope of identifying the blackmailer. This leads to growing mistrust within the group, along with Angstrom pushing the group members individually, which then results in the suicide of the Danish translator Helene.

Meanwhile, through flashbacks, the viewer learns of the English translator Alex Goodman's plan to steal the manuscript. To do this, he teams up with some of his fellow translators and seems to have stolen and copied the book from Angstrom even before the start of the translation project.

As more and more pages of the book are published, the situation in the bunker escalates more and more, and when Angstrom shoots Goodman and Katerina, the Russian translator, the previously loyal security forces also turn against the publisher, who is then arrested. Goodman visits the prisoner some time later and reveals to him his identity as Oscar Brach. In protest against Angstrom's methods and greed, the successful author has himself mingled with the translators in order to expose Angstrom. During this conversation, Goodman also reveals that the bookseller, Georges, whom Angstrom killed after he refused to continue working with him, was actually a close friend of Goodman's. Goodman had met him as a child and later showed him his work, "Dedalus", agreeing to publish it only if Georges pretended to be the author.

Due to the confession and other events, Angstrom remains in prison. Goodman's true identity is thus secured and the murder of Georges is avenged.

== Cast ==
- Lambert Wilson: Éric Angstrom, the publisher
- Alex Lawther: Alex Goodman, the English translator
- Olga Kurylenko: Katerina Anisinova, the Russian translator
- Riccardo Scamarcio: Dario Farelli, the Italian translator
- Sidse Babett Knudsen: Helene Tuxen, the Danish translator
- Eduardo Noriega: Javier Casal, the Spanish translator
- Anna Maria Sturm: Ingrid Korbel, the German translator
- Frédéric Chau: Chen Yao, the Chinese translator
- Maria Leite: Telma Alves, the Portuguese translator
- Manolis Mavromatakis: Konstantinos Kedrinos, the Greek translator
- Sara Giraudeau: Rose-Marie Houeix, Éric Angstrom's assistant
- Patrick Bauchau: Georges Fontaine, the bookseller
- Sergueï Nesterenko: Marat
- Ilya Nikitenko: Ivan
- Miglen Mirtchev: Sergei
- Michel Bompoil: Robert Monteil
- Nicolas Koretzky: Philippe Arthur
- Vinciane Millereau: Carole Bauer
- Jade Phan-Gia: Lucie Smadja
- Marc Arnaud: Paul Sierra
- Irina Muluile: Inspector Camara
- Stéphane Pézerat: Inspector Pulaski
- Kester Lovelace: British inspector
- Jacob Hauberg Lohmann: Helene Tuxen's husband
- Alasdair Noble: young Alex Goodman
- Suzana Joaquim Mausdlay: Lisbon Airport attendant

== Production ==
The Translators (in French, Les Traducteurs) in the thriller genre, also described as a "whodunnit". It was directed by Régis Roinsard.

The plot was inspired by the simultaneous translation operation of Dan Brown's Inferno in 2013, which was conceived to prevent leaking and "guarantee the simultaneous publication of the novel worldwide". The translators were divided into two groups and worked from Milan and London respectively.

The film was produced by Tresor Productions, and co-produced by eight other French and Belgian production companies, in partnership with various television networks and other funding sources.

== Release ==
The Translators had its world premiere at the 11th edition of Les Arcs Film Festival on 23 November 2019, before being released in French cinemas on 29 January 2020. It was distributed in France by Trésor Cinéma and Mars Films, and in the Benelux countries by O'Brother Distribution.

The film was released in Australian cinemas on 17 September 2020.

== Reception ==
The film scored 71% on review aggregator Rotten Tomatoes, based on 17 reviews.

On its Australian release, renowned film critic Margaret Pomeranz gave the film 4 stars out of 5, calling it "Clever and very enjoyable... Funny and so intricately and ingeniously plotted", and praised the performances. David Stratton, film critic for The Weekend Australian, wrote: "A tasty, twisty suspense movie that keeps you guessing through its taut running time. So well directed and photographed, the extravagant plot is engagingly packaged". A review in the Law Society Journal gave it three stars, calling it "good enthralling storytelling".

== Trivia ==
In 2017, the same operation was repeated for the translation of Origin, the fifth book in the Robert Langdon series, with 26 translators working together in Barcelona.
