= Robert Langdon (novel series) =

Novel series by Dan Brown

The Robert Langdon novel series is named after Robert Langdon, the protagonist of the novels by American author Dan Brown. Langdon is portrayed as a Harvard University professor of religious iconology and symbology, a fictional field related to the study of historic symbols, which is not methodologically connected to the actual discipline of semiotics. Brown's novels that feature the lead character also include historical themes and Christianity as motifs, and as a result have generated controversy. Brown states on his website that his novels are not anti-Christian, and that he is on a "constant spiritual journey" himself.

== Novels of the series ==
No.	Title	Publication date	ISBN
1	Angels & Demons	May 1, 2000	978-0-593-05504-5
When physicist Leonardo Vetra is murdered and branded with the word Illuminati, his boss, CERN director Maximilian Kohler, asks Harvard symbologist Robert Langdon for help. Meeting Vetra's daughter, Vittoria, Langdon learns that the Illuminati, an ancient anti-religious sect, plan to destroy Vatican City with an antimatter canister invented by Vetra refashioned as a weapon. Arriving during the election of the new Pope, the two follow a secret trail to find the group's lair and stop them.
2	The Da Vinci Code	March 18, 2003	978-0-307-47427-8
When the curator of the Louvre, Jacques Saunière, is murdered, circumstantial evidence leaves Robert Langdon as the prime suspect. Joined by Saunière's granddaughter, Sophie Neveu, he seeks to prove his innocence by following a trail left by the secret organization Saunière was part of and discovers a shocking secret dating back to the time of Christ.
3	The Lost Symbol	September 15, 2009	978-0-385-50422-5
Robert Langdon arrives in Washington DC at the behest of his mentor, Freemason Peter Solomon, only to find that he's been kidnapped. Joined by his old flame and Solomon's sister, Katherine, Langdon follows a trail of clues that leads him deep into the secrets of the Masons, whose members include Solomon's tattooed kidnapper.
4	Inferno	May 14, 2013	978-0-385-53785-8
Robert Langdon wakes up in a hospital in Florence, Italy with a head wound and no memory of the last few days. When an assassin shows up in the hospital and attempts to kill Langdon, Dr. Sienna Brooks helps him escape and discover what had happened during those missing days by following clues involving Dante's Inferno.
5	Origin	October 3, 2017	978-0-593-07875-4
Robert Langdon is invited to the Guggenheim museum in Spain to attend an event held by famous futurist and former student Edmond Kirsch, who has made a discovery he claims will change the way people view religion forever. When Kirsch is murdered before his announcement, Langdon attempts to uncover and release his secret before it's lost forever, leading him into conflict with those who would prevent the release, including members of Spain's Royal family.
6	The Secret of Secrets	September 9, 2025	978-0-385-54689-8
While in Prague to attend a lecture held by his girlfriend, Katherine Solomon, on noetic science and the human consciousness, Robert Langdon gets mixed up in a series of bizarre incidents involving numerous people who will stop at nothing to keep Katherine's new manuscript on her latest controversial findings from being published.

== Reception ==
The series has sold over 120 million copies.

== Adaptations ==
=== Film series ===
The novels were a success around the world and became bestsellers, and soon adapted into films in which Ron Howard directed and produced 3 of 6 novels: The Da Vinci Code (2006), Angels & Demons (2009), and Inferno (2016), with Tom Hanks portraying the lead character, Professor Robert Langdon. All three were released by Columbia Pictures.

=== Television series ===
The novel The Lost Symbol was adapted in 2021 by Peacock with Ashley Zukerman playing the lead character, Professor Robert Langdon. The series has 1 season containing 10 episodes. In January 2022, Peacock canceled the show after only 1 season, which will continue to be available for streaming.

It was announced in May 2025 that Netflix had picked up an adaptation of the upcoming novel The Secret of Secrets with a straight-to-series order with Brown and Carlton Cuse as producers. Morgan Spector has been cast as Langdon.
