= The Lost Symbol (TV series) =

American action-adventure television series

- Also known as: Dan Brown's The Lost Symbol
- Genre: Action adventure; Mystery; Thriller
- Based on: The Lost Symbol by Dan Brown
- Developed by: Dan Dworkin; Jay Beattie
- Starring: Ashley Zukerman; Eddie Izzard; Valorie Curry; Beau Knapp; Rick Gonzalez; Sumalee Montano
- Music by: Will Bates
- Country of origin: United States
- Original language: English
- No. of seasons: 1
- No. of episodes: 10

Production
- Executive producers: Dan Dworkin; Jay Beattie; Brian Grazer; Ron Howard; Dan Brown; Samie Kim Falvey; Anna Culp; Frank Siracusa; John Weber; Dan Trachtenberg
- Producers: Norman Denver; O'Shea Read; Todd Aronauer
- Production locations: Toronto, Ontario
- Cinematography: Gyula Pados; Fraser Brown; Boris Mojsovski; David Greene; Dylan Macleod
- Editors: David Trachtenberg; Greg Sirota; Mark J. Goldman; Alexander Aquino-Kaljakin; Juan Carlos Garza
- Running time: 40–51 minutes
- Production companies: Universal Television; Imagine Television Studios; CBS Studios; Dworkin/Beattie

Original release
- Network: Peacock
- Release: September 16 – November 18, 2021

Dan Brown's The Lost Symbol, or simply The Lost Symbol, is an American action adventure mystery thriller television series based on the 2009 novel The Lost Symbol by Dan Brown. The series is a prequel to the Robert Langdon film series and features Ashley Zukerman as symbologist Robert Langdon. It also stars Eddie Izzard, Beau Knapp, Rick Gonzalez, Valorie Curry and Sumalee Montano in main roles. The series, consisting of ten episodes, premiered on September 16, 2021, on Peacock. In January 2022, the series was cancelled after one season.

== Plot ==
A young Robert Langdon is recruited by the CIA to help solve a number of deadly puzzles when his mentor goes missing.

== Cast ==
=== Main ===
- Ashley Zukerman as Robert Langdon, a Harvard professor of symbology
- Eddie Izzard as Peter Solomon, Langdon's academic mentor
- Valorie Curry as Dr Katherine Solomon, Peter's daughter and noetic scientist
- Beau Knapp as Mal'akh, a mysterious antagonist
- Rick Gonzalez as Alfonso Nuñez, a Capitol police officer
- Sumalee Montano as Inoue Sato, director of the CIA's office of security

=== Recurring ===
- Raoul Bhaneja as Nicholas Bastin, the "Janitor"
- Laura De Carteret as Isabel Solomon, Peter's wife
- Keenan Jolliff as Zachary Solomon, Peter's son
- Sammi Rotibi as Agent Adamu, a Nigerian-born CIA operative
- Tyrone Benskin as Warren Bellamy, a Freemason and the Architect of the Capitol
- Greg Bryk as Ellison Blake, a CIA officer
- Steve Cumyn as Jonathan Knopp
- Mark Gibbon as Samyaza

== Episodes ==
No.	Title	Directed by	Teleplay by	Original release date
1	"As Above, So Below"	Dan Trachtenberg	Dan Dworkin & Jay Beattie	September 16, 2021
When renowned symbologist Robert Langdon is summoned to Washington, D.C., he discovers that his mentor, Peter Solomon, has been abducted. The kidnapper, a mysterious figure known as Mal'akh, severs Peter’s hand and forces Langdon to help uncover the secrets of Freemasonry, starting in the Capitol. With the help of Katherine Solomon, Langdon must unravel a series of clues and ancient symbols hidden throughout the city to rescue his friend.
2	"The Araf"	Mathias Herndl	Dan Dworkin & Jay Beattie	September 23, 2021
Langdon and Solomon are pursued by the CIA but receive assistance from Warren Bellamy, affiliated with a group of covert guardians named Leviathan. Bellamy involves Alfonso Nuñez, and together they recover Peter Solomon's Freemason ring, which contains a coded message left by him. The CIA eventually locates the group and detains Bellamy, who enables Langdon and Solomon to leave unnoticed. Mal'akh later contacts Langdon and informs him that he can no longer work with Solomon.
3	"Murmuration"	Mathias Herndl	David H. Goodman	September 30, 2021
Langdon and Solomon continue their search while being pursued by the CIA. Using gematria, he uncovers a clue to a hidden burial site connected to a Freemason, Ezra Dove. The investigation also reveals more about Leviathan's secretive operations (including a film of a murmuration) and the hidden powers involved. Solomon's assistant, Trish, oblivious to the warnings from Mal'akh, is later found murdered and displayed on a triskelion.
4	"L'Enfant Orientation"	Felix Alcala	Sallie Patrick	October 7, 2021
Langdon visits Wiggington Quarry, Pierre L'Enfant's source of sandstone for many of the important early buildings in Washington, and in a tunnel uses a relic to release the capstone. Meanwhile, Solomon, shocked by the murder, returns home and begins searching for clues in her father's study, and is helped by CIA Agent Sato to contact a noetic scientist. Mal'akh, aided by his assistant, continues to drug and torture his prisoner.
5	"Melencolia I"	Felix Alcala	Brusta Brown & John Mitchell Todd	October 14, 2021
Back at the house, Nuñez notices an apparent date on the capstone box, 1514AD, which Langdon interprets as Melencholia I, the artwork of Albrecht Dürer. Sato continues her deception of supporting Langdon by helping him try to visit the artwork. Mal'ahk sends a video proving that Peter is still alive. Sato then proposes an attempt to trap Mal'akh but it backfires when Langdon is captured and imprisoned.
6	"Diophantine Pseudonym"	Kate Woods	Carlos Foglia	October 21, 2021
Sato is stood down for her unauthorised role in the bungled rescue attempt. Desiring to help, she gives Solomon letters from Zachary and reveals her past link to him. Sato contacts a Leviathan operative seeking to recover the artefacts in return for his help. Meanwhile, Langdon and Peter Solomon are reunited and uncover a rose cross in the capstone box before being rescued. Mal'akh reveals himself as Zachary before escaping.
7	"Noögenesis"	Boris Mojsovski	Lauren Conn	October 28, 2021
Leviathan agents quickly track and capture Zachary, and he asks to meet Sato. The show then jumps back in time to Zachary's imprisonment and Langdon's developing romance with Solomon. Zachary is trapped between political forces inside and outside the prison, leading him to seek a transformation with a spiritual mentor and reject his father's offer of help. As in the past, he escapes captivity again.
8	"Cascade"	Kate Woods	Andrew Saito	November 4, 2021
Sato recuperates in hospital after being attacked during the escape. The Leviathan systems are frozen through a virus introduced via Mal'akh's captured phone, and the group's executive meets in the Solomon house. They vote to meet Mal'akh's demands and deliver classified technology to him. Langdon and Solomon meet her mother and learn she has been secretly financing Zachary and escape as he returns and kills her in anger.
9	"Order Eight"	Norma Bailey	Glen Whitman	November 11, 2021
Mal'akh cremates his mother before going to a lake to test Cascade, the sonic device. Meanwhile, Solomon seeks to destroy the recovered pyramid while Langdon wishes to retain it. Following the next clue, they are joined by Peter and make an approach to the CIA for assistance. The base of the pyramid also hides a Franklin square leading them to the House of the Temple where Mal'akh reappears.
10	"Resonance"	Mathias Herndl	Dan Dworkin & Jay Beattie	November 18, 2021
Mal'akh is confronted by his former mentor, who is helping the CIA, but overcomes him in unarmed combat. He then takes Solomon to tunnels below the Washington Monument where he sets up the resonance device seeking apotheosis. Peter arrives, willing to die, but instead, Mal'akh wants to die sacrificially. Nuñez disrupts the device and Solomon stabs her brother as Langdon reveals the symbolic only nature of the entire quest.

== Production ==
=== Development ===
The series was originally developed as a film to have starred Tom Hanks as Robert Langdon and to be produced and directed by Ron Howard for Columbia Pictures, along with the franchise's producers Brian Grazer and John Calley. Between 2010 and 2013 Sony Pictures eventually hired three screenwriters for the project, Steven Knight, Dan Brown himself, and Danny Strong. In July 2013, Sony Pictures announced they would instead adapt Inferno for an October 14, 2016, release.

In June 2019, the project was announced to be re-conceived as a television series tentatively titled Langdon. The series serves as a prequel to the film series, with Dan Dworkin and Jay Beattie serving as co-creators, showrunners and executive producers. Brown, Howard, Brian Grazer, Samie Kim Falvey, and Anna Culp acted as additional executive producers. The show is a co-production between Imagine Television Studios, CBS Studios, and Universal Television Studios and was ordered to series on NBC. In March 2021, it was announced the series was picked up to series by Peacock. The new title of the series, Dan Brown's The Lost Symbol, was revealed on May 17, 2021, with a trailer for the series. The first episode was directed by Dan Trachtenberg, who also is an executive producer on the series.

On January 24, 2022, Peacock canceled the series after one season.

=== Casting ===
In March 2020 it was announced that Ashley Zukerman had been cast to portray Robert Langdon. In June 2020 it was announced that Valorie Curry and Eddie Izzard had been cast as Katherine and Peter Solomon. A few days later additional cast members were announced, Sumalee Montano as Sato, Rick Gonzalez as Nunez and Beau Knapp as Mal'akh. In June 2021, Raoul Bhaneja, Sammi Rotibi, and Keenan Jolliff were cast in recurring roles.

=== Filming ===
Principal photography for the first season of the series began on June 14, 2021, in Toronto, Ontario and concluded on October 20, 2021.

== Release ==
The series premiered on September 16, 2021, on Peacock. A collection of six posters, each featuring one of the main cast of the show, was released the day before the premiere. In India, the series was picked by Voot for streaming. In Hong Kong, TVB has carried the series for myTV Super, premiering simultaneously with the US broadcast. NBC also scheduled to broadcast the pilot episode on its network on November 8, making it the first Peacock original to be aired on the network as well.

== Reception ==
The review aggregator website Rotten Tomatoes reported a 50% approval rating with an average rating of 6.5/10, based on 12 critic reviews. The website's critics consensus reads, "With a promising premise, handsome locations, and a well-known character, The Lost Symbol has all the pieces necessary to be an addictive addition to Robert Langdon's story—if only the show's flat writing and strange pace didn't undermine all that potential." Metacritic gave the series a weighted average score of 53 out of 100 based on 5 critic reviews, indicating "mixed or average reviews".
