= Robert Langdon =

Fictional character

Professor Robert Langdon
- Tom Hanks as Robert Langdon in Angels & Demons
- First appearance: Angels & Demons (2000)
- Last appearance: The Secret of Secrets (2025)
- Created by: Dan Brown
- Portrayed by: Tom Hanks (film series); Ashley Zukerman (The Lost Symbol); Morgan Spector (The Secret of Secrets)
- Voiced by: Robert Clotworthy (The Da Vinci Code)

In-universe information
- Gender: Male
- Title: Professor
- Occupation: Professor of Religious Iconology and Symbology at Harvard University
- Family: Unnamed father (deceased)
- Relatives: Howard Langdon (great-grandfather)

Robert Langdon is a fictional character created by the American author Dan Brown for his Robert Langdon book series: Angels & Demons (2000), The Da Vinci Code (2003), The Lost Symbol (2009), Inferno (2013), Origin (2017), and The Secret of Secrets (2025). He is a Harvard University professor of religious iconology and symbology (a fictional field related to the study of historic symbols, which is not methodologically connected to the actual discipline of semiotics).

Tom Hanks portrays Langdon in the Robert Langdon film series; starting with the 2006 film adaptation of The Da Vinci Code, reprising the role in the 2009 film adaptation of Angels & Demons, and again in the 2016 film adaptation of Inferno, while Ashley Zukerman plays a younger version of the character in the 2021 TV series adaptation of The Lost Symbol. Morgan Spector is set to portray Langdon in the upcoming Netflix adaptation of The Secret of Secrets.

== Character development ==
Dan Brown created the character as a fictional alter ego of himself or "the man he wishes he could be". Brown himself was born June 22, 1964, in Exeter, New Hampshire, and the fictional Langdon is described as having been born on June 22, also in Exeter, and attending the same school as Brown did, Phillips Exeter Academy. Initially it is established that Langdon is a successful scholar whom Brown named after John Langdon, a professor of typography at Drexel University who is known for his creation of ambigrams. An example of Langdon's ambigrams appeared on the cover of the first edition of Brown's novel Angels & Demons, and other ambigrams featured throughout that novel were also designed by Langdon. On the acknowledgments page, Brown calls Langdon "one of the most ingenious and gifted artists alive … who rose brilliantly to my impossible challenge and created the ambigrams for this novel". John Langdon also created the logo for the fictitious Depository Bank of Zurich, which appears in The Da Vinci Code film. In an interview, Brown said that Joseph Campbell was an inspiration for the character of Langdon:

His writings on semiotics, comparative religion and mythology in particular "The Power of Myth" and "The Hero With a Thousand Faces" helped inspire the framework on which I built my character, Robert Langdon... I remember admiring Campbell's matter-of-fact responses and wanting my own character Langdon to project that same respectful understanding when faced with complex spiritual issues. — Dan Brown

== Storyline ==
Robert Langdon, born in Exeter, New Hampshire, United States, is described as looking like "Harrison Ford in Harris tweed", with his standard attire being a turtleneck, Harris tweed jacket, khakis, and collegiate cordovan loafers, which he wears in all instances, from lectures to social events. A frequently referred to accessory is his Mickey Mouse watch, a gift from his parents on his tenth birthday. He drives an automatic Saab 900S. Langdon was a diver at Phillips Exeter Academy in prep school and played water polo at Princeton University where he went for college. He suffers from claustrophobia, as he fell into a well when he was 7 years old. His father died when he was 12, and his new mentor father-figure became Peter Solomon, Secretary of the Smithsonian Institution.

Known for a brilliant problem-solving mind and his genius, Langdon has an eidetic memory. As professor at Harvard University, he teaches religious iconology and the fictional field of symbology. As a hobby, it is specifically mentioned that Langdon is a great swimmer and swam laps (50) daily, a "morning ritual", at Harvard's athletic facilities (hence the lap swimming scene in Angels & Demons). Langdon also mentions he was raised a Catholic, but that he will never understand God; in Angels & Demons, he mentions to the Camerlengo that faith is a gift he has yet to receive. In the books, the events of The Da Vinci Code follow those of Angels & Demons; this was reversed in the movies, where the latter's adaptation is written to be the sequel to the former.

=== Angels & Demons ===
In Angels & Demons, Robert Langdon is called to CERN headquarters in Switzerland to find about the religious symbological implications of the death of CERN's finest and best-known physicist, Leonardo Vetra, a Catholic priest who has been branded with the Illuminati symbol. When he starts to investigate the murder, his obsession with history comes into play. Langdon is later joined in the investigation by Vittoria Vetra (Leonardo's adopted daughter) and they start their journey to the Vatican to unlock the mystery behind the Illuminati, an anti-Catholic secret society which, according to the plot, has deeply infiltrated many global institutions, political, economical and religious. Langdon and Vetra solve the mystery of the Illuminati by following the Path of Illumination, and in so doing explain the disappearances of four Cardinals during a papal conclave, the murder of Leonardo Vetra, and the theft of antimatter (a substance that can be used for mass destruction). At the end of the novel, Langdon ends up having a relationship with Vittoria Vetra. In the last few sentences of Angels & Demons, Vittoria Vetra asks him if he has ever had a divine experience. When he replies in the negative, Vittoria slips off her terrycloth robe, saying, "You've never been to bed with a yoga master, have you?" Their relationship, however, is only referred to in The Da Vinci Code, mentioning the fact that Langdon had last seen Vittoria a year previously.

=== The Da Vinci Code ===
In the beginning of 2003's The Da Vinci Code, Robert Langdon is in Paris to give a lecture on his work. Having made an appointment to meet with Jacques Saunière, the curator of the Louvre, he is startled to find the French police at his hotel room door. They inform him that Saunière has been murdered and they would like his immediate assistance at the Louvre to help them solve the crime. Unknown to Langdon, he is in fact the prime suspect in the murder and has been summoned to the scene of the crime so that the police may extract a confession from him. While he is in the Louvre, he meets Sophie Neveu, a young cryptologist from the DCPJ. When Langdon and Sophie get the chance to talk in private, he finds out that Jacques Saunière is her grandfather. Saunière instructs Sophie to 'find Robert Langdon', according to the message he left for her in the floor. Hence, Sophie believes he is innocent of her grandfather's murder.

Langdon spends the rest of the novel dodging the police and trying to solve the mystery of an ancient secret society, the Priory of Sion, which was once headed by Leonardo da Vinci. At the end of the novel, Langdon uncovers the mystery behind Mary Magdalene and the Holy Grail also called Sangreal, derived from either the Spanish "San Greal" (the Holy Grail), or the French "Sang real" (royal blood). Slightly before the moment he discovers the final resting place of the Holy Grail, he is seen in a romantic light by Sophie Neveu, and two agree to meet again in Florence, where Langdon will be for a lecture. The two share a kiss after which, in the epilogue, Langdon unearths the mystery of the Sangreal.

=== The Lost Symbol ===
In The Lost Symbol, Langdon has an adventure with the concepts of Freemasonry in Washington, D.C. Tricked into visiting the nation's Capitol, Robert Langdon spends twelve hours racing through the monuments and buildings of the USA's forefathers, searching for the truth about the secret society of the Masons. Behind new doors lie secrets that promise to change the way people view science and politics, now threatened by Zachary Solomon, the renegade, estranged son of Robert Langdon's friend, Peter Solomon, who has himself been kidnapped by Zachary, now going by the name "Mal'akh". Robert Langdon is the last line of defense. With help from Katherine Solomon (Peter's sister), Warren Bellamy (the Architect of the Capitol) and Inoue Sato (the director of the Office of Security).

=== Inferno ===
In Inferno, Langdon wakes up in an Italian hospital with no memory of the events that led him to be in Italy. Soon he realizes that someone is trying to kill him. Langdon travels from Florence to Venice, and Istanbul with Doctor Sienna Brooks to prevent a biological attack by looking for a deadly virus that was planted by a client of a shadowy consulting group called The Consortium. In the course of this, Langdon must decipher clues employing allusions to the works of Sandro Botticelli, Giorgio Vasari and Dante Alighieri, the writer of Inferno, the first chapter of the epic poem The Divine Comedy, around which much of the plot revolves.

=== Origin ===
The fifth book in the series, Origin was released on October 3, 2017. Langdon arrives at the ultramodern Guggenheim Museum Bilbao to attend a major announcement—the unveiling of a discovery that "will change the face of science forever." The evening's host is Edmond Kirsch, a forty-year-old billionaire and futurist whose dazzling high-tech inventions and audacious predictions have made him a renowned global figure. Kirsch, who was one of Langdon's first students at Harvard two decades earlier, is about to reveal an astonishing breakthrough, one that will answer two of the fundamental questions of human existence. As the event begins, Langdon and several hundred guests find themselves captivated by an utterly original presentation, which Langdon realizes will be far more controversial than he ever imagined. But the meticulously orchestrated evening suddenly erupts into chaos, and Kirsch's precious discovery teeters on the brink of being lost forever. Reeling and facing an imminent threat, Langdon is forced into a desperate bid to escape Bilbao. With him is Ambra Vidal, the elegant museum director who worked with Kirsch to stage the provocative event. Together they flee to Barcelona on a perilous quest to locate a cryptic password that will unlock Kirsch's secret. Navigating the corridors of hidden history and extreme religion, Langdon and Vidal must evade an enemy whose power seems to emanate from Spain's Royal Palace itself, and who will stop at nothing to silence Edmond Kirsch. On a trail marked by modern art and enigmatic symbols, Langdon and Vidal uncover clues that ultimately bring them face-to-face with Kirsch's shocking discovery.

=== The Secret of Secrets ===
The sixth book in the series, The Secret of Secrets was released on September 9, 2025. While in Prague to attend a lecture by his girlfriend, Katherine Solomon, on noetic science and human consciousness, Robert Langdon gets mixed up in a series of dangerous incidents involving numerous people who will stop at nothing to keep Katharine's new manuscript on her latest controversial findings from being published.
