= Dan Brown =

American writer (born 1964)

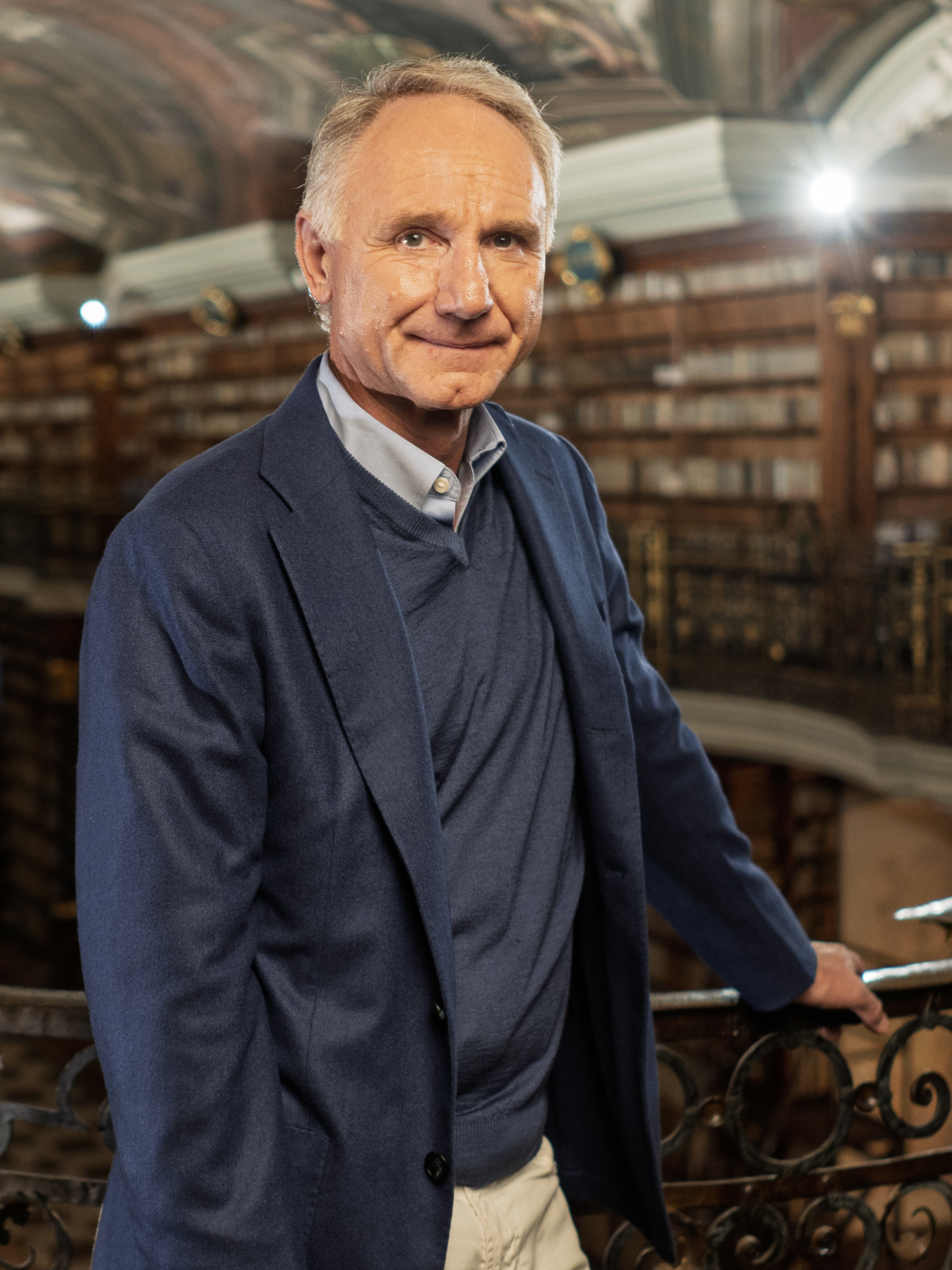
- Brown in 2025
- Born: Daniel Gerhard Brown; June 22, 1964 (age 62); Exeter, New Hampshire, U.S.
- Education: Amherst College (BA)
- Occupation: Novelist
- Spouse: Blythe Newlon (m. 1997; div. 2019)
- Relatives: Gregory W. Brown (brother)
- Writing career
- Genres: Thriller, adventure, mystery, conspiracy
- Notable works: Digital Fortress; Deception Point; Angels & Demons; The Da Vinci Code; The Lost Symbol; Inferno; Origin; The Secret of Secrets
- Website: danbrown.com

Daniel Gerhard Brown (born June 22, 1964) is an American writer best known for his thriller novels, particularly the Robert Langdon series Angels & Demons (2000), The Da Vinci Code (2003), The Lost Symbol (2009), Inferno (2013), Origin (2017) and The Secret of Secrets (2025). His novels are treasure hunts that usually take place over a 24-hour period and center on recurring themes of cryptography, art, and conspiracy theories.

Brown's books have been translated into 57 languages and have sold over 200 million copies as of 2012. Three of his works—Angels & Demons, The Da Vinci Code, and Inferno—have been adapted into films, while one—The Lost Symbol—was adapted into a 2021 television series.

The Robert Langdon novels deeply engage with Christian themes and explore history, and have subsequently generated controversy. Brown states on his website that his books are not anti-Christian and that he is on a "constant spiritual journey" himself. He states that his book The Da Vinci Code is "an entertaining story that promotes spiritual discussion and debate" and suggests that the book may be used "as a positive catalyst for introspection and exploration of our faith."

== Early life ==
Daniel Gerhard Brown was born on June 22, 1964, in Exeter, New Hampshire. He has a younger sister, Valerie (born 1968) and brother, Gregory (born 1974). Brown attended Exeter's public schools until the ninth grade. He grew up on the campus of Phillips Exeter Academy, where his father, Richard G. Brown, was a teacher of mathematics and wrote textbooks from 1968 until his retirement in 1997. His mother, Constance (née Gerhard), descended from Pennsylvania Dutch Schwenkfelders, and trained as a church organist and student of sacred music. Brown was raised an Episcopalian, and described his religious evolution in a 2009 interview:

I was raised Episcopalian, and I was very religious as a kid. Then, in eighth or ninth grade, I studied astronomy, cosmology, and the origins of the universe. I remember saying to a minister, "I don't get it. I read a book that said there was an explosion known as the Big Bang, but here it says God created heaven and Earth and the animals in seven days. Which is right?" Unfortunately, the response I got was, "Nice boys don't ask that question." A light went off, and I said, "The Bible doesn't make sense. Science makes much more sense to me." And I just gravitated away from religion.

When asked in the same interview about his then-current religious views, Brown replied:

The irony is that I've really come full circle. The more science I studied, the more I saw that physics becomes metaphysics and numbers become imaginary numbers. The further you go into science, the mushier the ground gets. You start to say, "Oh, there is an order and a spiritual aspect to science."

Brown's interest in secrets and puzzles stems from their presence in his household as a child, where codes and ciphers were the linchpin tying together the mathematics, music, and languages in which his parents worked. The young Brown spent hours working out anagrams and crossword puzzles, and he and his siblings participated in elaborate treasure hunts devised by their father on birthdays and holidays. On Christmas, for example, Brown and his siblings did not find gifts under the tree, but followed a treasure map with codes and clues throughout their house and even around town to find the gifts. Brown's relationship with his father inspired that of Sophie Neveu and Jacques Saunière in The Da Vinci Code, and Chapter 23 of that novel was inspired by one of his childhood treasure hunts.

In 1980, he spent the summer learning Spanish in Gijón (Spain), while living with a Spanish family. After graduating from Phillips Exeter, Brown attended Amherst College where he double majored in English and Spanish. At Amherst, he was initiated into the Psi Upsilon fraternity, along with Harlan Coben. He played squash, sang in the Amherst Glee Club, and was a writing student of visiting novelist Alan Lelchuk. Brown spent the 1985 school year in Seville, Spain, where he was enrolled in an art history course at the University of Seville. Brown graduated from Amherst in 1986.

== Career ==
=== Composer and singer ===
After graduating from Amherst, Brown dabbled with a musical career, creating effects with a synthesizer, and self-producing a children's cassette entitled SynthAnimals, which included a collection of tracks such as "Happy Frogs" and "Suzuki Elephants"; it sold a few hundred copies. He then formed his own record company called Dalliance, and in 1990 self-published a CD entitled Perspective, targeted to the adult market, which also sold a few hundred copies. In 1991 he moved to Hollywood to pursue a career as singer-songwriter and pianist. To support himself, he taught classes at Beverly Hills Preparatory School.

Brown joined the National Academy of Songwriters and participated in many of its events. It was there that he met his wife, Blythe Newlon, who was the academy's Director of Artist Development. Though it was not officially part of her job, she took on the seemingly unusual task of helping to promote Brown's projects; she wrote press releases, set up promotional events, and put him in contact with people who could be helpful to his career. She and Brown also developed a personal relationship, though this was not known to all of their associates until 1993, when Brown moved back to New Hampshire, and it was learned that Newlon would accompany him. They married in 1997, at Pea Porridge Pond, near Conway, New Hampshire. In 1994, Brown released a CD titled Angels & Demons. Its artwork was the same ambigram by artist John Langdon which he later used for the novel Angels & Demons. The liner notes also again credited his wife for her involvement, thanking her "for being my tireless cowriter, coproducer, second engineer, significant other, and therapist". The CD included songs such as "Here in These Fields" and the religious ballad, "All I Believe".

Brown and his wife Blythe moved to Rye, New Hampshire, in 1993. Brown became an English teacher at his alma mater Phillips Exeter, and gave Spanish classes to 6th, 7th, and 8th graders at Lincoln Akerman School, a small school for K–8th grade with about 250 students, in Hampton Falls. Brown has written a symphonic work titled Wild Symphony which is supplemented by a book of the same name. The book is illustrated by Hungarian artist Susan Batori which feature simple ambigrams for children, while the visuals trigger the corresponding music in an accompanying app. The music was recorded by the Zagreb Festival Orchestra and will receive its world concert premiere by the Portsmouth Symphony Orchestra in 2020. On March 30, 2022, it was announced that Metro-Goldwyn-Mayer and Weed Road Pictures will turn Wild Symphony into an animated musical feature film in the vein of Walt Disney's Fantasia, with Brown writing the screenplay and songs, and Akiva Goldsman producing.

=== Writing ===
While on vacation in Tahiti in 1993, Brown read Sidney Sheldon's novel The Doomsday Conspiracy, and was inspired to become a writer of thrillers. He started work on Digital Fortress, setting much of it in Seville, where he had studied in 1985. He also co-wrote a humor book with his wife, 187 Men to Avoid: A Survival Guide for the Romantically Frustrated Woman, under the pseudonym "Danielle Brown". The book's author profile reads, "Danielle Brown currently lives in New England: teaching school, writing books, and avoiding men." The copyright to the book is attributed to Brown.

In 1996, Brown quit teaching to become a full-time writer. Digital Fortress was published in 1998. His wife Blythe did much of the book's promotion, writing press releases, booking Brown on talk shows, and setting up press interviews. A few months later, Brown and his wife released The Bald Book, another humor book. It was officially credited to his wife, though a representative of the publisher said that it was primarily written by Brown. Brown subsequently wrote Angels & Demons and Deception Point, released in 2000 and 2001 respectively, the former of which was the first to feature the lead character, Harvard symbology expert Robert Langdon.

Brown's first three novels had little success, with fewer than 10,000 copies in each of their first printings. His fourth novel, The Da Vinci Code, became a bestseller, going to the top of the New York Times Best Seller list during its first week of release in 2003. It is one of the most popular books of all time, with 81 million copies sold worldwide as of 2009. Its success has helped push sales of Brown's earlier books. In 2004, all four of his novels were on the New York Times list in the same week, and in 2005 he made Time magazine's list of the 100 Most Influential People of the Year. Forbes magazine placed Brown at No. 12 on their 2005 "Celebrity 100" list, and estimated his annual income at US$76.5 million. According to the article published in The Times, the estimated income of Brown after Da Vinci Code sales is $250 million.

Brown's third novel featuring Robert Langdon, The Lost Symbol, was released on September 15, 2009. According to the publisher, on its first day the book sold over one million in hardcover and e-book versions in the US, the UK and Canada, prompting the printing of 600,000 hardcover copies in addition to the five million first printing. The story takes place in Washington D.C. over a period of twelve hours, and features the Freemasons. The book also includes many elements that made The Da Vinci Code a number one best seller. Brown's promotional website states that puzzles hidden in the book jacket of The Da Vinci Code, including two references to the Kryptos sculpture at CIA Headquarters in Langley, Virginia, give hints about the sequel. Brown has adopted a relevant theme in some of his earlier work.

Brown's fourth novel featuring Robert Langdon, Inferno is a mystery thriller novel released on May 14, 2013, by Doubleday. It ranked No. 1 on the New York Times Best Seller list for the first 11 weeks of its release, has sold more than 1.4 million copies in the US alone. In a 2006 interview, Brown stated that he had ideas for about 12 future books featuring Robert Langdon. Characters in Brown's books are often named after real people in his life. Robert Langdon is named after John Langdon, the artist who created the ambigrams used for the Angels & Demons CD and novel. Camerlengo Carlo Ventresca is named after On a Claire Day cartoonist friend Carla Ventresca. In the Vatican archives, Langdon recalls a wedding of two people named Dick and Connie, which are the names of his parents. Robert Langdon's editor Jonas Faukman is named after Brown's real life editor Jason Kaufman. Brown also said that characters were based on a New Hampshire librarian, and a French teacher at Exeter, André Vernet. Cardinal Aldo Baggia, in Angels & Demons, is named after Aldo Baggia, instructor of modern languages at Phillips Exeter Academy.

In interviews, Brown has said his wife, Blythe, is an art historian and painter. When they met, she was the Director of Artistic Development at the National Academy for Songwriters in Los Angeles. During the 2006 lawsuit over alleged copyright infringement in The Da Vinci Code, information was introduced at trial that showed that Blythe did research for the book. In one article, she was described as "chief researcher". Doubleday published his seventh book, Origin, on October 3, 2017. It is the fifth book in his Robert Langdon series.

==== Reception ====
Brown's prose style has been criticized as clumsy, with The Da Vinci Code being described as "committing style and word choice blunders in almost every paragraph". In his 2005 documentary for Channel 4, The Real Da Vinci Code, author and presenter Tony Robinson criticised both the accuracy of the author's historic research and the writing itself, considering the book to be not particularly well written. Much of the criticism was centered on Brown's claim in his preface that the novel is based on fact in relation to Opus Dei and the Priory of Sion, and that "all descriptions of artwork, architecture, documents and secret rituals in [the] novel are accurate".

==== Influences and habits ====
In addition to Sidney Sheldon, Brown has been quite vocal about a number of other literary influences who have inspired his writing. Recurring elements that Brown prefers to incorporate into his novels include a simple hero pulled out of their familiar setting and thrust into a new one with which they are unfamiliar, an attractive female sidekick/ love interest, foreign travel, imminent danger from a pursuing villain, antagonists who have a disability or genetic disorder, and a 24-hour time frame in which the story takes place.

Brown's work is heavily influenced by academic Joseph Campbell, who wrote extensively on mythology and religion and was highly influential in the field of screenwriting. Brown also states he based the character of Robert Langdon on Campbell. Director Alfred Hitchcock appears to be another key influence on Brown. Like Hitchcock, the writer favors suspense-laden plots involving an innocent middle-aged man pursued by deadly foes, glamorous foreign settings, key scenes set in tourist destinations, a cast of wealthy and eccentric characters, young and curvaceous female sidekicks, Catholicism and MacGuffins. Brown does his writing in his loft. He told fans that he uses inversion therapy to help with writer's block. He uses gravity boots and says, "hanging upside down seems to help me solve plot challenges by shifting my entire perspective".

==== Copyright infringement cases ====
In August 2005 author Lewis Perdue unsuccessfully sued Brown for plagiarism, on the basis of claimed similarity between The Da Vinci Code and his novels, The Da Vinci Legacy (1983) and Daughter of God (2000). Judge George B. Daniels said, in part: "A reasonable average lay observer would not conclude that The Da Vinci Code is substantially similar to Daughter of God." In April 2006 Brown's publisher, Random House, won a copyright infringement case brought by authors Michael Baigent and Richard Leigh, who claimed that Brown stole ideas from their 1982 book Holy Blood Holy Grail for his 2003 novel The Da Vinci Code. It was in the book Holy Blood Holy Grail that Baigent, Leigh, and co-author Henry Lincoln had advanced the theory that Jesus and Mary Magdalene married and had a child and that the bloodline continues to this day. Brown apparently alluded to the two authors' names in his book. Leigh Teabing, a lead character in both the novel and the film, uses Leigh's name as the first name, and anagrammatically derives his last name from Baigent's. Mr Justice Peter Smith found in Brown's favor in the case, and as a private amusement, embedded his own Smithy code in the written judgment.

On March 28, 2007, Brown's publisher, Random House, won an appeal copyright infringement case. The Court of Appeal of England and Wales rejected the efforts from Baigent and Leigh, who became liable for paying legal expenses of nearly US$6 million. Brown has been sued twice in U.S. federal courts by the author Jack Dunn, who claims Brown copied a huge part of his book The Vatican Boys to write The Da Vinci Code (2006–07) and Angels & Demons (2011–12). Both lawsuits were not allowed to go to a jury trial and Jack Dunn claims the judge in both cases benefited from his decisions by becoming an author published and supported by people associated with Random House. In 2017, in London, another claim was begun against Brown by Jack Dunn who claimed that justice was not served in the U.S. lawsuits.

== Charity work ==
In October 2004, Brown and his siblings donated US$2.2 million to Phillips Exeter Academy in honor of their father, to set up the Richard G. Brown Technology Endowment to help "provide computers and high-tech equipment for students in need". On April 14, 2011, Dan and his wife, Blythe Newlon Brown, created an eponymous scholarship fund to celebrate the 25th anniversary of his graduation from Amherst College. It is a permanently endowed scholarship fund that provides financial aid to students at Amherst, with preference given to incoming students with an interest in writing. On June 16, 2016, Brown donated US$337,000 to the Ritman Library in Amsterdam to digitize a collection of ancient books.

== Personal life ==
Brown and his wife, Blythe Newlon, were supporters of the New Hampshire Charitable Foundation. In 2019, after 22 years of marriage, Brown and his wife acrimoniously divorced due to his alleged infidelities during the latter part of their marriage. This led to a lawsuit by Newlon. After a series of delays, the couple agreed to settle the lawsuit in December 2021. In the acknowledgments of his 2025 novel The Secret of Secrets, Brown refers to Dutch equestrian Judith Pietersen as his fiancée.

== Bibliography ==
=== Stand-alone novels ===
- Digital Fortress (1998) ISBN 0312335164, 978-0312335168
- Deception Point (2001) ISBN 1416524886, 978-1416524885

=== Robert Langdon series ===
1. Angels & Demons (2000)
2. The Da Vinci Code (2003)
3. The Lost Symbol (2009)
4. Inferno (2013)
5. Origin (2017)
6. The Secret of Secrets (2025)

=== Children's books ===
- Wild Symphony (2020)

== Adaptations ==
In 2006, Brown's novel The Da Vinci Code was released as a film by Columbia Pictures, with director Ron Howard and starring Tom Hanks. It was widely anticipated and launched the 2006 Cannes Film Festival, though it received overall poor reviews. It currently has a 26% rating at the film review aggregator website Rotten Tomatoes, derived from 165 negative reviews of the 214 counted. It was later listed as one of the worst films of 2006 on Ebert & Roeper, but also the second highest-grossing film of the year, pulling in US$750 million worldwide.

Brown was listed as one of the executive producers of the film The Da Vinci Code, and also created additional codes for the film. One of his songs, "Phiano", which Brown wrote and performed, was listed as part of the film's soundtrack. In the film, Brown and his wife can be seen in the background of one of the early book signing scenes. The next film, Angels & Demons, was released on May 15, 2009, with Howard and Hanks returning. It, too, garnered mostly negative reviews, though critics were kinder to it than to its predecessor; it has a 37% meta-rating at Rotten Tomatoes.

Filmmakers expressed interest in adapting The Lost Symbol into a film as well. The screenplay was written by Danny Strong, with pre-production expected to begin in 2013. According to a January 2013 article in Los Angeles Times the final draft of the screenplay was due sometime in February. In July 2013, Sony Pictures announced they would instead adapt Inferno for a release date of October 14, 2016, with Ron Howard as director, David Koepp adapting the screenplay and Tom Hanks reprising his role as Robert Langdon. Inferno was released on October 28, 2016.

Imagine Entertainment was announced in 2014 to produce a television series based on Digital Fortress, written by Josh Goldin and Rachel Abramowitz. In 2021, Dan Brown's The Lost Symbol was adapted into a television series repositioned as an origin story for Brown's Robert Langdon character with Ashley Zukerman playing Langdon. It ran on the streaming service Peacock for one season.

== Honors ==
Dan Brown received the Chevalier rank of the Ordre des Arts et des Lettres in March 2026.
