= Ashley Zukerman =

Australian actor

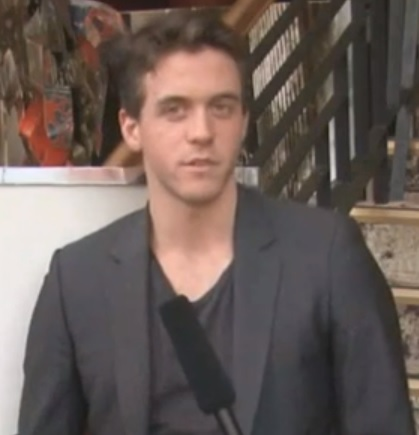
- Zukerman in 2011
- Born: 1983 (age 42–43); Santa Monica, California, U.S.
- Education: Victorian College of the Arts
- Occupation: Actor
- Years active: 2006–present
- Known for: Michael Sandrelli of Rush; Jesse Banks of The Code; Dr. Charlie Isaacs of Manhattan; Nate Sofrelli of Succession
- Relatives: Wendy Zukerman (sister)

Ashley Zukerman (born 30 December 1983) is an Australian actor. He became known in Australia for playing Senior Constable Michael Sandrelli in the drama series Rush (2008). He played Jesse Banks in the political thriller The Code, for which he received an AACTA Award for Best Lead Actor in a Television Drama in 2014. He played Dr. Charlie Isaacs on WGN America's Manhattan (2014–15), Vice President Peter MacLeish in the American Broadcasting Company political thriller Designated Survivor (2016–17), and had a recurring role in Succession. In 2021, he portrayed Robert Langdon in the TV series adaptation of Dan Brown's The Lost Symbol.

== Early life and education ==
Ashley Zukerman was born in 1983 in Santa Monica, California, US, and moved to Melbourne, Australia, with his family when he was two. His father, Moshe, is from Israel and his mother, Ingrid, is from Peru. His family is Jewish, and his parents spoke Hebrew during his childhood, so he grew up bilingual. He is the brother of Science Vs. podcaster Wendy Zukerman, and has another sister, Debbie.

He attended Wesley College at the Glen Waverley campus and began a degree in science and engineering at Monash University before being accepted into the Victorian College of the Arts. He graduated in 2006.

== Career ==
Zukerman began his professional career in the theatre. He had a critically acclaimed role as Timms in The History Boys, directed by Peter Evans for the Melbourne Theatre Company in April 2007.

He appeared in HBO's war miniseries The Pacific, which premiered on 14 March 2010, and in Lowdown created by Adam Zwar and Amanda Brotchie. His Australian break came when he played Constable Michael Sandrelli on the series Rush, for which he was nominated for a Logie award in the Most Outstanding New Talent category. In 2011, after his time on Rush, Zukerman joined the cast of the short-lived Steven Spielberg–produced sci-fi television series Terra Nova.

Zukerman then returned to the theatre, working with director Eamon Flack at the Belvoir Theatre Company in As You Like It playing Orlando, and then two years later in Angels in America playing Joe Pitt. Angels in America won Best Play at the 2014 Helpmann Awards.

He played socially dysfunctional genius hacker Jesse Banks opposite Dan Spielman in the Australian political thriller The Code, created by Shelley Birse. The show received huge national and international acclaim and 10 AACTA Award nominations, out of which it won six, including Best Lead Actor in a Television Drama for Zukerman.

Early in 2014, Zukerman won the role of ambitious wunderkind Dr. Charlie Isaacs in the WGN America original drama Manhattan, created by filmmaker Sam Shaw and directed by Thomas Schlamme.

In 2016, Zukerman was cast in the recurring role of Peter MacLeish on the ABC political drama series Designated Survivor, which premiered in the autumn of the same year.

In 2018, Zukerman had a recurring role on the HBO series Succession, and in 2020, appeared as the title character's husband on the Hulu miniseries A Teacher. In 2021, he starred in the Netflix Fear Street horror trilogy, beginning with Fear Street Part One: 1994. It was announced in March 2020 that Zukerman had been cast to portray Robert Langdon in the NBC drama pilot Langdon, based on Dan Brown's 2009 thriller novel The Lost Symbol.

In 2025, Zukerman played the partner of disgraced wellness influencer and convicted con artist Belle Gibson in the biographical Australian miniseries Apple Cider Vinegar. It was released on Netflix in February 2025.

In 2025, Zukerman guest-starred as Congressman Daniel Keene in the season two finale of the Apple TV+ sci-fi series Silo, and joined the main cast for season three.

In October 2026, Zukerman was cast in the Los Angeles production of Lungs opposite Zoe Lister-Jones. The two-person play written by Duncan Macmillan and directed by Jack Serio is the first Mainstage production to take place at Huron Station Playhouse.

== Acting credits ==
=== Film ===
| Year | Title | Role | Notes |
|---|---|---|---|
| 2004 | Tom White | Thug #2 | |
| 2010 | Blame | Anthony | |
| 2011 | The Crimson Room | John | Short |
| 2013 | The Humble Beginnings of the Balloon | Todd Digby | Short |
| 2013 | Miasmata | Max | Short |
| 2018 | The Wind | Isaac Macklin | |
| 2020 | Language Arts | Charles Marlow | |
| 2021 | Fear Street Part One: 1994 | Nick Goode | |
| 2021 | Fear Street Part Two: 1978 | Nick Goode | |
| 2021 | Fear Street Part Three: 1666 | Nick Goode / Solomon Goode | |
| 2021 | Upload | CEO | |
| 2024 | In Vitro | Jack | |
| 2024 | Bad Shabbos | Benjamin | |
| 2025 | One More Shot | Rodney | |

=== Television ===
| Year | Title | Role | Notes | Ref |
|---|---|---|---|---|
| 2008–2011 | Rush | Senior Constable Michael Sandrelli | Main role | |
| 2010 | The Pacific | Robert 'Mac' MacKenzie | Miniseries | |
| 2010 | Lowdown | Dylan Hunt | Recurring role | |
| 2011 | The Slap | Dylan | Episode: "Anouk" | |
| 2011 | Terra Nova | Lucas Taylor | Recurring role | |
| 2012 | Death Star PR | Bilson | Episode: "Nemesis" | |
| 2013 | Mr & Mrs Murder | Alex Moran | Episode: "En Vogue" | |
| 2013 | Underbelly: Squizzy | Detective James Bruce | Main role | |
| 2014–2015 | Manhattan | Dr Charlie Isaacs | Main role | |
| 2014–2016 | The Code | Jesse Banks | Main role | |
| 2015 | Childhood's End | Jake Greggson | Miniseries | |
| 2016 | Four Stars | Danny | TV film | |
| 2016 | Fear the Walking Dead | Will | Episode: "Pillar of Salt" | |
| 2016 | Masters of Sex | Gary Bucksey | Episodes: "The Pleasure Protocol", "Coats or Keys" | |
| 2016–2017 | Designated Survivor | Vice President Peter MacLeish | Season 1, recurring role | |
| 2017 | Friday on My Mind | Ted Albert | Miniseries | |
| 2018 | Reverie | Nate Hallo | Episode: "No More Mr. Nice Guy" | |
| 2018–2023 | Succession | Nate Sofrelli | Recurring role | |
| 2020 | A Teacher | Matt Mitchell | Main role | |
| 2021 | Dan Brown's The Lost Symbol | Robert Langdon | Main role | |
| 2023 | City on Fire | Keith | Main role | |
| 2025–present | Silo | Daniel Keene | Main role | |
| 2025 | Apple Cider Vinegar | Clive Rothwell | 5 episodes | |

=== Theatre ===
| Year | Title | Role | Venue / Co. | Ref |
|---|---|---|---|---|
| 2007 | The History Boys | Timms | Playhouse, Melbourne with MTC | |
| 2008 | The Hypocrite | Valére | Playhouse, Melbourne with MTC | |
| 2009 | B.C. | Joseph | BlackBox with The Hayloft Project | |
| 2009 | This Is Our Youth | Warren | Fortyfivedownstairs, Melbourne | |
| 2011 | As You Like It | Orlando | Belvoir St Theatre, Sydney | |
| 2013 | Angels in America Part One: Millennium Approaches | | Belvoir St Theatre, Sydney, Theatre Royal Sydney | |
| 2013 | Angels in America Part Two: Perestroika | | Belvoir St Theatre, Sydney, Theatre Royal Sydney | |
| 2026 | Lungs | W | Huron Station Playhouse, Los Angeles | |

== Accolades ==
| Year | Award | Category | Subject | Result |
|---|---|---|---|---|
| 2009 | Logie Awards | Best New Talent | Rush | Nominated |
| 2014 | AACTA Awards | Best Actor in a Television Drama | The Code | Nominated |
| 2015 | AACTA Awards | Best Actor in a Television Drama | The Code | Won |
| 2015 | Silver Logie Award | Most Outstanding Actor | The Code | Nominated |
| 2016 | AACTA Awards | Best Actor in a Television Drama | The Code | Nominated |
| 2018 | AACTA Awards | Best Guest or Supporting Actor in a Television Drama | Friday On My Mind | Nominated |
