= The Secret of Secrets (novel) =

2025 novel by Dan Brown

- Author: Dan Brown
- Audio read by: Paul Michael
- Language: English
- Series: Robert Langdon #6
- Genre: Crime; mystery; thriller
- Publisher: Doubleday
- Publication date: September 9, 2025
- Publication place: United States
- Pages: 688
- ISBN: 9780385546898
- Preceded by: Origin

The Secret of Secrets is a mystery thriller novel by American author Dan Brown and the sixth installment in his Robert Langdon series, following Origin. The book was released on September 9, 2025.

As of January 2026, the book has been featured on New York Times' best-seller list for 17 weeks in a row.

== Plot ==
Robert Langdon is in Prague with his girlfriend, noetic scientist Katherine Solomon, who is lecturing on human consciousness. The next morning, Langdon sees a strangely dressed woman on Charles Bridge, recalling a disturbing dream Katherine had during the night. Believing an explosion is imminent, he evacuates their hotel, only to discover the threat was false. He is detained by ÚZSI captain Janáček and lieutenant Pavel, who reveal that a bomb had actually been found and disarmed. Janáček suspects Langdon and Solomon staged the incident to promote Katherine's forthcoming book.

With US Embassy attache Michael Harris pressuring the officers, Langdon attempts to prove their innocence by taking them to Crucifix Bastion, where Katherine was due to meet scientist Brigita Gessner. Finding the facility deserted, Langdon discovers a secret entrance and escapes Pavel, but finds Gessner dead in her laboratory. He also encounters Sasha Vesna, whom Gessner had brought from a Russian mental health institute to assist her after treating Sasha's severe epilepsy with a brain implant.

Katherine is secretly being targeted by In-Q-Tel, a group led by former CIA agent Everett Finch that operates an underground Prague facility known as "Threshold". Gessner, Sasha, and US Ambassador Heide Nagel are involved in the project. Because Katherine's research overlaps with Threshold's work, and because she opposes weaponising such research, Finch has monitored her forthcoming book. Gessner invited Katherine to Prague under the pretence of reconnaissance and sought to make her sign a non-disclosure agreement that would also enable Finch to suppress the book. After hackers obtain a copy, Finch regards it as a threat and orders its digital copies and backups destroyed. Operatives kidnap editor Jonas Faukman to destroy the sole physical copy, but they are arrested. Finch also arranged the woman on Charles Bridge and the false bomb threat to distract Langdon. Meanwhile, a mysterious figure calling himself the Golěm, claiming to protect Sasha, kills Gessner and Harris and targets Threshold.

The Golěm kills Janáček while searching Gessner's laboratory, causing Pavel to blame Langdon. Sasha helps Langdon escape, and the Golěm leaves a note claiming to have taken Katherine to lure Langdon away from her. Following a coded message from Katherine, Langdon reaches her at the Klementium. To evade Pavel, he burns what appears to be the last copy of the book, triggering the fire alarms and allowing Nagel's men to rescue them and arrest Pavel.

Katherine explains that her book presents evidence suggesting non-local consciousness: the mind may become completely open immediately before death, while individual consciousness may persist afterwards as part of a universal whole. Langdon reveals that the US Embassy had planted an audio surveillance device in their hotel room, enabling it to recreate Katherine's dream. At Nagel's residence, Finch prepares to meet them and Nagel asks them to sign non-disclosure agreements, which Langdon recognises as a means of legally preventing publication. Faukman confirms that the CIA is targeting the book and that Nagel, a former CIA attorney, is involved. After learning of Harris's death, however, Nagel turns against Finch, explaining that he coerced her into becoming a puppet for the CIA and helping establish Threshold by threatening to frame her for treason. She helps Langdon and Katherine escape and return to the embassy, where she uses a video of Gessner being tortured into confessing Threshold's activities to blackmail her former CIA superior.

Langdon and Katherine enter Threshold through a secret passage beneath Gessner's laboratory. Beneath Folimanka Park, they discover that Threshold has experimented on people with epilepsy, including Sasha and Dmitri Sysevich, while researching non-local consciousness and advanced brain implants. Katherine learns that the project has developed artificial neurons capable of complete human-machine interfacing, based on designs from her postgraduate thesis twenty-three years earlier. The CIA had stolen the designs and developed them secretly; Katherine's professor had secured a patent application as proof of her authorship, and she later reproduced it in her book, explaining Finch's determination to suppress its publication.

Finch confronts them and reveals Threshold's purpose: placing subjects in near-death states to access the collective unconscious, while implants allow operators to monitor and control their experiences, enabling espionage. Finch considers the technology essential to military intelligence and national security and refuses to make it public. Before he can kill Langdon and Katherine, the Golěm incapacitates him and helps them escape. The Golěm traps Finch in a pod before sabotaging the facility, which explodes and kills him, while Langdon, Katherine, and the Golěm survive.

Searching for Sasha, Langdon and Katherine realise that the Golěm is Sasha herself. Her abuse in the Russian institution caused dissociative identity disorder, and the Golěm emerges when she is threatened. Nagel later tells them that the US military intends to interrogate them over the explosion, but promises to use Gessner's confession to protect them. Sasha has sought asylum, but because of her condition, her reliance on Threshold's treatment, and the possibility that her brain implant contains a fatal kill switch, Nagel proposes returning her to Threshold on condition that she is treated humanely. Sasha agrees, partly because she has always wanted to see America, while the Golěm remains dormant as a guiding mental voice.

Katherine's book is permitted to appear with certain elements removed. Langdon reveals that he only burned its bibliography and secretly preserved the manuscript. Katherine declares her love for him, and they return to New York to give the book to Faukman, deciding to title it The Secret of Secrets after its revelation about life after death.

== Setting ==
The novel incorporates numerous real locations in Prague into its plot, including Charles Bridge, the Klementinum, Old Town Square, Prague Castle, Petřín Hill, the Bastion U Božích muk, and the Cold War bunker beneath Folimanka Park. Prague City Tourism, in cooperation with Argo Publishers, also produced an official map identifying 15 real-life locations featured in the novel.

== Reception ==
The New York Times called it a "wistful testament to the power of the printed word". The review highlighted Brown's intricate plot, fast-paced suspenseful narrative, and frequent twists, all characteristic of his style. However, it noted that the book does not quite match the cultural impact of The Da Vinci Code, which sold millions and shaped public debate. Instead, the reviewer suggested The Secret of Secrets should be viewed as a relic from a bygone era of literature, evoking nostalgia for Brown's earlier successes.

The Associated Press review described the novel as a 650-page thriller featuring Langdon on a dangerous quest through Prague, where he is caught up in an international race to unlock the mystery of what happens after death. Brown once again blends suspense, philosophical themes, travelogues, codes, puzzles, and secret societies, continuing the style that has defined his previous million-selling novels.

== Television adaptation ==
It was announced in May 2025 that Netflix had picked up a series adaptation of the novel with Carlton Cuse serving as showrunner. Cuse and Brown are set to executive produce the series. In July 2026, it was reported that the series would star Morgan Spector as Robert Langdon and Rebecca Hall as Katherine Solomon.
