= Inferno (2016 film) =

2016 American action mystery film directed by Ron Howard

- Theatrical release poster
- Directed by: Ron Howard
- Screenplay by: David Koepp
- Based on: Inferno by Dan Brown
- Produced by: Brian Grazer; Ron Howard
- Starring: Tom Hanks; Felicity Jones; Irrfan Khan; Omar Sy; Ben Foster; Sidse Babett Knudsen
- Cinematography: Salvatore Totino
- Edited by: Dan Hanley; Tom Elkins
- Music by: Hans Zimmer
- Production companies: Columbia Pictures; Imagine Entertainment; LStar Capital; LSG Productions; Mid Atlantic Films
- Distributed by: Sony Pictures Releasing
- Release dates: October 8, 2016 (Florence); October 28, 2016 (United States)
- Running time: 121 minutes
- Country: United States
- Languages: English; Italian
- Budget: $75 million
- Box office: $220 million

Inferno is a 2016 American action mystery thriller film directed by Ron Howard and written by David Koepp. It is loosely based on the 2013 novel by Dan Brown. The sequel to The Da Vinci Code (2006) and Angels & Demons (2009), it is the third and final film in the Robert Langdon film series. It stars Tom Hanks, reprising his role as Robert Langdon, alongside Felicity Jones as Dr. Sienna Brooks, Omar Sy, Sidse Babett Knudsen, Ben Foster, and Irrfan Khan.

Filming began on April 27, 2015, in Venice, Italy, wrapping on July 21 of that year in Budapest. Inferno premiered in Florence (one of its filming locations) on October 8, 2016, and was released in the United States on October 28, ten years after the release of The Da Vinci Code. The film received mixed reviews from critics, and grossed $220 million against a $75 million production budget.

== Plot ==
Some time after helping the Holy See deal with an antimatter threat, (Note: As depicted in Angels & Demons (2009)) Harvard University professor Robert Langdon awakens in a hospital room in Florence, Italy. He has no memory of the last few days but is plagued with hellish visions. Dr. Sienna Brooks, the doctor attending him, reveals that he is suffering from amnesia caused by a bullet wound to the head. An orderly says the police are there to question Langdon but the officer turns out to be the assassin Vayentha, who shoots the orderly while coming up the hallway. Brooks helps Langdon to escape, and they flee to her apartment.

Among Langdon's personal belongings, Langdon and Brooks find a Faraday pointer, a miniature image projector with a modified version of Sandro Botticelli's Map of Hell, which itself is based on Dante's Inferno. They soon realize this is the first clue in a trail left by the radical, transhumanist genius scientist Bertrand Zobrist, who believed that rigorous measures were necessary to reduce the Earth's growing population, and who committed suicide three days earlier after being chased by armed government agents.

Langdon and Brooks figure out that Zobrist, who was obsessed with Dante, has created a biological superweapon he has dubbed "Inferno", with the potential of annihilating half the world's population. In the meantime, they have been traced by both Vayentha and government agents, who try to raid the apartment, forcing them to flee again. The agents are headed by Elizabeth Sinskey, a former lover of Langdon's. Vayentha reports to her employer Harry Sims, the CEO of a private security company called "The Consortium". He is acting on behalf of Zobrist, he then instructs her to kill Langdon, as he has become a liability.

Langdon's knowledge of Dante's work and history, and of hidden passages in Florence, allows the two to follow clues such as letters and phrases which lead to various locations in Florence and Venice. They also inadvertently kill Vayentha while evading the agents. Along the way, Langdon discovers that he helped a friend of his steal and hide the Dante death mask, a crucial clue, an event that he also does not remember.

Zobrist had provided Sims with a video message about the attack, to be broadcast after it has been released. Shocked by its content, Sims allies with Sinskey to prevent the outbreak. However, Langdon and Brooks are contacted by Christoph Bouchard, a man working with Sinskey, warning them that Sinskey is a double agent and is after the Inferno for her own profit. The three cooperate for a while, until Langdon realizes that Bouchard is lying and seeking to profit from Inferno himself, forcing the duo to flee on their own again.

Langdon figures out that the attack is in the Hagia Sophia in Istanbul. With that knowledge, Brooks abandons Langdon, revealing that she was Zobrist's lover and that she will ensure the release of the weapon. Zobrist and Brooks used to play treasure hunt games; this trail was the backup plan in case something happened to Zobrist.

Langdon is recaptured by Bouchard but Sims kills Bouchard and rescues Langdon, who then re-teams with Sinskey, who asked him for help in interpreting the imagery from the Faraday pointer. Sims reveals he was hired by Brooks to kidnap Langdon when Zobrist had been killed. He drugged him with benzodiazepine to induce memory loss, so the events in the hospital were all staged.

They deduce the weapon is in a plastic bag hidden underwater in the Basilica Cistern in Istanbul. The agents team – joined by Langdon, Sims, and Sinskey – race to locate and secure the bag, while Brooks and fellow Zobrist disciples attempt to detonate an explosive to rupture the bag and aerosolize the weapon. Sims incapacitates a disciple and kills another but is fatally stabbed by Brooks who, refusing Langdon's pleas, releases the weapon by manually triggering an underwater blast. The detonation ruptures the bag, which however has been trapped by Sinskey in a special containment unit.

After struggling against Sinskey and Langdon to open the container, Brooks' last ally is killed by special units. The weapon is secured for analysis, while Langdon and Sinskey ruminate on the idealism of youth and the future of humanity. Langdon returns to Florence and covertly returns the Dante death mask.

== Cast ==
- Tom Hanks as Professor Robert Langdon, a professor of symbology at Harvard University.
- Felicity Jones as Dr. Sienna Brooks, a doctor who helps Langdon escape.
- Omar Sy as Christophe Bouchard, head of the SRS team (Surveillance and Response Support), of the European Centre for Disease Prevention and Control.
- Ben Foster as Bertrand Zobrist, a billionaire and transhumanist scientist, intent on solving the world's overpopulation problem.
- Sidse Babett Knudsen as Dr. Elizabeth Sinskey, head of the World Health Organization.
- Irrfan Khan as Harry "The Provost" Sims, head of The Consortium, helping Zobrist in his mission.
- Paul Ritter as CRC Tech Arbogast, right-hand man to Sims.
- Ana Ularu as Vayentha, The Consortium's agent in Florence who has orders to follow Langdon.

== Production ==
=== Development ===
On July 16, 2013, Columbia Pictures set Ron Howard to direct Inferno, Dan Brown's fourth novel in the Robert Langdon series, with David Koepp writing the script. Imagine Entertainment was set to produce the film, while Tom Hanks was again set to reprise his role as Robert Langdon. On August 26, 2014, Sony had finalized the deal with Howard and Hanks, and set the film for an April start of production in Italy. Brian Grazer was also set to produce the film with Howard.

On December 2, Felicity Jones was in early talks to join the film. On February 17, 2015, studio revealed the confirmed cast for the film, including Jones as Dr. Sienna Brooks, Omar Sy as Christoph Bruder, Irrfan Khan as Harry "The Provost" Sims, and Sidse Babett Knudsen as Elizabeth Sinskey, head of the World Health Organization. Ben Foster was set for an unspecified villainous role on March 10, 2015, which later revealed to be the role of Bertrand Zobrist.

=== Filming ===
Filming began on April 27, 2015, in Venice, Italy, and continued in Florence, Italy, starting at the end of April. Outdoor scenes featuring Hanks were filmed near the Palazzo Vecchio and elsewhere in the historic center of the city, starting on May 2, 2015. Some second unit stunts were filmed by Wade Eastwood at an apartment building close to the Ponte Vecchio, in Florence. Low-flying aerial shots of Florence landmarks, its river and bridges were filmed on May 11, 2015. A sequence displayed in an early trailer features a Padova railway station sign; locals of Padova immediately recognized the scene as recreated somewhere else. As of June 5, 2015, most of the film was planned to be shot in Budapest, Hungary, at Korda Studios. Filming wrapped on July 21, 2015.

During location filming, its production codename was "Headache", a reference to a concussion suffered by Langdon early in the story.

=== Music ===
The score was composed and arranged by Hans Zimmer and recorded at Synchron Stage Vienna in Austria.

Track listing
No.	Title	Length
1.	"Maybe Pain Can Save Us"	3:02
2.	"Cerca Trova"	3:17
3.	"I'm Feeling A Tad Vulnerable"	2:08
4.	"Seek and Find"	2:03
5.	"Professor"	4:26
6.	"Venice"	5:44
7.	"Via Dolorosa #12 Apartment 3C"	4:20
8.	"Vayentha"	4:38
9.	"Remove Langdon"	3:17
10.	"Doing Nothing Terrifies Me"	3:24
11.	"A Minute to Midnight"	1:52
12.	"The Cistern"	6:43
13.	"Beauty Awakens The Soul To Act"	5:58
14.	"Elizabeth"	4:33
15.	"The Logic Of Tyrants"	5:07
16.	"Life Must Have Its Mysteries"	3:54
17.	"Our Own Hell On Earth"	6:19
Total length:		70:45

== Release ==
In July 2013, Sony set the film for a release on December 18, 2015. However, due to the date clash with Star Wars: The Force Awakens, the release date was moved to October 14, 2016. In early 2016, the release date was pushed back two more weeks to October 28, 2016.

On May 9, 2016, Sony Pictures released the first teaser trailer for the film. The film premiered in Florence, Italy on October 8, 2016, at the New Opera Theater and also held a premiere in India on October 13, 2016, due to the popularity of actor Irrfan Khan.

== Reception ==
=== Box office ===
Inferno grossed $34.3 million in the United States and Canada and $185.7 million in other countries for a worldwide total of $220 million, against a production budget of $75 million.

In the United States and Canada, Inferno was initially expected to top the box office with around $25 million from 3,546 theaters in its opening weekend. It made $800,000 from Thursday night previews and $5.6 million on its first day, lowering weekend projections to $15 million. It opened to $14.9 million, finishing second at the box office behind Boo! A Madea Halloween and marked the fourth straight domestic disappointment for director Ron Howard.

Internationally, the film was released two weeks ahead of its North American debut, across 53 overseas markets (about 66% of its total international market) in order to avoid competition from Disney/Marvel Studios' Doctor Strange. It finished at first place at the box office in 45 of those countries. In total, it opened to $49.7 million, of which $2.6 million came from IMAX theaters, the second biggest amount of October. It fell 49% in its second weekend, earning $28.9 million from 58 markets and was surpassed by Jack Reacher: Never Go Back at the chart. Italy, where the film was partly shot, delivered the biggest opening with $5 million; this was followed by Germany ($4.4 million), Russia ($4.4 million), the United Kingdom and Ireland ($3.8 million), Spain ($2 million) and the Netherlands ($1.2 million). Inferno's £2.97 million debut in the U.K. is considerably less than the first (£9.50 million) and the second film (£6.05 million). In Latin America, the film debuted in first in all 11 markets, earning a combined $9 million. Brazil led with $4 million, followed by Mexico ($2.6 million). Similarly in South East Asia, it saw top openings in six out of seven markets for a combined $6 million. Japan ($3.3 million), Taiwan ($1.7 million), India ($1.9 million) and Indonesia ($1 million) posted the biggest debuts. In China, it opened at number one with $13.3 million. In the Oceania region, Australia launched with $1.8 million. Inferno opened to number one across the Middle East for a regional total of $1.8 million. The film opened in France on November 9 and grossed $24.3 million on its opening weekend.

=== Critical reception ===
Inferno received generally negative reviews from critics. On Rotten Tomatoes, a review aggregator, the film has an approval rating of 23% based on 251 reviews; the average rating is 4.60/10. The website's critical consensus reads, "Senselessly frantic and altogether shallow, Inferno sends the Robert Langdon trilogy spiraling to a convoluted new low." On Metacritic, the film has a score of 42 out of 100 based on 47 critics, indicating "mixed or average" reviews. Audiences polled by CinemaScore gave the film an average grade of "B+" on an A+ to F scale.

British film critic Mark Kermode gave the film a negative review, calling it, "intergalactically stupid". Cinema Blend wrote Inferno is "insufferable. And while you're obviously meant to take Inferno with a dash of salt, it's so preposterously stupid and dumb that this rancid popcorn flick becomes increasingly nauseating the further you taste."

== See also ==
- Dante Alighieri and the Divine Comedy in popular culture
