= Inferno (Brown novel) =

2013 novel by Dan Brown

- First American edition cover
- Author: Dan Brown
- Language: English
- Series: Robert Langdon #4
- Genre: Mystery, Conspiracy fiction, Thriller
- Publisher: Doubleday
- Publication date: May 14, 2013
- Publication place: United States; United Kingdom
- Media type: Print, e-book, movie
- Pages: 642 pages
- ISBN: 978-0-385-53785-8
- OCLC: 824723329
- Preceded by: The Lost Symbol
- Followed by: Origin

Inferno is a 2013 mystery thriller novel by American author Dan Brown and the fourth book in his Robert Langdon series, following Angels & Demons, The Da Vinci Code and The Lost Symbol. The book was published on May 14, 2013, ten years after publication of The Da Vinci Code (2003), by Doubleday. It was number one on the New York Times Best Seller list for hardcover fiction and Combined Print & E-book fiction for the first eleven weeks of its release, and also remained on the list of E-book fiction for the first seventeen weeks of its release. A film adaptation was released in the United States on October 28, 2016.

== Plot ==
Harvard symbolism professor Robert Langdon wakes up in a hospital in Florence, Italy, with a head wound and no memory of the last few days. Dr. Sienna Brooks, one of the doctors tending to him, reveals that he is suffering from amnesia and hearing a woman's voice repeatedly saying "seek and find". When Vayentha, an assassin, shows up in the hospital and kills one of the doctors while attempting to kill Langdon, Brooks helps Langdon escape, and they flee to her apartment. Brooks plays a tape recording on which Langdon repeats what sounds like "very sorry", which he later discovers he mumbled "Vasari" .

Langdon finds a cylinder with a biohazard sign in his jacket and decides to call the U.S. consulate. He learns that they are searching for him but, prompted by Brooks, claims to be across the street from her apartment, to avoid getting her more involved. Soon, Langdon sees Vayentha pull up to the location he gave the consulate. He deduces that the U.S. government wants to kill him. Langdon opens the container and finds a small medieval bone cylinder fitted with a hi-tech projector (Faraday Pointer) that displays a modified version of Botticelli's Map of Hell, which is based on Dante's Inferno. A trail of clues leads them toward the Old City.

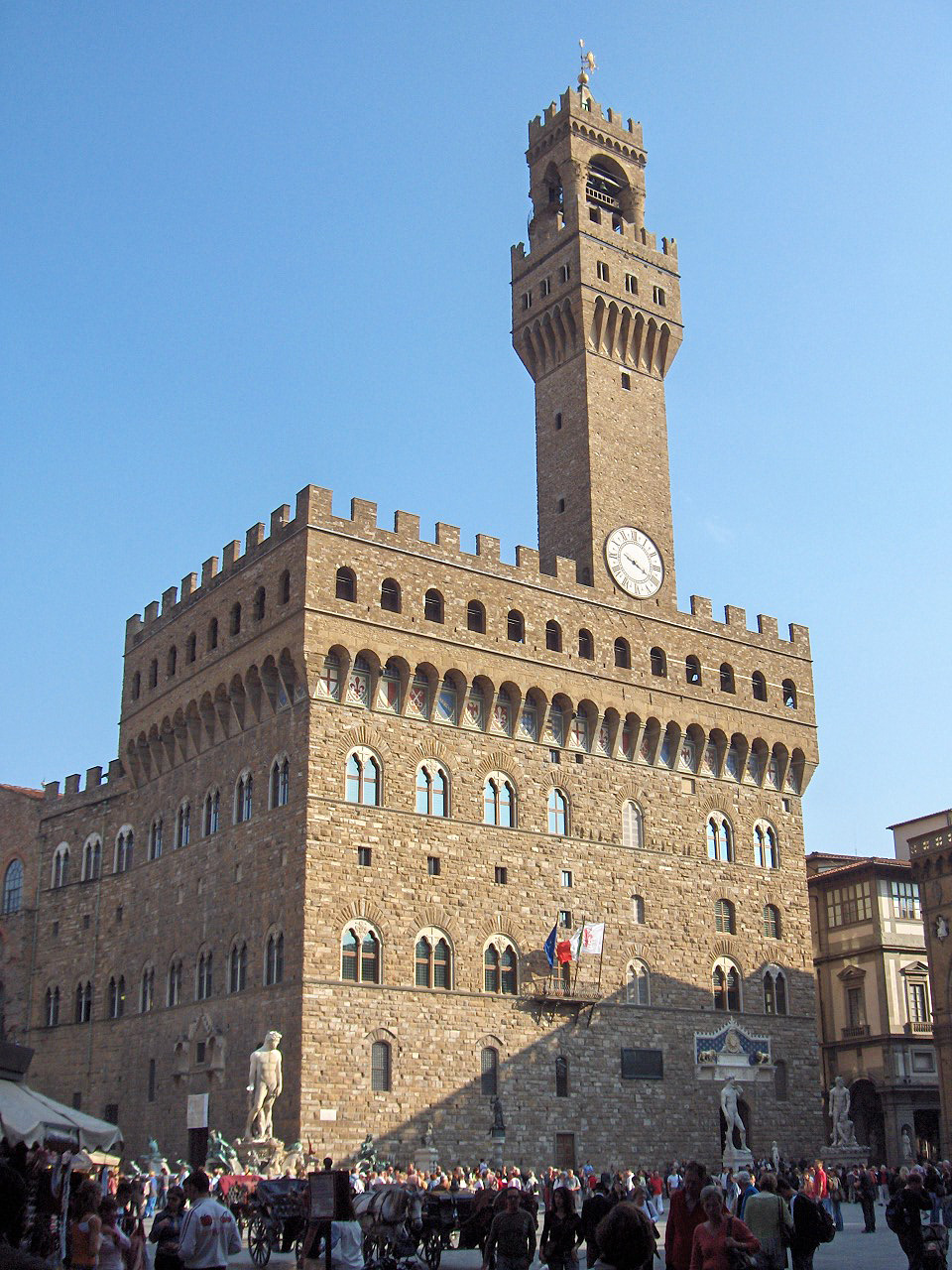
The Palazzo Vecchio in Florence

Langdon goes there with Brooks but they see that a team of soldiers, and the Florentine Carabinieri are searching for them. They flee, and Langdon examines the "Map of Hell" again, noticing several changes to the layers. Langdon discovers an anagram, Catro Vacer, which means to "seek and find" as heard by Langdon in his visions. They manage to evade the soldiers and get into the Palazzo Vecchio using the Vasari Corridor. They discover the phrase in the painting The Battle of Marciano by Vasari, located in the Hall of the Five Hundred.

At the Palazzo, Langdon meets a guide of the museum, Marta Alvarez, who recognizes him, having met him and Ignazio Busoni, the director of Il Duomo, the previous night, when she showed them Dante's death mask. Langdon asks to see the mask again in order to retrace his steps but they find the mask gone, and security footage shows Langdon and Busoni stealing the mask. Fleeing, Langdon and Sienna listen to a message left by Busoni, referring to "Paradise 25".

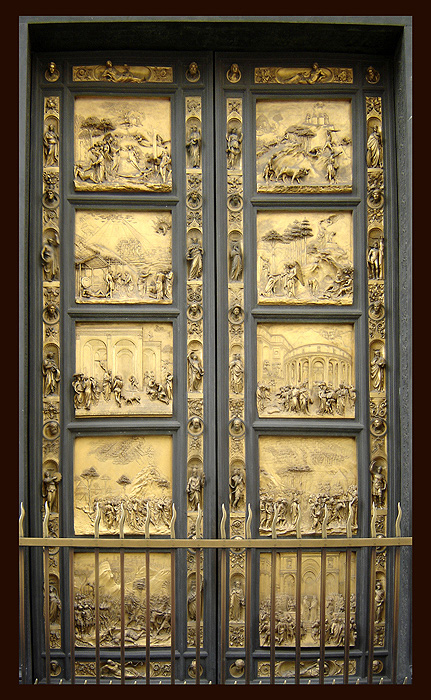
Gates of Paradise at Florence Baptistry

Langdon and Brooks escape the guards but the soldiers arrive, and chase them across the attic. Vayentha also arrives, and while she attempts to shoot Langdon, Brooks pushes her to her death. Langdon connects the phrase "Paradise 25" to the Florence Baptistry, where they find the Dante mask containing a hidden riddle from its current owner, a billionaire geneticist named Bertrand Zobrist. Brooks explains that Zobrist was a geneticist who advocated the halting of humanity's growth, and that he was rumored to be working on an engineered disease to do so.

Ferris, an agent keeping track of Langdon, follows them in and helps them escape the soldiers. They follow the riddle solution to Venice. Brooks punches Ferris in his damaged ribs, with Brooks claiming he is suffering from massive internal bleeding, causing Langdon to suspect Ferris has been infected with Zobrist's plague. Langdon is captured by a group of soldiers while Brooks escapes.

Langdon is taken to Dr. Elizabeth Sinskey, the director-general of the WHO. She explains that Zobrist, who committed suicide the week before, had supposedly developed a new biological plague in order to solve the problem of the world's impending overpopulation, citing the Doomsday Argument. Sinskey raided Zobrist's safe deposit box, found the cylinder, and flew Langdon to Florence to follow the clues; however, he stopped communicating with Sinskey after meeting with Alvarez and Ignazio, and the WHO feared he betrayed them and was working with Zobrist. The soldiers were the WHO's emergency response team, and were not meant to kill him.

Zobrist had paid a shadowy consulting group "The Consortium" to protect the cylinder until a certain date. He also left a video filled with disturbing Dante imagery, and then showed a picture of the plague container kept in a hidden underwater location. It is a slowly dissolving bag. The video claims that the world will be changed the following morning. When Sinskey retrieved it, the Consortium abducted Langdon and staged every event up to this point, to motivate him to solve it.

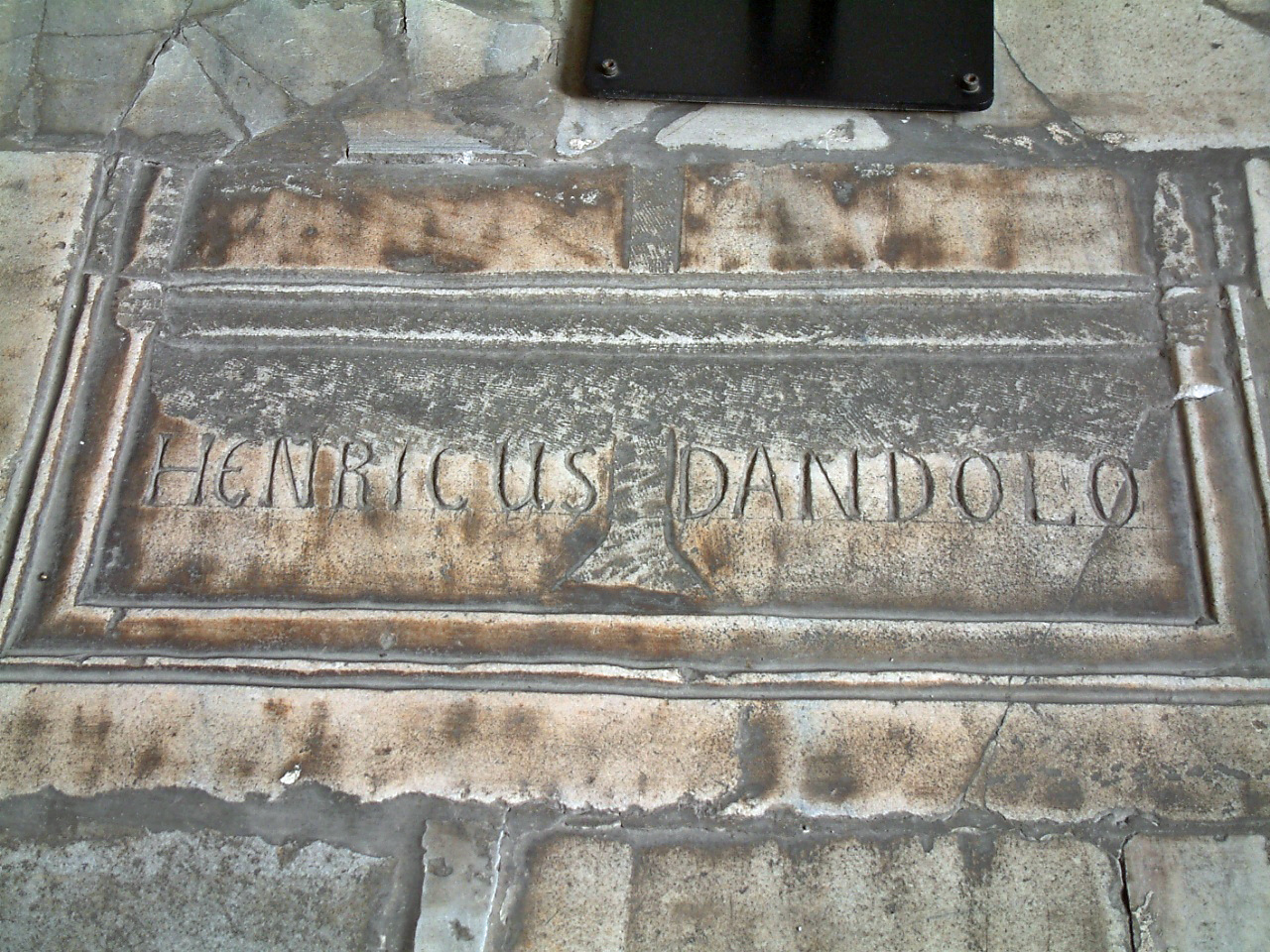
Tomb of Enrico Dandolo, at the Hagia Sophia

Brooks goes rogue and The Consortium realizes she was a secret supporter and lover of Zobrist. She learned where the plague was being kept after Langdon extracted the text from Dorè's illustration Dandolo Preaching the Crusade at St. Mark's Basilica and acquires a private jet to get to the Plague. Langdon, the WHO, and The Consortium team up to stop her. After watching Zobrist's video, they conclude that the bag containing the plague will be fully dissolved by the date the video specifies and that Zobrist's clues point to its location: the Hagia Sophia in Istanbul. They find the plague is in the Cistern but discover Brooks already there. The bag that held the plague had already been broken, spreading to the world via visiting tourists. Brooks runs out of the Cistern, causing panicked tourists to stampede, while Langdon gives chase.

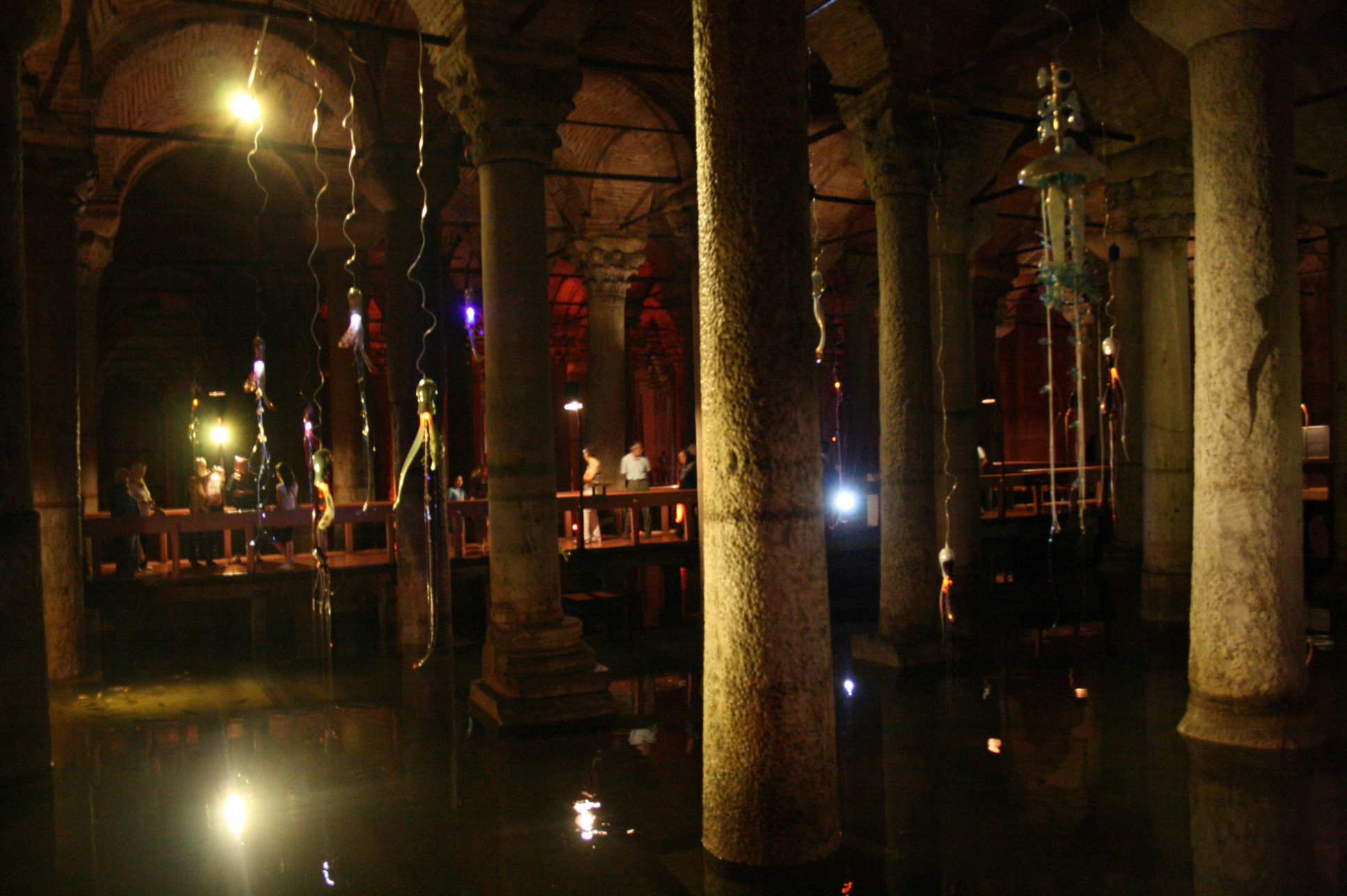
Inside Basilica Cistern, with water below and tourists above

Despite almost escaping, Brooks returns and reveals that the bag had already dissolved one week earlier. The date specified in Zobrist's video was the mathematical calculation of when the entire world would be infected, which has already happened. The plague that Zobrist created is revealed to be a vector virus that randomly activates to employ DNA modification to cause sterility in one third of humans. Brooks reveals that she was trying to stop the virus herself, distrusting the WHO, fearing the virus would be weaponized if they found it. The leader of The Consortium tries to escape WHO custody but is caught later. Brooks receives amnesty in exchange for working with the WHO to address the crisis, since she has extensive knowledge of Zobrist's research and work.

== Characters ==
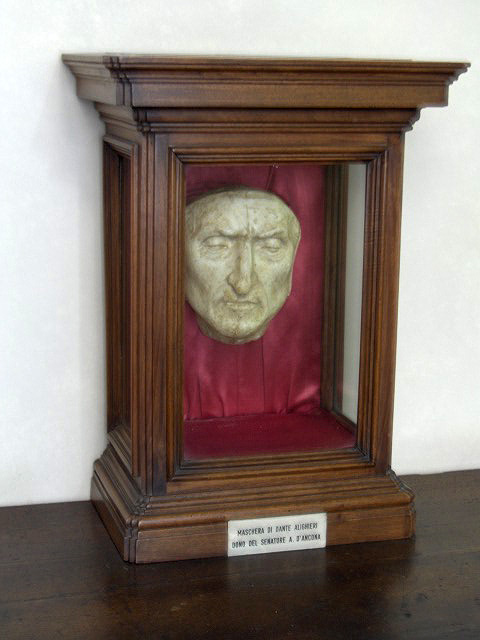
The mask of Dante Alighieri, in Palazzo Vecchio, Florence

- Robert Langdon: An American professor of symbology at Harvard University, Cambridge, Massachusetts and protagonist of the novel.
- Sienna Brooks: A doctor and Zobrist's former lover who works for The Consortium and secondary antagonist. She helps Langdon find the virus Zobrist created, but her past relationship with Zobrist makes her loyalty to Langdon suspicious until the end of the novel. She was a loyal disciple of Zobrist until she reads his last letter and decides to get his new technology before it can fall into the wrong hands. She believes the World Health Organization will cooperate with other government agencies to use Zobrist's new virus for weapons. She uses The Consortium and Langdon to follow the Map of Hell and get to ground zero before everyone else, but realizes that Zobrist had set off a futile search as he released his virus well beforehand.
- Bertrand Zobrist: A transhumanist genius scientist who is obsessed with Dante's Inferno and a primary antagonist of the novel. He is intent on solving the world's overpopulation problem by releasing a virus.
- Elizabeth Sinskey: The head of the World Health Organization who hires Langdon to find Zobrist's virus. She became infertile after taking steroids to help with her childhood asthma attacks and as such is emotionally invested in Zobrist's method of controlling world population.
- Cristoph Brüder: Head of the SRS team (part of the European Centre for Disease Prevention and Control) who is ordered by Sinskey to find Langdon after she loses contact with him.
- The Provost: The head of The Consortium. He tries to bring to fruition Zobrist's wishes by securing the location of the virus from Langdon and Sinskey and scheduling to release to the media a video Zobrist made before his death. When he learns that he was helping Zobrist in a bio-terrorist attack, he helps the World Health Organization to search for the weapon. He is eventually arrested for his part in the events.
- Vayentha: The Consortium's agent in Florence who has orders to follow Langdon but is later disavowed after failing her mission. She falls to her death after a confrontation with Langdon and Brooks in the Palazzo Vecchio.
- Jonathan Ferris: An agent of The Consortium who pretends to be in league with the World Health Organization. He used fake eyebrows and a mustache to act as Dr. Marconi in the beginning of the novel. He had been ordered to detain Brooks.
- Marta Alvarez: An employee at the Palazzo Vecchio in Florence who assists Langdon with Dante's death mask. She is pregnant with her first child.
- Ignazio Busoni: The obese director of Il Duomo in Florence, nicknamed "il Duomino", who assists Langdon with Dante's death mask. He succumbs to a heart attack prior to the events of the novel.
- Ettore Vio: The curator of St. Mark's basilica in Venice.
- Mirsat: A tour guide of Hagia Sophia in Istanbul.

== Marketing ==
Brown released the book's title on his website on January 15, 2013, after prompting readers to help reveal a digital mosaic using social media posts, and revealed the cover in late February 2013. The cover depicts the famous Basilica di Santa Maria del Fiore located in Florence, Italy. He also published the first chapter of Inferno along with a free ebook of The Da Vinci Code on March 17. The ebook was distributed for free to readers worldwide through online e-book stores like Amazon, Google Play and Barnes & Noble until March 24, 2013. Transworld publishers, the official UK publisher of Dan Brown books, have also released the official book trailer through YouTube and others.

Inferno has been translated into French, Russian, Turkish, Greek, German, Dutch, Spanish, Catalan, Italian, Czech, Portuguese, Finnish, Norwegian, Swedish and Danish for simultaneous release. The publishers hired a team of 11 translators who worked on the project at the headquarters of Mondadori in Milan between February and April 2013. They were reportedly sequestered in a basement, and worked intensively under strict security and secrecy, which inspired the 2019 film by Régis Roinsard. It has been also translated into Persian by Afraz Publication, 3 months after first publishing. The book was translated into Bosnian, Serbian, Croatian and Azerbaijani and released simultaneously in January 2014.

== Film ==
Sony Pictures announced a film adaptation would be released on October 14, 2016, with Ron Howard as director, David Koepp adapting the screenplay and Tom Hanks reprising his role as Robert Langdon. On December 2, 2014, Felicity Jones was set to star in the film as Sienna Brooks. Indian actor Irrfan Khan was cast as The Provost. Danish actress Sidse Babett Knudsen was added to the cast as Elizabeth Sinskey. Filming began on April 27, 2015, in Venice, Italy, and wrapped up on July 21, 2015. The first half of film is mostly faithful to the novel, deviating significantly toward the end, specifically that Langdon and his team arrive at the baths in time to prevent the release of the virus rather than arriving a week after it was deployed.

== Reception ==
=== Critical reception ===
Inferno received mixed reviews from critics. The New York Times praised the book as being "jampacked with tricks" and said that Langdon is on "one of those book-length scavenger hunts that Mr. Brown creates so energetically." The New York Daily News reviewed the book favorably, calling it a book of "harrowing fun threaded with coded messages, art history, science, and imminent doom." The Boston Globe's Chuck Leddy compared the book favorably to Brown's previous works, and deemed it "the kind of satisfying escapist read that summers were made for."

Other reviews were more negative. James Kidd of The Independent panned Brown's awkward prose but expressed approval of the book's plot, writing: "Brown's fusion of gothic hyperbole with a pedant's tour-guide deliberately restrains the imagination through its awkward awfulness." Samra Amir of The Express Tribune was critical of the novel's predictability and malapropism, but noted that "Brown's art reigns over boredom. He manages to keep the reader glued." Writing for The Guardian, Peter Conrad dismissed the book's content as "conspiratorial farrago" and further elaborated: "Inferno is also dreadful, abounding in malapropisms and solecisms, leaden restatements of the obvious and naive disinformation about the reality outside the bat-thronged belfry that is Brown's head."

=== Response from Filipinos ===
The novel received backlash from Filipinos after a character named Sienna Brooks, narrating through flashbacks, recounts being sexually assaulted in a Manila slum after volunteering in a humanitarian mission in the Philippines. In this flashback, the character described the capital as "the gates of hell". Several authorities expressed their disappointment over the grim and graphic representation of the city, in particular then Metropolitan Manila Development Authority chairman Francis Tolentino through a letter of protest sent to the author.

=== Commercial ===
Inferno initially sold 369,000 copies at outlets that report to Nielsen BookScan. It debuted as the #1 bestselling book in the US and was also atop the UK's book charts in its first week in shops, selling 228,961 copies. The book remained #1 on Nielsen BookScan for the week ending May 26, selling 211,000 copies and bringing its two-week total to 580,000. Despite slipping 42% in its second week, Inferno far outpaced the #2 book, Khaled Hosseini's And the Mountains Echoed, which posted a debut of 91,000 copies. Inferno sold more than 6 million copies worldwide to date.
