= The Lost Symbol =

2009 novel by Dan Brown

- Hardcover edition
- Author: Dan Brown
- Language: English
- Series: Robert Langdon #3
- Genre: Crime, mystery, thriller
- Publisher: Doubleday (United States); Transworld (United Kingdom)
- Publication date: September 15, 2009
- Publication place: United States; United Kingdom
- Media type: Print (hardcover & paperback), eBook, audio book
- Pages: 528 hardcover 671 paperback
- ISBN: 978-0385504225 (US) ISBN 978-0593054277 (UK) ISBN 978-0552161237 (Corgi edition)
- Preceded by: The Da Vinci Code
- Followed by: Inferno

The Lost Symbol is a 2009 novel written by American writer Dan Brown. It is a thriller set in Washington, D.C., after the events of The Da Vinci Code, and relies on Freemasonry for both its recurring theme and its major characters. Released on September 15, 2009, it is the third Brown novel to involve the character of Harvard University symbologist Robert Langdon, following 2000's Angels & Demons and 2003's The Da Vinci Code.

The Lost Symbol had a first printing of 6.5 million (5 million in North America, 1.5 million in the UK), the largest in Doubleday history. On its first day the book sold one million in hardcover and e-book versions in the U.S., the UK and Canada, making it the fastest selling adult novel in history. It was number one on the New York Times Best Seller list for hardcover fiction for the first six weeks of its release, and remained on the list for 29 weeks. As of January 2013, there were 30 million copies in print worldwide.

== Plot ==
Renowned Harvard symbologist Robert Langdon is invited to give a lecture at the United States Capitol, apparently at the invitation of his mentor, a 33rd degree Mason named Peter Solomon, who is the head of the Smithsonian Institution. Solomon has also asked him to bring a small, sealed package which he had entrusted to Langdon years earlier. When Langdon arrives at the Capitol, however, he learns that the invitation he received was not from Solomon, but from Solomon's kidnapper, Mal'akh — posing as Solomon's assistant — who has left Solomon's severed right hand in the middle of the Capitol Rotunda in a recreation of the Hand of Mysteries. Mal'akh then contacts Langdon, charging him with finding both the Mason's Pyramid, which Masons believe is hidden somewhere in Washington, D.C., and the Lost Word, lest Solomon be murdered.

Langdon meets Inoue Sato, the head of the CIA's Office of Security. Sato claims that Mal'akh poses a threat to the national security of the U.S. and that his capture is more important than Peter's rescue, although she refuses to elaborate. Examining Solomon's hand, they discover a clue leading them to Solomon's Masonic altar in a room in the Capitol's sub-basement, where they find a small pyramid lacking a capstone, with an inscription carved into it. Sato then confronts Langdon with the security x-ray taken of his bag when he entered the Capitol which reveals a smaller pyramid in the package Langdon brought in response to the request by the kidnapper posing as Solomon's assistant. Langdon explains that he was unaware of its contents, but Sato, refusing to believe it, attempts to take Langdon into custody. Before she can arrest him, however, she and Capitol Police Chief Trent Anderson are assaulted by Warren Bellamy, the Architect of the Capitol and a Freemason, who then flees with Langdon in the confusion. He later explains to Langdon that he too has been in contact with Mal'akh and wants Langdon's assistance in rescuing Peter.

Mal'akh is revealed to be a Freemason with tattoos covering almost his entire body. He infiltrated the organization in order to obtain an ancient source of power, which he believes Langdon can unlock for him in return for Peter Solomon's life. Several chapters also delve into Mal'akh's history with Peter Solomon: many years earlier, Peter bequeathed a large sum of inheritance money to his rebellious son, Zachary, who then fled the Solomon household and led a reckless life in Europe until he was arrested and imprisoned in Turkey for smuggling drugs. Peter flew to Turkey and was given the chance to obtain his immediate release in exchange for a bribe, but decided to have Zachary extradited in a week's time in order to teach him a lesson about using money to avoid the consequences of one's actions. Zachary was apparently murdered by his cellmate who got his hands on Zachary's fortune and fled to the island of Syros in Greece to lead a luxurious life under the name Andros Dareios. Dareios, however, soon grew tired of his life. Apparently having spoken with Zachary about Solomon's life as a Mason, Dareios broke into Solomon's home to find the pyramid, but accidentally killed Peter's mother Isabel and was in turn shot and left to fall into a frozen river by a vengeful Solomon. Surviving the fall, Dareios nursed himself back to health, covered his scars and eventually his entire body with tattoos and set off on a mission to infiltrate the Freemasons and gain access to their secrets, adopting the name Mal'akh.

As Langdon deals with the events into which he has been thrust, Mal'akh destroys the Smithsonian-sponsored laboratory of Dr. Katherine Solomon, Peter's younger sister, where she has conducted experiments in noetic science. In the process, Mal'akh ambushes and almost kills Katherine in a cat-and-mouse chase, but Katherine manages to escape and meet up with Langdon and Bellamy. Eventually, when cornered by the authorities, Bellamy is forced to give himself up while Langdon and Katherine escape. Both are later apprehended by Sato's team. Following clues regarding Mal'akh's previous identity as Peter Solomon's psychiatrist, Dr. Christopher Abaddon, Sato allows Langdon and Katherine to rush to his mansion to confront him, but Mal'akh ambushes them and murders their CIA escort. Meanwhile, as he is being interrogated by Sato, Bellamy expresses belief that Sato is working with Mal'akh but Sato assures Bellamy that she is also pursuing Mal'akh in the interest of national security and displays evidence that visibly shocks Bellamy.

Mal'akh places Langdon into an airtight sensory deprivation tank, where he interrogates Langdon by slowly filling the tank with liquid. He is able to convince Langdon to decipher the code at the pyramid's base, but continues to fill the tank until Langdon drowns and apparently dies. Mal'akh then ties Katherine to a chair and inserts an open-ended transfusion needle into her arm and leaves her to bleed to death then flees with a weakened Peter Solomon to the Temple Room of the Scottish Rite's House of the Temple. He uses the threat of not calling an ambulance for Katherine as further coercion for Peter's cooperation. Sato leads a team of agents to the mansion after Langdon and Katherine's escort fails to check in and are able to save Katherine's life. After a near-death experience, Langdon is revealed to have survived due to the "water" in the tank actually being breathable oxygenated liquid and the tank being a device for meditation. Sato and Langdon race to the House of the Temple where Mal'akh threatens to release a heavily edited video showing government officials performing secret Masonic rituals (the same video that Sato showed to Bellamy), which without context, appears highly disturbing. Mal'akh forces the Word—the unpronounceable circumpunct—out of Peter and tattoos it on his head on the last portion of unmarked skin on his body. Mal'akh then orders Peter to sacrifice him, as he believes that it is his destiny to become a demonic spirit and lead the forces of evil. When Peter claims that he will do so without hesitation to avenge his son and mother, Mal'akh shocks Peter by revealing that he is actually Zachary Solomon himself, having conspired with the prison warden to fake his death by disfiguring the body of another inmate beyond recognition (at the same time, Katherine and Bellamy discover several photos of Zachary in Greece after his supposed death that show his gradual transformation into Mal'akh). With tears in his eyes, Peter prepares to stab Zachary but ultimately cannot bring himself to do so and drops the knife just as Langdon arrives and tackles him. Director Sato arrives at the Temple in a helicopter, which smashes the Temple's skylight, the shards of which fatally impale Zachary. The CIA then thwart Zachary's plan to transmit the video to several leading media channels using an EMP blast, disabling a cell tower in the network path leading from Zachary's laptop computer. Katherine arrives and she and Langdon then share a tearful reunion with Peter and mourn Zachary's death. Zachary is only briefly able to lament his body's mutilation before dying.

Later, Peter informs Langdon that the circumpunct Zachary tattooed on his head is not the Word. He also informs Katherine that he made back-ups of all of her noetic research data on his own computer, meaning her research can continue. Deciding to take Langdon to the true secret behind the Word, Peter leads him to the room atop the Washington Monument and tells him that the Word—a common Christian Bible, the Word of God—lies in the monument's cornerstone, buried in the ground beneath the monument's staircase. Langdon realizes that the words inscribed in the base of aluminum capstone (Masonic pyramid) atop the Monument spelled out Laus Deo which translate to "Praise God". Peter tells Langdon that the Masons believe that the Bible is an esoteric allegory written by humanity, and that, like most religious texts around the globe, it contains veiled instructions for harnessing humanity's natural God-like qualities—similar to Katherine's noetic research—and is not meant to be interpreted as the commands of an all-powerful deity. This interpretation has been lost amid centuries of scientific skepticism and fundamentalist zealotry. The Masons have (metaphorically) buried it, believing that, when the time is right, its rediscovery will usher in a new era of human enlightenment.

== Publication details ==
The Lost Symbol had been in development for several years; originally expected in 2006, the projected publication date was pushed back multiple times. When officially announced, the hardcopy book was on pre-order lists for months leading up to its release, being heavily ordered both in the United States and Canada. The book was published on September 15, 2009, with an initial print run of 6.5 million copies, the largest first printing in publisher Random House's history. Electronic versions such as eBook and Audible book versions were also made available on the same date. The American release audio book was read by Paul Michael, who also performed the audio book for The Da Vinci Code.

The book immediately broke sales records, becoming the fastest selling adult-market novel in history, with over one million copies sold on the first day of release. By the end of the first week, a total of two million copies had been sold in the U.S., Canada, and UK. According to the publisher, the rapid sales prompted the printing of an additional 600,000 hardcover copies to the 5 million initially printed for the American market. On its first day the book became the #1 bestseller on Amazon.com, and the Amazon Kindle e-reader edition became the top-selling item on Amazon.com, outselling Amazon's sales of the hardback copy of the novel, which is the sixth best-selling book of 2009 on pre-publication orders alone. The Lost Symbol also ranked as the #1 bestseller in Amazon's Canadian and British sites. Both Barnes & Noble and Waterstone's reported the book has broken all previous records for adult fiction in the United Kingdom. According to Nielsen BookScan data, 550,946 copies of The Lost Symbol were sold in its first week of sale, taking $7.49 million. By the end of the second sales week, Transworld intended to have 1.25 million copies printed.

By September 25, the book ranked No. 1 in the New York Times Best Seller list for hardcover fiction.

=== Reception ===
The New York Times praised the book as being "impossible to put down" and claimed Brown is "bringing sexy back to a genre that had been left for dead." Nevertheless, it noted the overuse of certain phrases and italics, as well as the lack of logic behind characters' motivations. It also likened Inoue Sato to Jar Jar Binks. Los Angeles Times said, "Brown's narrative moves rapidly, except for those clunky moments when people sound like encyclopedias." Newsweek called the book "contrived", saying that to get through The Lost Symbol, just like The Da Vinci Code, it was necessary to swallow a lot of coincidences, but the book was still a page-turner, and that Brown "is a maze maker who builds a puzzle and then walks you through it. His genius lies in uncovering odd facts and suppressed history, stirring them together into a complicated stew and then saying, what if?'" The National Post's review called it a "heavy-handed, clumsy thriller" and that the character of the villain (Mal'akh) "bears an uncomfortably close similarity" to the Francis Dolarhyde character in Thomas Harris' 1981 novel Red Dragon. The Daily Telegraph said the novel was "not quite the literary train-wreck expected". Time said the plot was fun, if bruising, but "It would be irresponsible not to point out that the general feel, if not all the specifics, of Brown's cultural history is entirely correct. He loves showing us places where our carefully tended cultural boundaries — between Christian and pagan, sacred and secular, ancient and modern — are actually extraordinarily messy."

Novelist William Sutcliffe's review in the Financial Times panned the book as "a novel that asks nothing of the reader, and gives the reader nothing back", adding that it "is filled with cliché, bombast, undigested research and pseudo-intellectual codswallop". The digested read by John Crace in The Guardian ends with Robert Langdon begging Dan Brown "Please don't wheel me out again." Slovene philosopher and cultural critic Slavoj Žižek described the book as "a candidate for the worst novel ever".

== Adaptation ==
=== Cancelled film ===
Following the worldwide successes of The Da Vinci Code in 2006 and Angels & Demons in 2009, which were both based on Brown's novels, starring Tom Hanks as Robert Langdon and produced and directed by Ron Howard, Columbia Pictures began production on a film adaptation of The Lost Symbol. Hanks and Howard were expected to return for the film adaptation of The Lost Symbol, along with the franchise's producers Brian Grazer and John Calley. Sony Pictures eventually hired three screenwriters for the project, beginning with Steven Knight and then hiring Brown himself. In March 2012, Danny Strong was also hired to collaborate on the adaptation. Howard had eventually bowed out of directing, and Mark Romanek was being looked at to replace him.

According to a January 2013 article in Los Angeles Times, the final draft of the screenplay was due sometime in February, with pre-production expected to start in the mid-2013. In July 2013, Sony Pictures announced that, instead of The Lost Symbol, they would adapt Dan Brown's 4th novel, Inferno as a film for an October 14, 2016 release date with Howard as director, David Koepp adapting the screenplay and Hanks reprising his role as Robert Langdon.

=== Television series ===
In June 2019, the project was announced to be re-conceived as a television series tentatively titled Langdon. The series was to serve as a prequel to the film series, with Dan Dworkin and Jay Beattie serving as co-creators, showrunners and executive producers. Dan Brown, Ron Howard, Brian Grazer, Francie Calfo, Samie Falvey and Anna Culp were additional executive producers. The show was a co-production between Imagine Television Studios, CBS Studios, and Universal Television Studios, and was ordered to series on NBC. In March 2021, it was announced that the series had been picked up to series by Peacock.

In January 2022, the series was canceled after one season.

== See also ==
- Lynne McTaggart, cited in the novel as a source of inspiration for Katherine Solomon
- Almas Temple, Shriner temple and location in the story
- Elonka Dunin, American cryptologist whose name was anagrammatized to become the character Nola Kaye
