= Angels & Demons =

2000 novel by Dan Brown

- First edition cover
- Author: Dan Brown
- Language: English
- Series: Robert Langdon #1
- Genre: Mystery-thriller
- Publication date: 1 May 2000
- Publication place: United States; United Kingdom
- Media type: Print (hardback & paperback)
- Pages: 768
- ISBN: 0-671-02735-2 (US) / 9780552160896 (UK)
- OCLC: 52990309
- Dewey Decimal: 813/.54 21
- LC Class: PS3552.R685434 A82 2000
- Followed by: The Da Vinci Code

Angels & Demons is a 2000 best-selling mystery-thriller novel written by American author Dan Brown and published by Pocket Books and then by Corgi Books. The novel introduces the character Robert Langdon, who recurs as the protagonist of Brown's subsequent novels. Angels & Demons shares many stylistic literary elements with its sequels, such as conspiracies of secret societies, a single-day time frame, and the Catholic Church. Ancient history, architecture, and symbology are also heavily referenced throughout the book. A film adaptation was released on May 15, 2009.

== Background ==
The book contains several ambigrams created by real-life typographer John Langdon. Besides the "Angels & Demons" and "Illuminati" designs, the title of the book is also presented as an ambigram on the hardcover book jacket, and on the inside cover of the paperback versions. The book also contains ambigrams of the words Earth, Air, Fire, and Water, which served to bring the art of ambigrams to public attention by virtue of the popularity of the book. The "Illuminati Diamond" mentioned in the book is an ambigram of the four elements that are arranged in the shape of a diamond.

== Plot ==
Father Leonardo Vetra, one of CERN's top physicists who has discovered how to create antimatter, is murdered, his chest branded with an ambigram of the word "Illuminati", an ancient anti-religious organization thought extinct. CERN director Maximilian Kohler calls Vetra's adopted daughter, Vittoria, and Harvard University professor Robert Langdon, an expert on symbology and religious history, for help. After determining the ambigram is authentic, they discover that a canister of antimatter from Leonardo's lab has been stolen and will explode in 24 hours when the canister's battery runs out. Langdon and Vittoria go to Vatican City, where four Preferiti, the Cardinals who are the favorite candidates for Pope, are kidnapped by the Hassassin, who plans to blow up the Vatican with the antimatter canister and kill the four cardinals under the orders of "Janus", the leader of the Illuminati.

Believing that the four cardinals will be ritually murdered on the four Altars to Science, of the "Path of Illumination", Langdon and Vittoria follow a series of clues left in various churches in and around Rome. After finding the first two men dead (one suffocated by earth at Santa Maria del Popolo and another whose lungs were punctured on St Peter's Square), they confront the assassin in the act of murdering the third. However, they fail to save the third cardinal and, as the location, Santa Maria della Vittoria, catches fire, the assassin renders Vittoria unconscious and kidnaps her. Langdon also fails to save the last cardinal, who is drowned in the Fontana dei Quattro Fiumi. He still determines the answer to the last sign and is able to confront the Hassassin in the Castel Sant'Angelo, the Church of Illumination. Langdon frees Vittoria and together they send the assassin falling several hundred feet to his death.

Meanwhile, Kohler has read Vetra's journals and knows who Janus is. He arrives to confront Camerlengo Carlo Ventresca, the late pope's closest aide. Fearing Kohler is Janus, Langdon and Vittoria hurry back to St. Peter's Basilica. Kohler has persuaded Ventresca to meet behind closed doors in the papal apartment. Langdon and Vittoria arrive in the nick of time, but Kohler and Ventresca are already meeting. One of them screams behind the closed and locked doors. The Swiss Guards, followed by Langdon and Vittoria, are able to intervene as Kohler is pointing a gun at the branded Ventresca. They open fire on Kohler when they burst through the doors. Just before he dies, Kohler gives Langdon a mini video camera which has recorded his confrontation with Ventresca.

Still unable to find the canister and with the people in the square refusing to vacate, Ventresca runs out to stand before them. Speaking to the sky, speaking to God, he acts as if he's been given a message. With Langdon, Vittoria, and several Swiss Guards in pursuit, Ventresca ventures into the catacombs and finds the canister atop the tomb of Saint Peter. Ventresca takes the canister to a waiting helicopter, handing it to a guard as he gets in to set up for his departure. When he turns to take the canister back, Langdon has climbed in with the canister and tells Ventresca to take off. With no way out of the predicament of having a passenger, Ventresca guides the helicopter up into the sky. Thinking they are heading toward an abandoned quarry a safe distance away, Langdon is surprised when Ventresca takes the canister and locks it inside a box mounted to the helicopter's floor. He then jumps out with the only parachute on board. Langdon, realizing what is about to happen, takes a tarp in the back seat of the helicopter and jumps out using it as a parachute. His rate of descent is still too fast, but he is able to survive because the chute slows him just enough to land in the water of the Tiber River. He is found, very nearly drowned, and taken to a nearby hospital where he is resuscitated. Meanwhile, Ventresca has landed and appears over the crowd, standing on the top of the rotunda alive and slightly bruised.

Reacting to this "miracle", the cardinals debate whether to elect Ventresca as the new Pope. Meanwhile, Langdon returns to the Vatican and has watched the video that Kohler recorded secretly. He learns from the video that Ventresca himself is Janus. Ventresca confesses to Kohler that he poisoned the pope upon the pope's revelation that he had fathered a child and opposes Vetra's attempt to bridge science and God. Under the guise of Janus, he recruited the Hassassin to kill Vetra, steal the antimatter, and kidnap and murder the Preferiti as part of a false flag attack, using the Illuminati, to rally the Catholic Church behind himself and discredit scientific advancement of the kind which had made the antimatter weapon possible. He shows the entire College of Cardinals the video to watch for themselves.

Cardinal Saverio Mortati, Dean of the College of Cardinals, reveals that Ventresca is in fact the late Pope's biological son, conceived with a nun through artificial insemination. Lost in his now obvious insanity, Ventresca soaks himself in oil and sets himself on fire on the balcony of the papal apartment, before a crowd of onlookers in St. Peter's Square. Mortati is unanimously elected pope by the cardinals, and Langdon and Vittoria reunite at Hotel Bernini where they spend the night together. Mortati bequeaths the Illuminati's final brand to Langdon for his research, with the implicit request he restores it in his final will.

== Inaccuracies ==
The book's first edition contained numerous inaccuracies of location of places in Rome, as well as incorrect uses of Italian language. Some of the language issues were corrected in the following editions.

Aside from the explicit introduction, the book depicts various fictional experts explaining matters in science, technology, and history in which critics have pointed out inaccuracies. An example of this is the antimatter discussions, wherein the book suggests that antimatter can be produced in useful and practical quantities and will be a limitless source of power. CERN published a FAQ page about Angels & Demons on their website stating that antimatter cannot be used as an energy source because creating it takes more energy than it produces.

Angels & Demons Decoded, a documentary on the American cable television network, The History Channel, premiered on May 10, 2009, shortly before the release of the novel's film adaptation. The documentary explores the various bases of the novel's story, as well as its inaccuracies. A CERN official, for example, points out that over the last 20 years, approximately 10 billionths of a gram of antimatter had been produced at the facility, whose explosive yield is equivalent to that of a firecracker, far less than is needed for it to be the threat depicted in the novel, where the device holds 0.25 grams.

According to The Boston Globe language columnist Ben Zimmer, the position of Devil's Advocate, which is indicated in the novel to have a role in the selection of the pope, is in fact employed to present arguments against the proposed canonization of a person as a saint (which frequently is the case with former popes). While the background of papal candidates are presumably scrutinised, there is no particular office and not one bearing this title. Zimmer adds that the office was abolished by Pope John Paul II in 1983, 17 years before the novel was published. Further, election through acclamation, which plays a role in the climax of the novel, was in fact a method of electing the pope, but was abolished in 1996 by Pope John Paul II, four years before the novel.

== See also ==
- Draper–White thesis
- Particle accelerators in popular culture
- Gian Lorenzo Bernini

== Sources ==
- Burstein, Dan (ed). Secrets of Angels & Demons: The unauthorized guide to the bestselling novel, 2004, CDS Books. ISBN 1-59315-140-3, Collection of many essays by world-class historians and other experts, discussing the fact & fiction of the novel
- Angels and Demons Draws Tourists to Rome, January 20, 2005, NPR
- CERN's own page about fact and fiction in the novel
- Angels and Demons Movie News Site
- Path of Illumination (with photos of the places of Angels & Demons)
- Dan Brown's own page
- Book 'Antimatter, The Ultimate Mirror' ISBN 978-0-521-89309-1
