= Mahasankatey Shonku =

Professor Shonku series book written by Satyajit Ray

- Mahasankatey Shonku front cover
- Author: Satyajit Ray
- Illustrator: Satyajit Ray
- Language: Bengali
- Series: Professor Shonku
- Genre: Science fiction
- Publisher: Ananda Publishers
- Publication date: 1977
- Publication place: India

Mahasonkote Shonku (Shonku in Deep Peril) is a Professor Shonku series book written by Satyajit Ray and published by Ananda Publishers in 1977. Ray wrote the stories about Professor Shanku for Bengali magazines Sandesh and Anandamela. This book is a collection of three Shonku stories.

== Stories ==
- Shonku'r Shanir Dasha (Anandamela, Autumn 1976),
- Shonku'r Subarna Sujog (Sandesh, April, May and June 1977),
- Hypnogen (Sandesh, April, May and June 1976)

== See also ==
- Shabash Professor Shonku
- Punashcha Professor Shonku
- Professor Shonkur Kandokarkhana
