= Shonku Ekai Aksho =

1983 short story collection by Satyajit Ray

- Professor Shonkur Kandokarkhana front cover
- Author: Satyajit Ray
- Illustrator: Satyajit Ray
- Language: Bengali
- Series: Professor Shonku
- Genre: Science fiction
- Publisher: Ananda Publishers
- Publication date: 1983
- Publication place: India

Shonku Ekai Aksho (Shonku, All in All) is a Professor Shonku series book written by Satyajit Ray and published by Ananda Publishers in 1983. Ray wrote the stories about Professor Shanku for Bengali magazines Sandesh and Anandamela. This book is a collection of four Shonku stories.

== Stories ==
- Mahakasher Doot (Anandamela, Autumn 1979),
- Shonku'r Congo Abhijan. (Anandamela, Autumn 198 1),
- Nakurbabu o El Dorado (Anandamela, Autmnn 1980),
- Professor Shonku o UFO (Anandamela, Autumn, 1982)

== See also ==
- Punashcha Professor Shonku
- Selam Professor Shonku
