= Swayang Professor Shonku =

Professor Shonku series book written by Satyajit Ray

- Swayang Professor Shonku front cover
- Author: Satyajit Ray
- Illustrator: Satyajit Ray
- Language: Bengali
- Series: Professor Shonku
- Genre: Science fiction
- Publisher: Ananda Publishers
- Publication date: 1980
- Publication place: India

Swayang Professor Shonku (None other than Professor Shonku) is a Professor Shonku series book written by Satyajit Ray and published by Ananda Publishers in 1980. Ray wrote the stories about Professor Shanku in Bengali magazines Sandesh and Anandamela. This book is a collection of three Shonku stories.

== Stories ==
- Monro Dweeper Rahasya (Anandamela, Autumn 1977),
- Compu (Anandamela, Autumn 1978),
- Ek Shringa Abhijan, (Sandesh, December 1973 April 1974)

== See also ==
- Mahasankatey Shonku
- Punashcha Professor Shonku
