= Paulami Sengupta =

Indian poet and editor

- Born: 1969; Jamalpur, Bihar, India
- Died: 17 October 2018 (aged 49); Kolkata, West Bengal, India
- Education: St. Xavier's College; Jadavpur University
- Occupations: Writer, Magazine Editor, Journalist, Poet
- Organization(s): Anandamela, Unish Kuri, Desh, Sananda (editor-in-chief)

Paulami Sengupta (1969 – 17 October 2018) was an Indian poet and the executive editor of Bengali magazines under ABP House in India; including Desh, Sananda, a magazine for grown ups, Anandamela, Unish Kuri and Anandalok.

== Career ==
Sengupta was born in Jamalpur in Bihar. Thereafter she came to Malda district. Sengupta studied in Alipore Multipurpose Girls High School, and entered in St. Xavier's College, Kolkata and Jadavpur University. She translated several literary works from English and Hindi to Bengali language. Her first book of poems Pencil Khuki was published in 1997. She joined as trainee journalist in daily newspaper The Telegraph in 1994. In 2001 she became the chief sub-editor of Anandamela magazine. She also translated Asterix comics series from French to Bengali.

== Death ==
Sengupta died on 17 October 2018 in Kolkata. Paulami Sengupta Memorial Foundation is an initiative taken by her family members.

== Literary works ==
- Amra Aaaj Roomal Chor
- Anandamela Golpo Sankalan (Edited)
- Asterix Comics (Bengali version) (Translator)
- Pencil Khuki
- Pujabarshiki Anandamela Golpo Sankalan (Edited)
- Samanami, Translation of Jhumpa Lahiri's novel The Namesake
- Ulki
- Muthor Map Upche Jeno Pore
