= Aveek Sarkar =

Indian newspaper promoter and proprietor

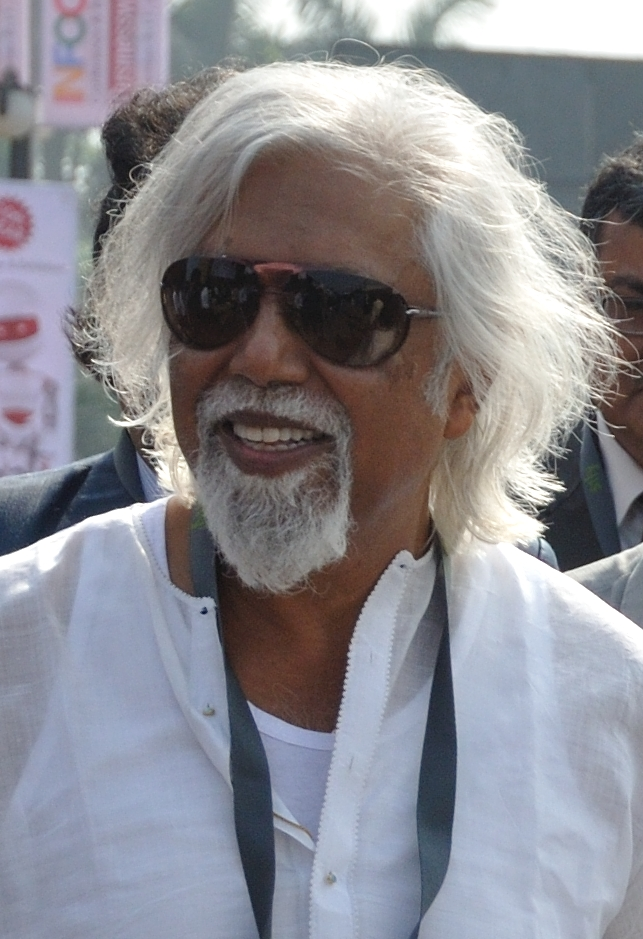
- Sarkar in 2011
- Born: 9 June 1945 (age 81); Kolkata
- Education: University of Calcutta
- Occupation: Journalist
- Organization: ABP Group
- Spouse: Rakhi Sarkar
- Children: Buku Sarkar; Chiki Sarkar
- Parents: Ashok Kumar Sarkar (father); Aloka Sarkar (mother)

Aveek Sarkar (Bengali: অভীক সরকার; born 9 June 1945) is an Indian newspaper promoter and proprietor. He is the present chairman of Press Trust of India and vice chairman and editor emeritus of ABP Group. Previously he was editor-in-chief of Anandabazar Patrika and The Telegraph. He was also the chief editor of ABP Group of publications. He was ranked as one of the most powerful Indians in 2009 by The Indian Express. He played vital roles during the formation of Penguin India, the Indian counterpart of Penguin Books and during the acquisition of STAR News in 2003.

Sarkar spent a year as an understudy to Sir Harold Evans in Britain, taking time to understand what went on at the previous two papers at which Evans had worked – The Northern Echo and the Manchester Evening News – before joining him at The Sunday Times.

== Personal life ==
Sarkar is known to having strong opinions about most issues. He refrains from bringing most of these stances to his business and editorial meetings, according to a profile by Nicholas Coleridge in Paper Tigers.
