= Unish-Kuri =

Indian Bengali magazine for young adults

- Cover of Unish-Kuri, December 2017
- Frequency: fortnightly
- Publisher: ABP Ltd
- First issue: 19 June 2004
- Based in: Kolkata
- Website: Official website

Unish-Kuri is one of the youngest fortnightly magazines published from ABP Ltd, publishers of Anandabazar Patrika and The Telegraph, of Kolkata, India. It took off as a new division or wing of Anandamela, the 33-year-old children's magazine published in Bengali language in Kolkata. Its name literally means "nineteen twenty", and it is targeted at teens and young adults.

== Content ==
Unish-Kuri maintains a colorful outlook. While many magazines are doing away with fiction, Unish Kuri has established its romantic fiction section strongly among its readers. Also popular among its readers is fiction falling under thriller genre. Unish Kuri also publishes serial novels.

== Select writers ==
- Sunil Gangopadhyay
- Samaresh Majumdar
- Suchitra Bhattacharya
- Paulami Sengupta
- Smaranjit Chakraborty
- Pracheta Gupta

== See also ==
- Anandamela
- Anandabazar Patrika
- Ananda Publishers
- List of teen magazines
