= Professor Shonku (short story collection) =

Science fiction book by Satyajit Ray

- Author: Satyajit Ray
- Cover artist: Satyajit Ray
- Language: Bengali
- Series: Professor Shonku
- Genre: Science fiction
- Publication date: 1965
- Publication place: India
- Media type: Print (hardcover)
- Preceded by: None
- Followed by: Professor Shonkur Kandokarkhana

Professor Shonku is a collection of nine science fiction short stories by Satyajit Ray featuring the fictional scientist-inventor Professor Shonku. The collection was first published in 1965 by Calcutta publisher NewScript Publications.

The original collection contained seven stories, while the eight and ninth stories were added in the later editions. Eight of the nine stories were published in the children's magazine Sandesh, while the ninth, "Professor Shonku o Bhoot", was previously published in Ashcharya. The short stories are written in epistolary form, using dated diary entries as a framing device.

== Introduction ==
The first of Professor Shonku's diaries is discovered by Tarak Chatterjee, an amateur (and rather poor) writer, who has a fascination for tiger stories. On hearing that a large meteor had crashed into the Matharia areas of the Sundarbans, he visited the location in search of tiger skin. Failing to find them, he looked around only to find a red notebook inside the meteor's hole (later learned to be the first of Professor Shonku's diaries). This he hands to the editor of Sandesh, who publishes the diary's entries as the first story, "Byomjatrir Diary".

The diary is eaten by fire ants, but the editor visits Professor Shonku's laboratory in Giridih, India, and locates 21 other diaries, which he publishes periodically as stories in his magazine. After the first few stories, the editor stops appearing, and the stories begin with the journal entries themselves, narrated by Shonku directly.

== Synopses of stories ==
=== Byomjatrir Diary ===
A poor author approaches the editor of Sandesh with a journal by Professor Shonku, a scientist who disappeared fifteen years ago. The editor learns from the diary that Shonku, despite being mocked by his neighbour Abinash Chandra Majumdar, was getting prepared for a voyage to Mars. He also invented a robot that he called Bidhushekhar. Later, Shonku, his servant Prahlad, his pet cat Newton, and Bidhushekhar arrive on Mars and are attacked by an army of Martians. They flee from Mars, lose their way in space, and after many days of wandering, finally arrive in Tafa, an unknown planet inhabited by the "first civilized humans of the solar system". Unlike the Martians, the inhabitants of Tafa welcome the strangers and make Shonku their fellow citizen. The editor plans to publish the journal in his magazine, only to discover later that the diary has been destroyed by a swarm of ants.

=== Professor Shonku o Harh ===
Upon the Abinash's insistence, Professor Shonku visits a sadhu in Giridih, who is always seen hanging upside down from a tree, and is known to have the ability to bring dead animals back to life through the power of his spells. When skeletons of dead animals are brought to him, he brings them back to life. Being a scientist and an inventor, Professor Shonku was sure there was hypnotism involved but is stunned to see that the animals are being revived.

Shonku secretly records the spell that the sadhu was chanting. When he tries to play the chant at his laboratory, he only hears ghastly laughter. Shonku, after seeing the sadhu angrily glaring at him, realizes that the sadhu somehow learned about his plan. The sadhu disappears from Giridih the next day.

That incident gives Shonku an interest in bones, and after seeing what he suspected were the bones of a brontosaur in a neighbour's house, he visits the forests of the Nilgiris, where his neighbour had found the bones. He finds the bones of the brontosaur in a remote cave. After retrieving and studying the bones, one night Shonku sees the sadhu chanting the same spell as he used to in Giridih. The brontosaur is revived and starts munching on the tree where the sadhu was hanging. The sadhu tries to chant a reverse spell to change it back to its skeleton form, but just as he completes the spell, he is crushed to death underneath the bones of the dinosaur.

=== Professor Shonku O Macaw ===
Shonku describes his experience with Professor Gajanan Tarafdar, who is an unscrupulous scientist that loves to profit off of other scientists' work.

While Shonku was busy with creating an invisibility potion, Tarafdar interrogates Shonku. When Shonku gets distracted by a piece of mail, Tarafdar starts reading Shonku's notebook that contains his experiments and formulae. Shonku arrives, catches Tarafdar and gets rid of him from his house. Tarafdar visits his house, but Shonku keeps him away from his laboratory to prevent him from reading his notes.

Tarafdar writes a letter to Shonku, challenging him by saying that he will make an invisibility potion before him.

One morning, after returning from a morning walk, Shonku discovers a macaw sitting on the branch of his garden's tree and keeps it.

While experimenting with his invisibility potion one day, Shonku attempts to test the potion on a guinea pig when, to his utter shock, the macaw starts speaking to him in clear Bengali and asks what he is doing. Shonku briefly explains his work to the macaw and when the bird asks about the potion in his hand, Shonku explains what it is and even reveals the formula of the potion. The macaw turns silent when Shonku asks how it learnt Bengali.

Later one night, while returning to his bedroom after having dinner, Shonku hears the macaw murmuring the invisibility potion's formula to itself. Both of them say good night to each other and leave.

One day later, the macaw vanishes from Shonku's house. While entering in his laboratory, Shonku discovers the laboratory window open and the macaw gone. Albeit sad at the macaw's departure, he becomes suspicious about the open window as he clearly remembers that he closed it. In order to get over the sadness, Shonku focuses on his work.

The next month, after Shonku has finished his experiment, an incident happens in his house. After returning from his prolonged morning walk, he sees the main door open and the lock broken and Newton afraid. Hearing sounds coming from his laboratory, Shonku rushes inside and sees that his laboratory has been ransacked in his absence and a bundle of his notebooks flying in the air on their own and going towards the open window. Shonku pounces upon his notebooks and a struggle ensues between him and an invisible person. Shonku succeeds in overpowering the intruder and retrieving his notes, but they try to escape. Another invisible creature arrives and attacks the escaping invisible intruder. Shonku recognizes both of them: Tarafdar and the macaw. Tarafdar manages to escape.

The macaw reveals the entire truth to Shonku: the macaw was part of a Brazilian circus. Tarafdar went to Brazil a few years ago and stole the macaw from there. The macaw, who was already intelligent and proficient in several languages, started living with Tarafdar and learnt Bengali language from him. Tarafdar sent the macaw to infiltrate Shonku's household and collect the invisibility potion's formula. Thinking that the macaw can betray him in the future, and also to suppress his secrets which the macaw knows, Tarafdar tried to kill the bird, after successfully turning himself invisible. The macaw drank Tarafdar's potion, thus saving itself. Giving up on the macaw, Tarafdar arrived in Giridih to break into Shonku's house and steal his notes; unbeknownst to him, the invisible macaw followed him. The story ends with both Shonku and the macaw thanking each other.

=== Professor Shonku o Egyptio Aatonko ===
A person tells Shonku to stop his work on mummies, after which Shonku takes a mummy from his friend and returns it to Giridih.

=== Professor Shonku o Golok Rahasya ===
Abinash leaves his house one morning for a morning walk and finds a small ball lying next to a dead snake on a river bank. Intrigued, he takes the ball.

Shonku invents Microsonograph, a machine capable of hearing and recording inaudible sounds of all kinds. He experiments with it by recording the sound of a rose crying loudly, after tearing a leaf of the flower. Abinash visits Shonku and later shows the ball to him.

One evening, when Shonku is recording the sound of grass being cut, Abinash bursts in and claims that the ball has changed colour several times in one day. He also claims that he stayed awake till late at night to see the shift in color. Shonku dismisses his claims as a hallucination due to sleep deprivation, angering him.

Later, Shonku visits Abinash and finds him writing an article for a newspaper regarding the ball. Abinash asks Shonku to stay in his house to study the ball's colour changes. Shonku accepts and witnesses the ball changing colour and agrees that the ball has some kind of magic.

Later, Abinash discovers some dead insects lying near the ball; scared, he gives it to Shonku. Shonku studies the ball carefully, but cannot reach any conclusions. He is even more puzzled when his cat, Newton turns violent and attempts to destroy the ball. While lying in bed trying to fall asleep, he realizes what the colour-changing actually is: the ball's colour changes resemble the changing of the seasons on Earth. Different colours on the ball represent the different seasons. The only difference is that the ball takes one day for a season change.

Later that night, Shonku wakes up and hears a thin, shrill and low voice calling him by his name. Shonku and Newton go downstairs and enter the laboratory. The sound is coming from the ball and is being recorded by his Microsonograph that he left on.

Shonku hears an alien voice coming from the ball. It claims that they are the inhabitants of the ball and that their planet, named Terratom, is the smallest exoplanet known in the universe. Terratom deflected from its orbit and crashed into Earth. The aliens soon reveal themselves to be highly lethal and extremely dangerous viruses, explaining the presence of the dead snake and the dead insects. The virus-like aliens also claim that they can infect and kill the entire population of Earth within three months. They ask Shonku to release them, as they are suffocating due to lack of air, as Shonku kept the ball inside a small glass chamber. Shonku remains adamant; he stays in his position and does not remove the glass chamber. The virus-like alien population soon suffocates to death. Later, Newton destroys the dead planet with a single touch after Shonku gives it to him as a toy.

=== Professor Shonku o Chi Ching ===
A Chinese magician fails to hypnotize Shonku. After some years, the magician comes to Shonku's house. When the magician leaves the house, Shonku sees a lizard eating his dangerous acids and transforms into a Chinese dragon. Shonku fires his invention, the electric pistol, to slay the dragon, but it does not work. He then loses his senses, and when he regains them, he understands the magician Chi-Ching had hypnotized him.

=== Professor Shonku o Khoka ===
While playing in his house's courtyard, a boy named Khoka slips, falls and injures his own head, after which he undergoes a drastic change and starts speaking gibberish. After several doctors fail to reach a conclusion regarding his condition, Khoka's father meets with Shonku, asking for his help. Though initially uninterested, Shonku reluctantly agrees to see Khoka. During his first meeting with Khoka, the boy nonchalantly reveals the power of Shonku's spectacles, utterly shocking him.

After studying Khoka for some time, Shonku learns that the gibberish uttered by Khoka are actually scientifically intricate formulae and information which Khoka has no possible way of learning, and starts displaying psychic abilities.

After Khoka garners local attention, journalists and reporters start flocking around Shonku's house to have an interview with the boy. With his psychic skills, Khoka causes a reporter's camera to malfunction, and starts speaking in foreign languages to evade the journalist's questions. Shonku quickly brings the event to an end when Khoka grows tired.

One night, Shonku wakes up from his sleep and discovers Khoka gone from his bed. He sees him working in the laboratory with chemicals. Shonku attempts to stop Khoka, but Khoka threatens to injure him if he tries to interrupt. After a long and stressful moment, Khoka finally concocts a potion using some of Shonku's dangerous chemicals and consumes it, after which he loses consciousness.

Khoka inexplicably reverts to normal in the morning. Shonku escorts him back home, and Khoka's parents are quite delighted to see their son become normal again.

=== Professor Shonku o Bhoot ===
Shonku creates a headwear and names it Neo-Spectroscope, which allows him to meet with the ghosts of deceased people. He experiments it by communicating with the ghost of his dead friend, Professor Archibald Ackroyd.

People, including Abinash Chandra Majumdar, start to see Shonku roaming around Giridih. When they call him, he ignores them and leaves. This news shocks Shonku, as he never left the house during those times. Prahlad claims to have seen Shonku late one night working in the laboratory when the real Shonku was sleeping in his bedroom. Shonku becomes worried and starts to think that he is doing all these things unconsciously without remembering anything. Later one night, Shonku sees "himself" sitting in his garden's deck chair.

The man whom everyone presumed to be Shonku is actually the ghost of Shonku's great-great-grandfather, Botukeshwar Shonku, a mystic who wanted to meet with him descendent and bless him for his work. After the blessing, Botukeshwar vanishes, never to be seen again.

Later, Abinash meets with Shonku and shows him a photo taken by Abinash's nephew. He claims that Shonku was in the photo but Shonku's image had vanished from the photo. Shonku tells him the truth and asks him to stay and have some coffee.

== Translation ==
Professor Shonku was translated to English by Sukanya Jhaveri in 1981.

Many Professor Shonku stories are part of the collection The Diary of a Space Traveller and other stories, translated by Satyajit Ray and Gopa Majumdar, and published by Puffin Classics in 2004 (ISBN 978-0-14-333581-8).

== Awards ==
Professor Shonku was awarded the Sahitya Akademi Award for Children's Literature in 1967.

== See also ==
- Bengali literature
- Bengali science fiction
- Byomkesh Bakshi
- Byomkesh Bakshi in other media
- Culture of Bengal
- Culture of West Bengal
- Feluda
- Feluda in film
- History of Bengali literature
- Kakababu
- Kakababu in other media
- List of Bengali-language authors (chronological)
- List of Professor Shonku adventures
- Professor Shonku O El Dorado
