= TTI =

TTI can refer to:

- Techtronic Industries, a Hong Kong electrical company
- Texas A&M Transportation Institute, a research agency
- Texas Tennessee Industries, now Igloo Products Corporation
- Transmission Time Interval in digital telecommunication
- Toyota Technological Institute, Japan
- Toyota Technological Institute at Chicago or TTI-Chicago
- TTI, Inc., a distributor of electronics components
- A belt worn with a martial arts dobok
- TTI Telecom, an Operations Support Systems vendor
- Transfusion transmitted infection
- Time temperature indicator of the history of a perishable product
- Travel Technology Interactive, airline software company
- Turbo Technologies Inc., video game and console-making subsidiary of NEC.
- Troubled teen industry
- Text-to-image model in machine learning

== See also ==
- TI (disambiguation)
- TTIS
