= Shabash Professor Shonku =

1974 short story collection by Satyajit Ray

- Shabash Professor Shonku front cover
- Author: Satyajit Ray
- Illustrator: Satyajit Ray
- Language: Bengali
- Series: Professor Shanku
- Genre: Science fiction
- Publisher: Ananda Publishers
- Publication date: 1974
- Publication place: India

Shabash Professor Shonku (Bravo Professor Shonku) is a Professor Shonku series book written by Satyajit Ray and published by Ananda Publishers in 1974. Ray wrote the stories about Professor Shanku in Bengali magazines Sandesh and Anandamela. This book is a collection of seven Shonku stories.

== Stories ==
- Ashcharya Pranee (Sandesh, Autumn 1971),
- Swapnadweep (Sandesh, May and June 1971),
- Moru Rahasya (Sandesh, May and June 1972),
- Corvus (Anandamela, Autumn 1972),
- Dr. Sering er Smaramsakti (Anandamela, Autumn 1974)

== See also ==
- Selam Professor Shonku
- Punashcha Professor Shonku
- Professor Shonkur Kandokarkhana
