= Byomjatrir Diary =

Short story Series by Satyajit Ray

"Byomjatrir Diary (An Astronaut's Diary)"
- Short story by Satyajit Ray
- Original title: ব্যোমযাত্রীর ডায়রি
- Country: India
- Language: Bengali
- Genre(s): Science fiction short story Series

Publication
- Published in: Sandesh
- Publication type: Print (Magazine)
- Publisher: Ananda Publishers, Kolkata (1965)
- Media type: Print (Hardback)
- Publication date: 1965

Chronology
- Series: Professor Shonku
—	Professor Shonku o Egypsio Atonko

"Byomjatrir Diary" (Bengali: ব্যোমযাত্রীর ডায়রি, An Astronauts Diary) is the first story of the Professor Shonku series created by Indian writer and filmmaker Satyajit Ray. It was first published in Sandesh, edited by Ray himself, in 1961. Ray included this story in his first collection of Shonku stories, Professor Shonku, in 1965. The story follows Professor Trilokeshwar Shonku, a Bengali scientist and inventor, who travelled to Mars and after being attacked by the Martians, fled to a planet named Tafa, where the inhabitants welcomed him and made him a citizen of their planet.

In "Byomjatrir Diary", 11 of Professor Shonku's 1093 fictional inventions are mentioned. Most notable of these inventions are a rocket to Mars, Bidhushekhar the Robot and a pill called Botika Indica. Originally the story was not written as a part of the series as Ray did not have any intention to write a sequel of it. The next story of the series was published three years later.

== Plot summary ==
=== Summary ===
A poor and amateur writer named Tarak Chatterjee approaches the nameless Editor of Sandesh with a journal by Professor Shonku (a scientist who had disappeared 15 years ago). Tarak discloses to the Editor that he went to the Sundarbans to collect tiger skin where a meteorite had crashed. According to Tarak, he found the journal inside the hole caused by the meteorite. The intrigued Editor takes the journal home and inadvertently discovers that the journal is indestructible; he unsuccessfully tries to tear it and burn it several times and also discovers that the ink of the writing changes colour, within a matter of seconds. Stunned, the Editor starts reading the story written in the journal. It's a story within a story narrative, written in first-person narration.

Professor Trilokeshwar Shonku is creating a spaceship to go to Mars. He explains that his sudden wish to go to Mars is because of a dream which he saw one night. Later he found several alien plants growing in his yard which, if blown in the air, appear to wave at him as if calling him somewhere.

He even creates a large robot named Bidhushekhar, as a helping hand. His neighbour, Abinash Chandra Majumdar, teases him because of his wish to travel to space, but he turns a deaf ear to him.

After finally creating the spaceship, Shonku, his domestic worker Prahlad, his pet cat Newton, and his robot Bidhushekar, travel to space. While on their way to Mars, Bidhushekhar suddenly tries to steer the spaceship away from Mars; Shonku switches off the robot and redirects the spaceship to Mars.

When the spaceship enters in Mars, Bidhushekhar is switched on, but the robot, afraid due to an unknown reason, refuses to go out. Shonku, Prahlad and Newton the cat go out and explore the planet. While studying rocks beside a river, both Prahlad and Newton the cat come across a small Martian alien. Newton, seemingly provoked, pounces upon the alien and bites it. After the small alien runs away, a much bigger alien arrives and chases both Prahlad and Newton the cat. Shonku, hearing Prahlad's scream and seeing the chase, runs after the alien, intending to save Prahlad and his cat. Suddenly, Bidhushekhar jumps out of the spaceship and hits the alien, hard enough to knock it unconscious.

As the Sun rises, Shonku and Bidhushekhar find out that an entire army of Martians are coming after them. Seeing Bidhushekhar approaching towards them, Shonku runs after him and switches him off. He then divides Bidhushekhar into two halves and drags him into the spaceship, while the Martians gain closer at them. After finally dragging the entirety of Bidhushekhar inside the spaceship, something hits Shonku in the leg, causing him to lose consciousness and fall in the spaceship.

When Shonku wakes up, he finds Bidhushekhar still lying in two halves, Prahlad and Newton the cat lying on the floor in a semi-conscious state and the spaceship flying on its own. Perplexed, Shonku discovers that the controls aren't working and no proper destination is fixed; he's indescribably horrified. The group soon gets lost in outer space.

A few days later, Shonku and Prahlad, upon the insistence of the revived Bidhushekhar, discover that the spaceship is flying through huge unexplained bubbles which are expanding and exploding on their own accord. Some days after that, they see thousands and thousands of streaks of colourful light flying in the space. After that, the spaceship crosses a large asteroid belt. After crossing all these things, the spaceship arrives at Tafa, an unknown planet which, according to Bidhushekhar, is "inhabited by the first civilised people of the Solar System". After arriving in Tafa, Shonku and Prahlad find out—much to their shock—that Tafa's residents are anthropomorphic, benevolent, life-sized ants. Shonku, Newton the cat and Prahlad soon become the residents of the planet, meanwhile Bidhushekar disappears without any trace.

After reading this story, the Editor of Sandesh decides to copy the story from the journal. After copying the aforementioned part of Shonku's story, the Editor returns home from work one day, only to find out that the journal has been destroyed by a swarm of fire ants. The Editor is left visibly stunned.

=== Characters ===
- Professor Trilokeshwar Shonku: The main narrator and protagonist of the story. He's a Bengali scientist who went into space to explore Mars, lost his way while returning and arrived in Tafa, an unknown planet. Since then, he has been living there and subsequently, has vanished from Earth.
- Newton: Shonku's pet cat.
- Prahlad: Shonku's domestic worker and housekeeper who accompanies his master in the space journey.
- Bidhushekhar: A robot created by Shonku for his help. Bidhushekhar later developed artificial intelligence on his own, which amazed Shonku. At the end of the story, he mysteriously vanishes after the group arrives in Tafa.
- Tarak Chatterjee: A poor and amateur author, who regularly publishes short stories in Sandesh magazine.
- The Editor: An unnamed editor of the Sandesh magazine, he narrates only the beginning and the end of the overall story and copies Shonku's story.

== Publication history ==
The story, written and illustrated by Ray, was originally published in Sandesh, a children's magazine from Calcutta, edited by Ray himself, as a serial in monthly instalment that began appearing in September 1961 and continued to November 1961. At the time of writing or serialisation of the story, Ray had no intention to write a sequel of it. The next story of the series, "Professor Shonku o Egypiso Atonko", was published some three years later. Ray included the story in his first collection of Professor Shonku stories, Professor Shonku, in 1965. It was later included in the Shonku Samagra, the complete collection of Professor Shanku stories.
