= Lorai =

Lorai: Play to Live
- Theatrical poster
- Directed by: Parambrata Chatterjee
- Screenplay by: Padmanabha Dasgupta; Parambrata Chatterjee
- Story by: Sabir Hossain Molla
- Produced by: Shyamsundar Dey
- Starring: Prosenjit Chatterjee; Payel Sarkar
- Cinematography: Gopi Bhagat
- Edited by: Bodhaditya Bandopadhyay
- Music by: Indradeep Dasgupta
- Production company: GreenTouch Entertainment
- Release date: 9 January 2015
- Running time: 157 minutes
- Country: India
- Language: Bengali

Lorai: Play to Live is an Indian Bengali-language sports action drama film written and directed by Parambrata Chatterjee. It stars Prosenjit Chatterjee, Payel Sarkar and Indrasish Roy in lead roles. The film was released on 9 January 2015 under the banner of Greentouch Entertainment.

== Synopsis ==
Sebastian Ryan (Prosenjit Chatterjee), an alcoholic ex-football star, is assigned the task of training the youths of a remote violence-torn village in Purulia. Though he is very sceptical about the task at the outset, circumstances force him to change his perception.

== Cast ==
- Prosenjit Chatterjee as Sebastian Ryan
- Payel Sarkar as Anuradha, Ryan's daughter
- Indrasish Roy as Deep Narayan Chowdhury
- Kanchan Mullick as Doha
- Kharaj Mukherjee as Mukhtar Alam
- Gargi Roychowdhury as Mukhtar's young sister
- Deepankar De as Sports Minister Balai Bhowmik
- Biswajit Chakraborty as Ryan's best friend
- Bharat Kaul as Defence Minister Lalit Damle
- Koushik Kar as Chipla
- Rajat Ganguly as Central Home Minister Swapan Maitra
- Alvito D'Cunha (special appearance)
- Apurbo Roy as Haagu
- Parambrata Chatterjee as Naxalite leader Manas (special appearance)
- Joydeep Mukherjee as a member of Indian Army
- June Malia as Ryan's wife

== Release ==
Lorai was slated to release with Ebar Shabor, but the producers of this film backed it by a week to avoid competition.

=== Marketing ===
Greentouch Entertainment released the film's trailer on 2 December 2014 at the presence of the lead cast and the director. The film had a grand premiere at INOX of South City Mall.

=== Controversy ===
Lorai have run into trouble with the censor board. The board has asked the makers to get an NOC from the Animal Welfare Board of India for a chicken chase sequence. Story goes that the makers had not taken a prior NOC, which is mandatory for censoring a film. Says a source close to the unit, "In the synopsis of the film, there was no mention of the sequence and the Animal Welfare Board has raised an objection to it. The film, starring Prosenjit Chatterjee, is set for release this weekend; we are hoping things will be sorted out soon." A representative from the production house is already in Chennai to do the needful. Says Parambrata, "The review committee will look into the sequence featuring chickens.Hope things fall into place."

=== Critical response ===
Reviewer from The Times of India commented Lorai is a good-hearted film that gives us a fair share of drama, humour and, of course, football. And despite our inclination to draw parallels with hits that have similar storylines — like Chak De! India — Lorai still manages to make a good impression.

Neel Dutt of The Telegraph reviewed "Parambrata’s choice of genre as well as his concept set me thinking not just about the film but about contemporary Bengali cinema and its new breed of young filmmakers. It’s actually a breath of freshness to watch a young filmmaker daring to get away from the glossy plastic world of our city to engulf an earthy India far bigger than our provincial smartphone existence. The charm of the film lies in this rusticity, an essence that’s beautifully and painstakingly shot by cinematographer Gopi Bhagat. Kharaj Mukherjee’s ever optimistic and pleasing Mokhtar is the actor’s most pleasant performance since Patalghar. Just when one stopped expecting anything from Kanchan Mullick, he surprises as the chicken thief. His funny ostrich-like Doa with all its oddities and idiosyncrasies will keep you glued till the end. In fact, Doa’s perfectly crafted introduction and climax are two of the most enjoyable sequences in the film.But the surprise of the film lies in its two young actors — Indrasish Roy as Deepnarayan, the rakishly handsome captain of the football team, is stunning. And debutant Kaushik Kar as the quiet and confident Chipla Mahato is brilliant. Both these fine young actors show a lot of promise. I loved the gentle accordion melody accompanied by a stringed instrument used in a couple of scenes after Sebastian Ryan enters Kushumdi."IMDb gave a rating to the film.

== Soundtrack ==
Music Composer Indradeep Dasgupta was roped in to score the music for the film.

Lorai:Play to Live

Soundtrack album
- Genre: Feature film soundtrack
- Director: Indradeep Dasgupta
- Producer: GreenTouch Entertainment

Arijit Singh launched the music of the film was held at a city hotel, with the entire cast and crew in attendance. The soundtrack was ranked Best Bengali Album of March 2015 by Deccan Music

=== Track listing ===
No.	Title	Singer(s)	Length
1.	"Kichhu Kichhu Kotha"	Arijit Singh and Kaushiki Chakrabarty	2:58
2.	"Jonaki"	Angaraag Mahanta	3:26
3.	"Ashchhe Shokal"	Bonnie Chakraborty	2:45
4.	"Chhoto Ekta Bhor"	Mohan Kannan	3:40
5.	"Jekhane Shob Ses"	Timir Biswas	5:28
6.	"Mayar Jeebon Jonaki"	Arijit Singh	5:53
