= Dhritiman Chatterjee =

Indian actor

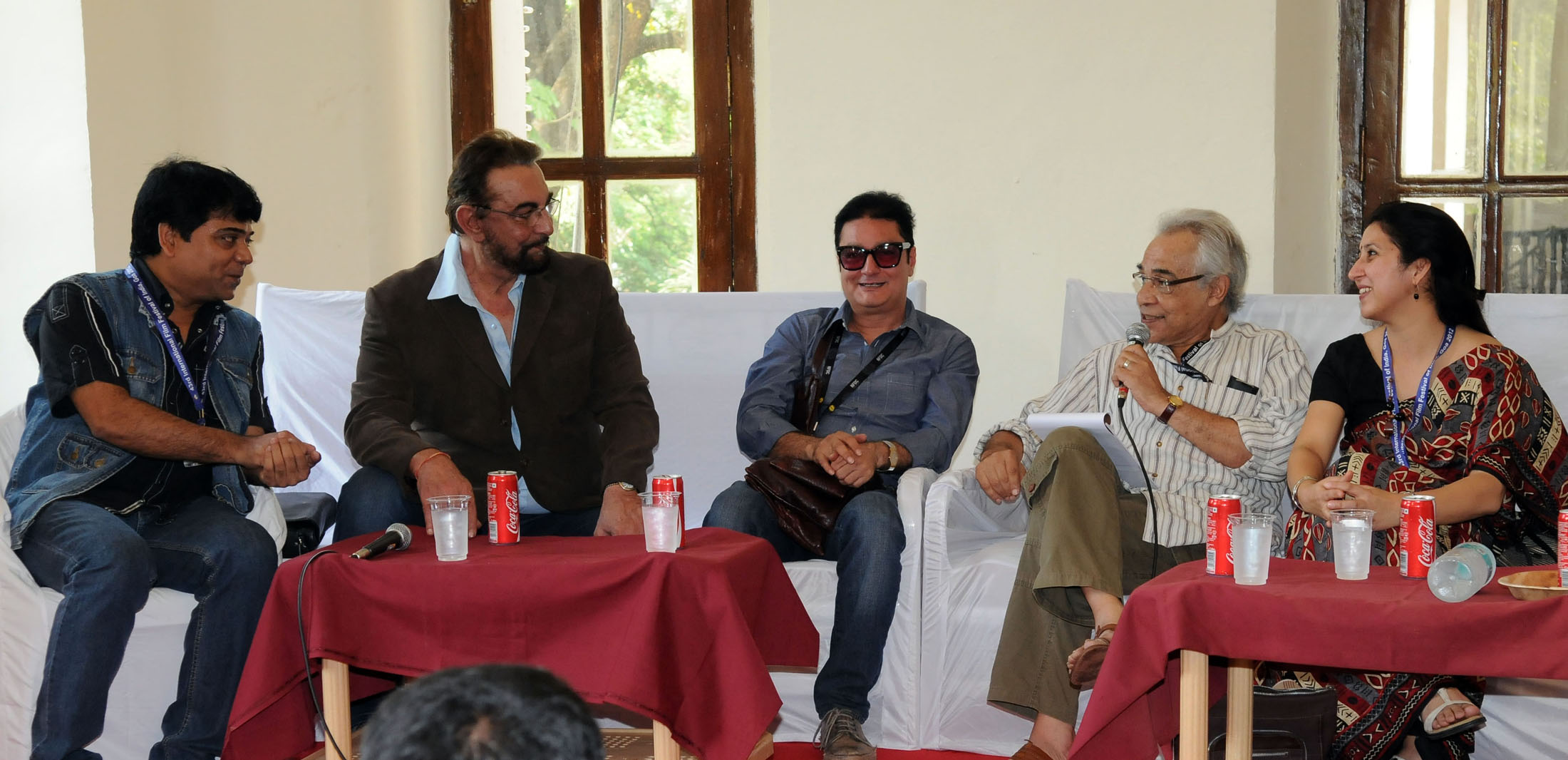
- Chatterjee at the IFFI, 2012
- Born: 30 May 1945 (age 81); Calcutta, Bengal Presidency, British India
- Education: Presidency University, Kolkata; Delhi School of Economics; Delhi University
- Occupations: Film, TV & Stage Actor, Ad & Short filmmaker, Literary Performer & Reciter

Dhritiman Chatterjee (born 30 May 1945) is an Indian actor. He began his acting career in 1970 as the protagonist of Satyajit Ray's Pratidwandi (The Adversary). Most of his acting work has been in India's "parallel", or independent, cinema with filmmakers such as Satyajit Ray, Mrinal Sen and Aparna Sen, among others and is noted for his acting skills. He has also worked in English films with well-known filmmakers such as Deepa Mehta and Jane Campion.

== Early life ==
Dhritiman is his screen name. He is otherwise known as Sundar Chatterjee and is quite active on the English stage in Chennai. Born on 30 May 1945, he was educated at Kolkata's St Xavier's Collegiate School and Presidency College, and the Delhi School of Economics. Chatterjee went on to pursue a parallel career in advertising, social communications and documentary filmmaking.

== Career ==
In 2019, Chatterjee lent his voice for narration in If Not for You, a documentary about Kolkata's long lasting love affair with legendary singer-songwriter Bob Dylan. About his acting qualities, Satyajit Ray once remarked, "I do not know what definition of a star these filmmakers have been using, but mine goes something like this. A star is a person on the screen who continues to be expressive and interesting even after he or she has stopped doing anything. This definition does not exclude the rare and lucky breed that gets lakhs of rupees per film; and it includes everyone who keeps his calm before the camera, projects a personality and evokes empathy. This is a rare breed too but one has met it in our films. Dhritiman Chatterjee of Pratidwandi is such a star." - (Our Films Their Films)

Dhritiman has not been closely associated with mainstream "Bollywood" and has appeared in a relatively small number of films. In later years, he worked with filmmakers including Jane Campion, as well as Indian directors Sanjay Leela Bhansali and Mani Ratnam. He has received acting awards in India and has served on the jury of the Indian National Film Awards.

He is currently the anchor of Pradhanmantri in Bengali on ABP Ananda from 14 December 2013.

== Filmography ==
=== Bengali ===
Year	Title	Role	Notes
1970	Pratidwandi	Siddhartha Chaudhuri	Siddharta and the City - a.k.a. The Adversary
1972	Picnic		
1973	Padatik	Political Activist	The Guerilla Fighter
1974	Jadu Bansha		
1980	Akaler Sandhane		Akaler Sandhaney - a.k.a. In Search of Famine
1981	36 Chowringhee Lane	Samaresh Moitra	
1989	Ganashatru	Nishrith Gupta	An Enemy of the People (UK)
1991	Agantuk	Prithwish Sen Gupta	The Stranger - a.k.a. The Visitor (International: English title) - a.k.a. Visiteur, Le (France)
1993	Sunya Theke Suru	Professor Bhishmadev Sharma	A Return to Zero (India: English title)
1997	Kahini		
2008	Chaturanga	Uncle	
2009	Joy Lies	Venkat	
2009	Hitlist		
2010	Ekti Tarar Khonje	Land Lord uncle	
2010	Gorosthaney Sabdhan	Mahadev Chowdhury	
2011	Noukadubi	Hemnalni's father	
2012	Maya Bazaar		
2013	Shunyo Awnko	Dr. Probal Roy	
2014	Ek Phaali Rodh	Dr. Somshankar Roy	
2015	Naxal	Shiddhartha Chowdhury	
2015	Agantuker Pore	Prithwish Sen Gupta	
2015	Shajarur Kanta	Byomkesh Bakshi	
2016	Double Feluda	Dr. Nihar Dutta	
2016	Chitrokar		
2018	Shobdo Kolpo Droom		
2019	Professor Shonku O El Dorado	Professor Shonku	
2025	Putulnacher Itikatha	Jadab	
2025	Dear Maa	Mentor	
2025	Chabiwala: The Keysmith	Owner of an advertising agency	

=== Hindi ===
Year	Title	Role	Notes
2005	Black	Paul McNally	
2007	Guru	Contractor Sahaab	
2009	13B	Mr.Kamdhar	
2009	Ek: The Power of One	DIG Sheirgill	
2012	Kahaani	Bhaskaran K, Director Intelligence Bureau	
2012	Agent Vinod	Sir Jagadishwar Metla	
2014	Kick	Raj Bhai	
2015	Wedding Pullav	Sid Kapoor	Uncredited
2016	Pink	Judge Satyajit Dutt	
2016	Chauranga	Pandit	
2016	Sanam Teri Kasam	Sanjay Pandit	
2017	Poorna: Courage Has No Limit	Alexandar	
2021	Chehre	Justice Jagdish Acharya	

=== English ===
Year	Title	Role	Notes
1999	Holy Smoke	Chidaatma Baba	Holy Smoke! (USA: video box title)
2000	Tales of The Kama Sutra: The Perfumed Garden	Sage Vaisyzyana	Tales of Kama Sutra (USA: video title)
2005	15 Park Avenue	Psychiatrist Dr. Kunal Barua	
2007	Framed	Inspector	Sapno Ke Desh Mein (Hindi title)
2013	Carnival	Master	
2015	The Man Who Knew Infinity	Narayana Iyer	
2019	If Not for You		Documentary; voice role

=== Malayalam ===
Year	Title	Role	Notes
2013	Neelakasham Pachakadal Chuvanna Bhoomi	Birmalda (Village head, Gouri's father)	
2018	Captain	Mr.Sinha	

=== Other language films ===
Year	Title	Role	Language
2009	Yavarum Nalam	Mr. Thyagarajan	Tamil
2016	Let Her Cry	Professor	Sinhala

=== Streaming television ===
Year	Title	Role	Language	Network	Notes
2020	Forbidden Love	Dr Harold Fernandez	Hindi	ZEE5	
2020	Feluda Pherot	Mahesh Chowdhury	Bengali	Addatimes	

== See also ==
- Barun Chanda
- Pradhanmantri (TV Series)
