= Selam Professor Shonku =

1995 short story collection by Satyajit Ray

- Selam Professor Shonku front cover
- Author: Satyajit Ray
- Illustrator: Satyajit Ray
- Language: Bengali
- Series: Professor Shonku
- Genre: Science fiction
- Publisher: Ananda Publishers
- Publication date: 1995
- Publication place: India

Selam Professor Shonku (Hats off, Professor Shonku) is a Professor Shonku series book written by Satyajit Ray and published by Ananda Publishers in 1995. Ray wrote these stories about Professor Shanku for Bengali magazines Sandesh and Anandamela. This book is a collection of seven Shonku stories.

== Stories ==
- Nefrudet er Samadhi (Sandesh, Autumn, 1986),
- Dr. Danieli'r Abishkar (Sandesh, Autumn 1988),
- Shonku o Frankenstein (Anandamela, Autumn 1988),
- Don Christobaldi'r Bhabishyadbani (Anandamela, Autumn 1989),
- Swarnaparnee (Anandamela, Autumn 1990),
- Intelectron (Anandamela, Autumn 1992),
- Dreksel Island er Ghatana (Anandamela, Autumn 1992)

== See also ==
- Shabash Professor Shonku
- Punashcha Professor Shonku
- Professor Shonkur Kandokarkhana
