= Koushik Kar =

Indian actor, theatre director (born 1984)

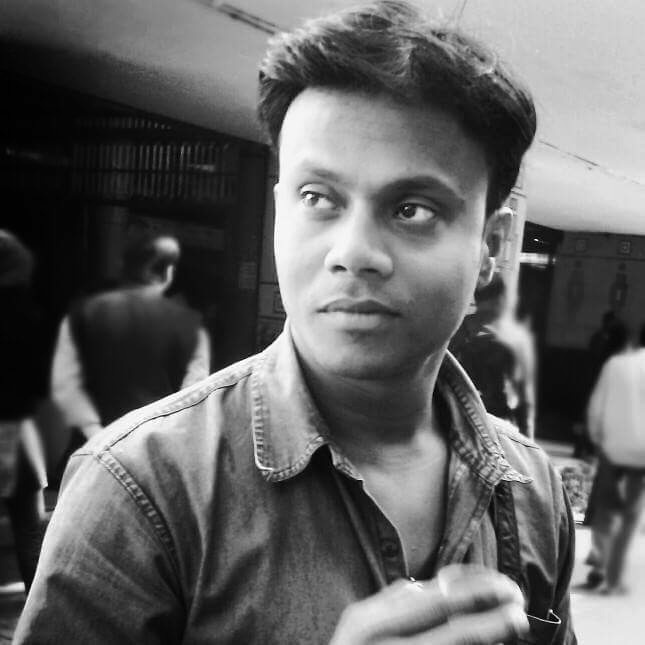
- Kar in March 2018
- Born: Koushik Kar; 1984 (age 41–42); Baharampur, West Bengal, India
- Education: Krishnath College; (B.A.); University of Kalyani; (M.A., B.Ed.)
- Occupations: Actor, Theatre and Film Director
- Years active: 2010–present
- Notable work: Chandragupta, Ras, Ma Ak Nirbhik Sainik, Natok Fatok, Boma, Hasuli Banker Upakatha, Indur o Manus, Auto

Koushik Kar (born 1984) is an Indian Bengali actor and theatre director. He started his professional acting in the year 2010 as a Minerva Repertory Theatre actor, in kolkata. His first performance was in the play Raja Lear (2010) in which the celebrated Bengali actor Soumitra Chatterjee was in the lead. His work Ma Ak Nirbhik Sainik (2013) as a director and actor was officially selected in 17th Bharat Rang Mahotsav, 2015. His direction and acting in various plays over the years rendered him as a well known theatre personality in contemporary Bengali theatre community and audiences.

He made his acting debut in the Bengali feature film Lorai: Play to Live (2012). Among other appearances his latest one was in the Bengali horror flick Shob Bhooturey (2017) directed by Birsa Dasgupta.

== Theatre ==
After starting his career as a Minerva repertory actor with the play Raja Lear in 2010, he subsequently acted in Devi Sarpamasta (2012) by Debesh Chattopadhyay, Chandragupta (2012) by Koushik Chattopadhya under Minerva Repertory. In Chandragupta he played the title role and his acting, dynamic agility, bodily presence was applauded. A sword fight scene in this play between Raja Nanda played by Anirban Bhattacharya and Chandragupta played by him was much talked and was also praised by famous writer Sunil Gangopadhyay in an article. His next notable work was Ras (2013) based on the novel of Narendranath Mitra by the same name directed by Sangita Pal. He got Sayak Samman - 2015 in the best actor category for his acting in this play. Some other important mention of him as an actor till now is -Boma (2015) directed by Bratya Basu, Indur o Manush (2016) by Debasis Biswas, Raja Oedipus (2016) by Rajesh Debnath etc.

In 2013 he got into direction with the play Ma Ak Nirbhik Sainik based on the novel of Sailen Ghosh by the same name under Howrah Jonaki production. In 2014 he founded his own theatre group Kolkata Rangeela and started to stage the play Ma Ak Nirbhik Sainik under his own Kolkata Rangeela production . The play got selected in the 17th Bharat Rang Mahotsav 2015 and also brought him Sundaram Samman 2015 in the best director category. Since then he directed three plays under his own Kolkata rangeela banner Natok Fatok (2015), Pornomochi (2015), Auto (2017), and one under Purbo Paschim production Hasuli Banker Upakatha (2015). His choice of challenging subject, dramatization style and refined dialogue writing in Natok Fatok based on the novel of Ken Kesey - One Flew Over the Cuckoo's Nest and in Hasuli Banker Upakatha based on the Tarasankar Bandyopadhyay novel by the same name immensely praised.

=== List of Plays ===
Year	Play	Director	Character	Production
2010	Raja Lear	Suman Mukhopadhyay	Gentleman	Minerva Repertory
2012	Devi Sarpamasta	Debesh Chattopadhyay	Udaas	Minerva Repertory
2012	Chandragupta	Koushik Chattopadhya	Chandragupta	Minerva Repertory
2013	Ma Ak Nirbhik Sainik	Own work	Moshen	Kolkata Rangeela†
2013	Ras	Sangita Pal	Motalef	Nirnoy
2014	HayBadan	Debesh Chattopadhyay	Kopil	Dinajpur Theatre Company
2015	Falsi Chorar Upakhyan	Aviggyan Bhattacharya	Haribagha	Rosikata
2015	Natok Fatok	Own work	No. 10	Kolkata Rangeela
2015	Boma	Bratya Basu	Hemchandra Kanungo	Bratyajon
2015	Hasuli Baker Upakatha	Own work	Karali	Purbo Paschim
2015	Parnomochi	Own work		Kolkata Opera
2016	Indur o Manush	Debasis Biswas	George	Howrah Bratyajon
2016	Raja Oedipus	Rajesh Debnath	Oedipus	Sabuj Sanskritic Kendra
2017	Auto	Own work	Chandan	Kolkata Rangeela

†	Denotes it was initially a Howrah Jonaki Production

== Filmography ==
In 2012 in his debut movie Lorai: Play to Live, directed by Parambrata Chatterjee he played one important role of Chipla Mahato and was appreciated in print media. Next he acted in two Bengali films under Zee Bangla Cinema Originals Kader Kuler Bou (2015) opposite Koneenica Banerjee and Barood(2015) as an antagonist. His other notable work was in Shob Bhooturey(2017) by Birsa Dasgupta.

In 2017 he took his first venture as a writer director in a Bengali film Pornomochi. A play by the same name was staged by him back in 2015. The film released in April, 2018.

=== List of Movies ===
Year	Film	Director	Character	Ref.
2012	Lorai: Play to Live	Parambrata Chatterjee	Chipla Mahato	
2015	Kader Kuler Bou	Soubhik Kundu	Rahmaan	
2015	Barood	Soumik Haldar		
2016	Ebong Kiriti	Anirban Paria	Ranjan Bose	
2016	Byomkesh Pawrbo	Arindam Sil	Dinesh Boral	
2017	Shob Bhooturey	Birsa Dasgupta	Robin babu	
2018	Parnomochi	Own work		
2018	Ek Je Chhilo Raja	Srijit Mukherji	Servant	
2019	Dwikhondito	Nabarun Sen	Ritwik	
2021	Chabiwala: The Keysmith	Raja Ghosh	Bhaben, a key-maker	

== TV and web series ==
- Mahanayak (TV series), 2016.
- Swtyaneshi Pather Kanta – Byomkesh Web Series (Season 1 episode 1 as Prafulla Ray) in Hoichoi Originals.
- Fotash 2024 (Fridaay OTT app)

== Awards ==
- Sayak Samman 2015 in the category of Best Actor for the play Ras (2013).
- Sundaram Samman 2015.

== External Reference ==
- koushik kar on X
- Koushik Kar at IMDb
