= Pracheta Gupta =

Indian writer and Journalist

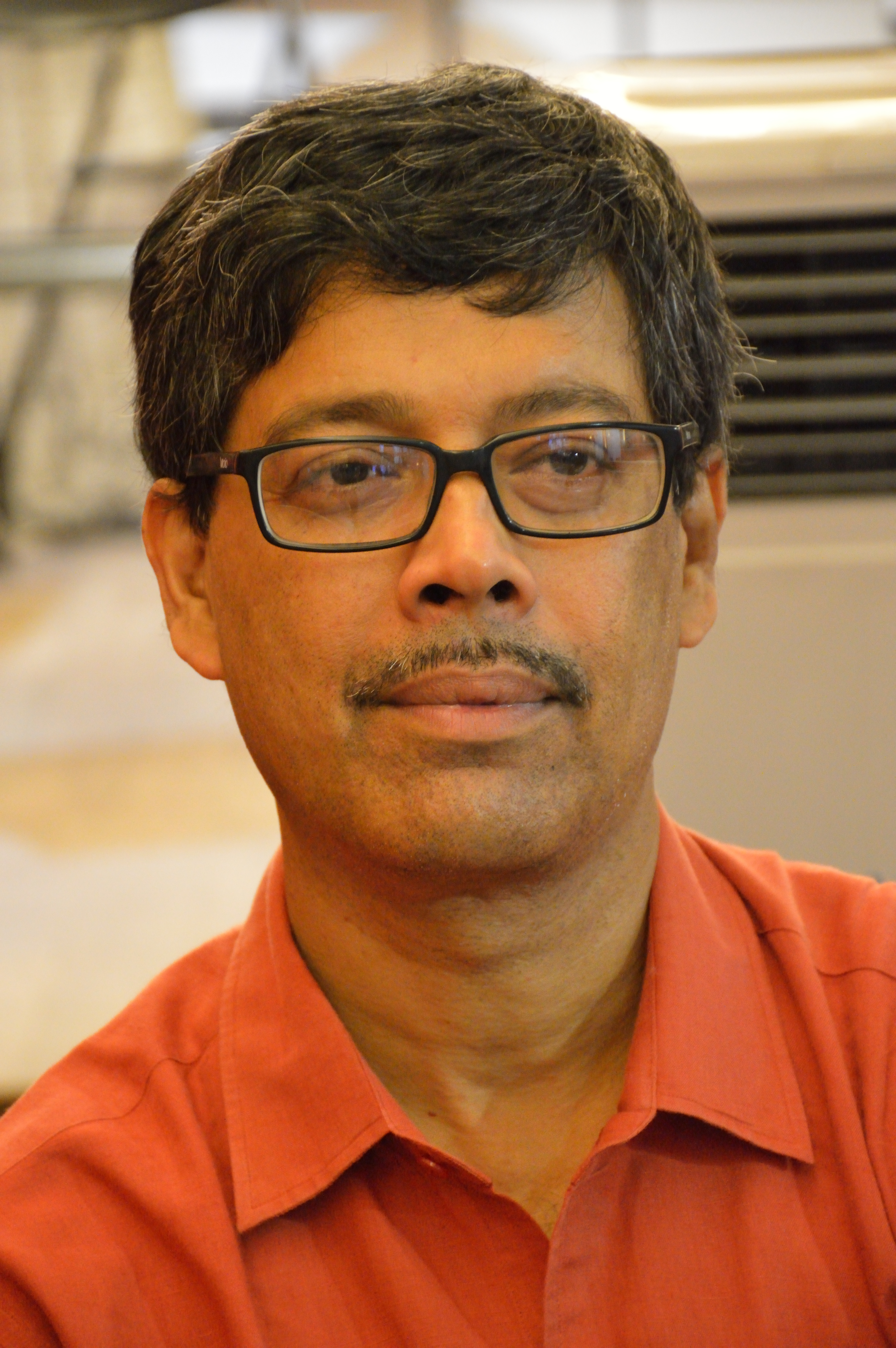
- Born: 14 October 1962 (age 63); Bangur Avenue, Kolkata
- Education: University of Calcutta
- Occupations: Writer, Journalist
- Spouse: Mitra Gupta
- Children: Samudra Gupta
- Parent(s): Kshetra Gupta (Father), Writer Jyostna Gupta (Mother)
- Writing career
- Notable awards: Sera Bangali Award (ABP Ananda, 2022)

Pracheta Gupta (Note: Spelling according to Telegraph, Calcutta) (alternative spelling Procheto Gupta or Prachet Gupta or Procheta Gupta; Bengali: প্রচেত গুপ্ত) (born 14 October 1962) is a Bengali writer and journalist. In 2007, his work Chander Bari was adapted into a film by director Tarun Majumdar. In 2011, director Sekhar Das made a film about Gupta named Necklace. A few of his stories have been translated into Hindi, Oriya and Marathi.

In December 2022, Gupta received the Sera Bangali Award from ABP Ananda.

== Early life ==
Recipient of Kishore Sahitya Academy Award, 2021, Gupta spent his childhood in Bangur Avenue and studied in Bangur Boys school. He started writing from his childhood. His first story was published in Anandamela when he was only 12 years old. Later his literary works were published in many more magazines. He completed his graduation from Scottish Church College, Kolkata with Economics Honours under the University of Calcutta.

== Literary Career ==
Gupta's first novel Aamar ja achhe was published in 2004 in Anandalok magazine. His first children's novel Laal rong-er churi was published in the same year in Anandamela.

== Notable works ==
- Chand Pore Ache
- Dhulobalir Jibon
- Aamar Ja Aachhe
- Gopen open
- Kothao Noy
- Deri Hoye Geche
- Jhildangar Kanya
- TEEN NUMBER CHITHI
- Doshi Dhora Porbei
- Se Irabati
- EI GOLPO TA BOLA THIK HOLONA
- Nishad
- Sonaiganjer Upakhyan

Thriller:

- Meghomallare Hotyar Gaan
- Ratey Porben Na
- Agunbarhir Katha

Romantic franchise:

- Ek Je Chilo Sagar
- Amii Sagar
- SAGARER SAB ACHHE

== Films based on his works ==
- Chander Bari (2007)
- Necklace (2011)
- Balukabela.com (2012)
- Akash Choan (2016)
- Bhalobashar Bari (2018)

== Awards ==
- 2021, Kishore Sahitya Academy Award.
- 2022, Sera Bangali Award from ABP Ananda.
