= List of Professor Shonku adventures =

The list of Professor Shonku adventures include 40 stories of Shonku adventures written by Satyajit Ray. The first Shonku story Byomjatrir Diary (An Astronaut's Diary) was published in the Sandesh in 1961. It was a long story describing Shonku's space travel.Since then,Shonku has gone through various experiences and has discovered and invented many scientific things.The last Shonku adventure story Drexel Islander Ghatana (The Incident of Drexel Island) remained unfinished due to the death of Satyajit Ray.

Story	English title	First date of publication	Subject/Topic dealt with	Plot outline	Location of incidence	Characters						
Story	English title	First date of publication	Subject/Topic dealt with	Plot outline	Location of incidence	Abinash Majumdar	Nakur Chandra Biswas	Newton (cat)	Prahlad	Jeremy Saunders	Wilhelm Crole	John Summerville
Byomjatrir Diary	Astronaut's Diary	Sandesh at September, October, November, December in 1961.	Space Travel	Shonku makes a rocket and goes to Mars. He takes Prahlad, Newton and Bidhushekhar (a robot) with him. In Mars they encounter some terrible creatures. Finally the rocket of Shonku reaches a planet named "Tafa" where low civilized and non-intelligent beings live who were claimed to be intelligent and highly civilized by his robot Bidhushekhar.	Space	Yes	No	Yes	Yes	No	No	No
Professor Shonku o Egypshio Atonko	Professor Shonku and the Egyptian Terror	Sandesh at April-May in 1963.	Egyptian Mummy	British archaeologist James Summerton finds more than 30 Mummies in the Egyptian city Bubastis. Professor Shonku goes to Egypt and joins Summerton's team. At the same time, an Egyptian person threatens Shonku and asks to stop the excavation. Shonku ignores the warning. Summerton gifts Shonku one of the Mummies he found in the excavation. Professor Shonku brings that to Giridih, India. The Egyptian person who warned Professor Shonku chases him to Giridih and claims himself as a descendant of the mummified person.	Port Said, Bubastis, Egypt; Giridih, India	No	No	Yes	Yes	No	No	No
Professor Shonku o Har	Professor Shonku and the Bones		a) Tyrannosaurus (skeleton) b) Magical powers of Indian yogi	Professor Shonku finds a Tyrannosaurus skeleton near Nilgiri mountains. He comes back to Giridih and starts researching. At the same time a sadhu comes there who can transform bones of dead animals into living beings using magical powers.	Nilgiri mountains, Giridih	Yes	No	No	No	No	No	No
Professor Shonku o Macaw	Professor Shonku and the Macaw		a) Theory to become invisible b) Macaw bird	Professor Shonku invents an oral drug, using which can make a man invisible. Gajanan Tarafdar, a rival scientist, tries to steal the formula. At the same time a talking Macaw comes to Professor Shonku's garden. Professor Shonku gives the bird shelter in his own house. After few days Professor Shonku's formula gets stolen and at the same time the bird goes missing as well.	Giridih	Yes	No	Yes	No	No	No	No
Professor Shonku o Aschorjo Putul	Professor Shonku and the Curious Statuettes		Suspicious humanoid sculpture	Professor Shonku goes to Sweden to receive honorary doctorate degree from Swedish Academy of Sciences. There he meets a man named Gregor Lindquist. Gregor informs him that he is a doll maker and invites him to see his creations. Professor Shonku accepts the invitation, but, he finds out some very surprising and unpleasant truth. In addition, he falls in danger.	Sweden	No	No	No	No	No	No	No
Professor Shonku o Golok Rahasya	Professor Shonku and the Mysterious Sphere		Smallest planet of solar system, Extraterrestrial life	Abinash Majumdar finds a ball (spherical object) near Usri river. Very soon he notices the ball's peculiar characteristics like the colour of the ball changes in every few hours, sometimes it gets wet and other times it becomes as cold as snow. Abinash Majumdar reports it to Professor Shonku. After few days, Abinash Majumdar gives the ball to Professor Shonku. Professor Shonku discovers that the ball ("spherical object") is actually a small planet.	Giridih	Yes	No	Yes	No	No	No	No
Professor Shonku o Chi Ching	Professor Shonku and Chee-Ching		Hypnotism	A Chinese magician named Chi Ching comes to meet Professor Shonku in Giridih. Professor Shonku firstly fails to recognise him, but then realises that he attended Chi Ching's magic show in Kobe, Japan. On that day, after showing some common magical tricks, Chi Ching started demonstrating hypnotism. Professor Shonku specially disliked the way magician Chi Ching was making some common people feel embarrassed after calling them on the stage. Finally Chi Ching called Professor Shonku to come up on the stage, being unaware that Professor Shonku was a great scientist and an expert of hypnotism. For next 30 minutes he tried to hypnotize Shonku in every possible way, but fails. Professor Shonku remembers Chi Ching. Chi Ching goes to Shonku's laboratory, checks Shonku's works and inventions and remarks "wongerful" "wongerful" (i.e. "wonderful", "wonderful"). Chi Ching tells Shonku "You ale gleat" (i.e. "You are great"), but, right after that, he adds "but, I am gleater" (i.e. "but, I am greater"). Professor Shonku fails to understand the meaning of this comment. Chi Ching departs. But, right after that some unbelievable things start happening in Shonku's house. A common house lizard turns into a Chinese Dragon and smashes his laboratory.	Kobe, Giridih	No	No	Yes	Yes	No	No	No
Professor Shonku o Khoka	Professor Shonku and the Little Boy		Hidden power/abilities of human brain	A child who otherwise used to be normal, has "changed" after he fell and hurt his head. Once happy and normal, this child has become melancholic and speaks things which the parents do not follow and term as gibberish. The parents desperately seek help to get their boy back. A doctor finally suggests to see Shonku. Although initially Shonku was reluctant to see this boy as practising medicines is not his profession, after he sees the boy it soon becomes obvious that this is indeed an extraordinary case worthy of his attention. What appeared gibberish to his parents were actually meaningful facts which should normally be well beyond his or many other people's reach, spoken in many different languages which the child had no way to learn. He also demonstrates psychic ability, where the flash of a camera stops working after he declares he doesn't want to be pictured but the reporter insists. Although the child seems to be omniscient, he appears sad and detached from the material world. The story ends when the child concocts a potion by mixing several very dangerous chemicals and acids, some of which were Shonku's own inventions, and gulps it down before Shonku had a chance to stop him. A short period of unconsciousness follows, after which the child wakes up as his normal old self. He then makes friends with Shonku, states he has no memory of things which happened in the last few days, and even asks for chocolates.	Giridih	Yes	No	No	Yes	No	No	No
Professor Shonku o Bhoot	Professor Shonku and the Spook		Ghost, Human soul	Professor Shonku invents a device named Neo-Spectroscope that can contact souls of deceased people and starts researching with it. At the same time some people, including Abinash Majumdar, starts reporting Professor Shonku that they have seen him in some places of Giridih and when they called him, he paid no attention. Now, Professor Shonku clearly knows that he was not the person. At the end of the story, Batukeshwar Shonku, grandfather of great grandfather (oti briddho propitamoho) of Shonku appears.	Giridih	Yes	No	Yes	Yes	No	No	No
Professor Shonku o Robu	Professor Shonku and Robu		Robot; Artificial intelligence	In Giridih, Professor Shonku makes a robot and names it Robu. One unique feature of Robu is he can solve difficult mathematical problems. Professor Paumer from Germany sends a letter to Professor Shonku, desires to see his work (i.e. the robot) and invites him to Germany. Professor Shonku accepts the invitation and reaches Heidelberg, Germany. In Heidelberg, Robu amazes Professor Paumer by its intelligence and capability of solving mathematical equations. Professor Paumer tells Professor Shonku about Professor Borgelt who also has been researching on Robotics. Professor Borgelt meets Professor Shonku, checks Robu's intelligence and invites Professor Shonku to his palace. On the next evening, when Professor Shonku goes to Professor Borgelt's palace attending his invitation, Professor Borgelt gives him offer to buy his robot. When Professor Shonku rejects his offer, Professor Borgelt attempts to kill him. Robu miraculously saves Professor Shonku and Professor Shonku find a very surprising fact about Professor Borgelt's robotics research.	Giridih, India; Heidelberg, Germany	Yes	No	Yes	No	No	No	No
Professor Shonku o Roktomatshya Rahasya	Professor Shonku and the Mystery of the Bloody Fish		Underwater Mystery	Professor Shonku invents a device named Linguagraph that can translate any earth language to any other, including animal languages (sounds). At the same time Professor Shonku notices a report in a local newspaper that in Gopalpur, Odisha when a group of fishermen pulled their net in from the seat about twenty five bright red fishes jumped out from the net and hopped back to the sea. After two days, Professor Shonku finds another article published in The Statesman which reports a Norwegian youth, while taking bath in the sea, was attacked by some unknown red fish. The Norwegian youth died. Professor Shonku decides to go to Gopalpur to investigate the issue. Abinash Majumdar goes with him. In Gopalpur they meet Hamakura and Tanaka, two Japanese marine zoologists. Professor Shonku learns they have also come to Gopalpur to study those peculiar red fishes. They also informs Professor Shonku that they have a submarine with them and they are going to spend some time underwater and attempt to find those red fishes. Professor Shonku requests Hamakura to take them in journey. Hamakura happily agrees. Hamakura, Tanaka and Professor Shonku, Abinash Majumdar and Newton goes underwater to find those mysterious red fishes.	Giridih, Gopalpur, Odisha; Underwater	Yes	No	Yes	No	No	No	No
Professor Shonku o Cochabamba-r Guha	Professor Shonku and the Cochabamba's Cave		Primitive man	Professor Shonku receives a letter from Professor Hugo Dumbarton informing him a recent earthquake in Cochabamba, Bolivia which broke a mountain in two and thus created a passage between two halves. No one, in human history, has gone behind that mountains. A local village boy was playing hide and seek, and when he went to the mountain caves he saw some colourful paintings in the walls of the cave. On Professor Dumbarton's invitation, Professor Shonku goes to Cochabamba. There they discover many extinct animal species, an unknown animal and a primitive human being, alive!	Cochabamba, Bolivia	No	No	No	No	No	No	No
Professor Shonku o Gorilla	Professor Shonku and the Gorilla		Gorilla	British zoologist James Massingham goes to Congo to research on gorilla and after few days goes missing. Another British zoologist Julian Gregory sends Shonku a telegram and says that he thinks that Massingham is alive but is in trouble. He also tells Shonku that they are going to the forests of Congo in search of Massingham and asks Shonku to join them. Professor Shonku decides to go to Congo. Abinash Majumdar tells Shonku that he wants to go with him. Professor Shonku approves his request and takes Majumdar with him. They reach Kalehe Territory of Congo and sets out in the jungle in search of Massingham. There they encounter gorillas. Shonku notices those gorillas are behaving abnormally, like machine. Gregory and Shonku get kidnapped. Abinash Babu attempts to save Shonku and Gregory.	Congo	Yes	No	No	No	No	No	No
Professor Shonku o Baghdader Baksho	Professor Shonku and the Box from Baghdad		An extraordinary invention of ancient Iraq	Professor Shonku goes to Baghdad, Iraq to attend an international inventors' conference. There he meets Professor Goldstein and Professor Petruci and they discuses on the glory of ancient Sumerian civilisation. They all praise the inventions made in Sumerian civilization. They meet an Iraqi man named Hasan Al-Hubbal. Al-Hubbal shows them an old box and tells them the box contains something very extraordinary. Shonku and other two professors find out that the box contains a gadget/equipment which is very difficult to imagine even in their time, but that was made in ancient Iraq. Goldstein becomes greedy and tries to steal it.	Baghdad	No	No	No	No	No	No	No
Swapnadwip	Dream Island	Sandesh, May and June 1971	Mysterious island	Professor Shonku is haunted by a repeating dream where he along, with his friends, are stranded on a beautiful exotic island without any inhabitants. His friends also experience the same dream. It is as if the mysterious island is beckoning great scientists of the world to it. Professor Shonku decides to go to the island. Abinash Majumdar also goes with him. There they found unknown plants and Professor Shonku falls in danger. Finally a rescue team saves them and the other scientists. In this story Abinash Babu writes in Professor Shonku's diary for the first and the only time.	16°N 136°E	Yes	No	Yes	No	No	No	No
Aschorjo Prani		Sandesh, Autumn 1971	Miniature Evolution	In a laboratory of St. Gallen, Switzerland, bio-scientist Cornelius Humboldt and Professor Shonku create a miniaturized evolution and there in a flask they create artificial life. In the flask, the stages of evolution pass very quickly and within few days the unicellular animal becomes a miniaturized human being. When Professor Humboldt sees that the mini man in the flask looks like Proefessor Shonku, he tries to kill "original" Shonku.	St. Gallen, Switzerland	No	No	No	No	No	No	Yes
Moru Rahasya		Sandesh, May and June 1972	Missing Scientist	A scientist whom Shonku knew, Demetrius, goes missing all of a sudden. Shonku is informed by his friend John Summerville, and the two set out to find Demetrius. Events and trails lead Shonku and Somerville to the Sahara desert, where they discover an anstonishing truth about Demetrius and his newest invention, which he had tested on himself before his disappearance.	Greece, Sahara desert	No	No	No	No	No	No	Yes
Corvus	Corvus	Anandamela, Autumn 1972	Bird's I.Q.	Shonku experiments on a crow, artificially enhancing its I.Q. many-fold. Shonku displays his crow, 'Corvus' to world's leading ornithologists who had come to attend a conference in Santiago. They are all thrilled by Corvus' intelligence. Later, a magician named Argus offers to buy Corvus from Shonku, but the professor politely refuses. What will Argus do now?	Santiago	No	No	Yes	Yes	No	No	No
Shonku o Frankenstein	Shonku and Frankenstein	Anandamela, Autumn 1988	Revival from death	Shonku along with Saunders and Chroll visits the Frankenstein Castle in the German city of Ingolstadt.There he meets Julius Frankenstein the great grandson of Victor Frankenstein who was mentioned in the novel written by Mary Shelley. Shonku learns the forbidden formula of reviving dead people.They also came to know about the threat of Hans Redel, a Nazi follower who preached Hitler's ideas after his death and presently tortures all the Jews in Ingolstadt including Julius. Later, Shonku is able to revive doctor Tomas Gillet. This news being internationalised Redel's followers give a threat to Shonku, Julius and others to revive their leader Redel who had died due to Thombosisis.The story revolves on the plan how Shonku revived Redel and also saved Germany of the Nazi ideals.	Ingolstadt	No	No	Yes	Yes	Yes	Yes	No
Nakurbabu O El Dorado	Nakur Babu and El Dorado	Anandamela, Autmnn 1980	Mythological city of El dorado	This is an adventure story of the fictional genius scientist and inventor Professor Shanku visiting the heart of the Amazon forests in search of the mythical city of El Dorado. One day, a typical Bengali gentleman Nakur Chandra Biswas alias Nakur Babu comes to meet him in Shanku's house in Giridih. He lives in Makardaha. Shanku realises that Nakur Babu has supernatural power having the ability to read other's minds and see the future. Nakur Babu warns him about the upcoming incidents of São Paulo. Seeing his extrasensory power, an amazed Shanku goes to Brazil with Nakur Babu to join a science conference and the mystery begins ending in the fabled city of El Dorado deep inside the Brazilian Amazon.		No	Yes	Yes	Yes	Yes	Yes	
Dr. Sering er Smaramsakti	Dr Schering’s Memory	Anandamela, Autumn 1974										
Shonku'r Shanir Dasha	Shonku's Saturn Affliction	Anandamela, Autumn 1976	Humanoid robot									
Shonku'r Subarna Sujog	Shonku’s Golden Opportunity	Sandesh, April, May and June 1977	Making gold through Alchemy									
Hypnogen	Hypnogen	Sandesh, April, May and June 1976	Hypnotic Gaseous Agent		Norway	No	No	No	No	No	No	Yes
Nefrudet er Samadhi	Nefrudet’s Tomb	Sandesh, Autumn, 1986										
Dr. Danieli'r Abishkar	Dr. Danielle’s Discovery	Sandesh, Autumn 1988	Multiple personality Drug									
Don Christobaldi'r Bhabishyadbani	Prophecies by Don Christobaldi	Anandamela, Autumn 1989										
Swarnaparnee	The Tree with Golden Leaves	Anandamela, Autumn 1990										
Intellectron (Incompleted)	Intellectron	Anandamela, Autumn 1993	Quantity of Intelligence Measuring Device	Shonku develops the "Intellectron," a machine to measure human intelligence, and tests it on himself and his neighbour Abinashbabu, revealing varying intelligence levels.He plans to showcase it at a conference in Hamburg, anticipating skepticism. Nakurbabu,unexpectedly arrives, accurately predicting the Shonku's travel plans and insisting on accompanying him, warning of impending danger. Nakurbabu tests the machine, scoring moderately, and reiterates his request and foreshadowing potential trouble related to Shonku.	Giridih	Yes	Yes	No	No	No	No	No
Drexel Islander Ghatana (Incompleted)	The Incident of Drexel Island	Anandamela, Autumn 1993				Yes	No	No	Yes	No	No	No
Mahakasher Doot	A Messenger from Space	Anandamela, Autumn 1979										
Shonku'r Congo Abhijan	Shonku’s Expedition to the Congo	Anandamela, Autumn 1981										
Professor Shonku o UFO	Shonku and the UFO	Anandamela, Autumn, 1982										
Ashcharjantu												
Shonku o Adim Manush	Shonku and the Primordial Man											
Shonkur Porolokchorcha												
Professor Rondir Time Machine	Professor Rondi’s Time Machine		Time Machine	Shonku Develops a Time Machine, but at the same time Professor Luigi Rondi and German Scientist Kleiber develops it too. However, Kleiber dies mysteriously and Rondi calls Shonku to see his Time Machine, which he intends to use for commercial purposes. Shonku's investigation leads him to find that Rondi had Kleiber killed and used his progression to the time Machine theory for his own development.	Milan							
Monro Dweeper Rahasya	The Mystery of Monroe Island	Anandamela, Autumn 1977	Man-eating Monster									
Compu	Tellus	Anandamela, Autumn 1978	Artificial Intelligence									
Ek Shringo Abhijan	One-Horned Expedition	Sandesh,November,December 1973 & January,February,March,April 1974	Unicorn & Flying Lama									

== See also ==
- Bengali science fiction
- Feluda
