= The Telegraph in Schools =

Newspaper in India

The Telegraph In Schools(TTIS)
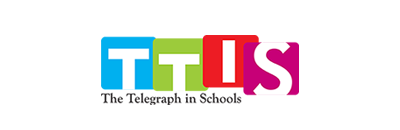
- Type: Weekly newspaper
- Format: Broadsheet
- Owner: ABP Group
- Editor: Rudrangshu Mukherjee
- Political alignment: Independent
- Language: English
- Price: Rs.5.00 (India)

The Telegraph in Schools (TTIS) is the largest student-run newspaper in East-India. TTIS was launched in 1999 and re-launched in July 2000. It is run by The Telegraph and Anandabazar Group or ABP group. TTIS organizes the Great TTIS Challenge every year, with the motto "Skill, talent, competition, enjoyment and loads of fun". TTIS Challenge is held at Swabhumi and it is the biggest inter-school event of eastern India, with participation of over 100 prestigious schools in Kolkata. Moreover, it also gives a chance to young and budding kids good at writing and journalism to become a journalist.

== Columns ==
Recurring sections of the newspaper include:

- "Open Forum": a column of independent articles on various issues
- "Book Shelf": book reviews
- "Speak out": where readers can convey their request and messages to the editor
- "News Headlines": events in the news of the last week
- "Four Columns": various informative articles are published in this column
- "School news": events organised in different schools
- "Fun Zone": activities for children
- "Centre Spread": poster of eminent personalities and important events
- "Big Question": a column to debate
- "Tell Tale": poems and drawings submitted by students
- "Cinescope": movie reviews and song lyrics
- "Cover story": the main story of the issue
- "Tiger Shots": shots submitted by the budding photographers of the country
- "Face 2 Face": featuring interviews

== Events ==
=== Saraswati Fiesta ===
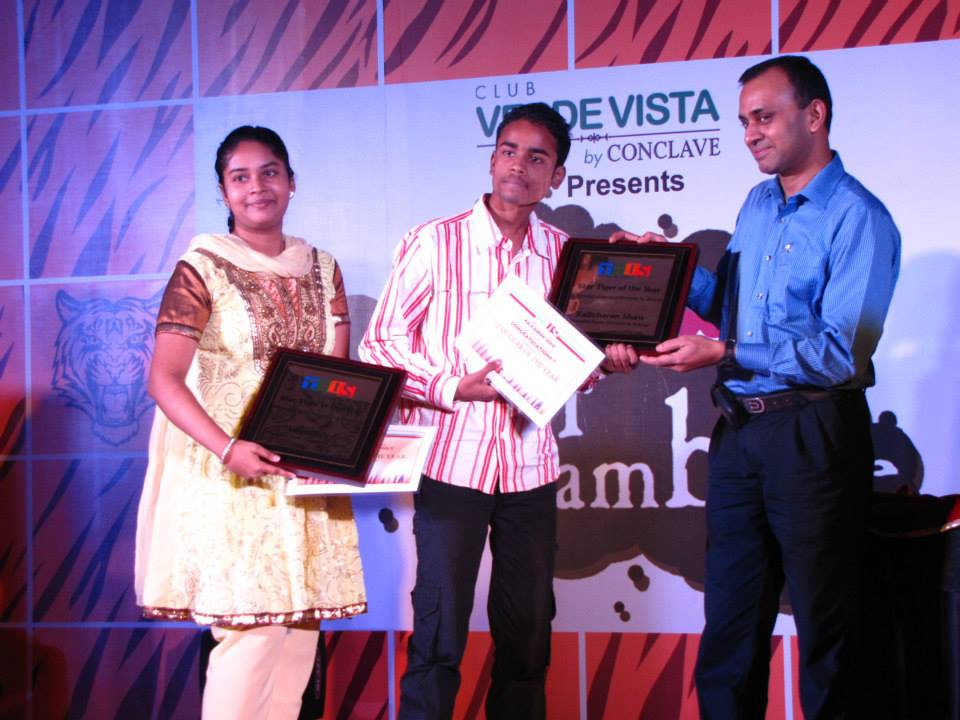
"Star Tiger Reporters" Ishita Roy and Kalicharan Shaw being awarded at the TTIS Jamboree 2013 at Club Verde Vista

This is a grand celebration of Saraswati Puja through fun and games at different housing complexes and schools.

=== Choto Chokhe Boro Pujo ===
TTIS Readers go pandal hopping with celebrities and judge the different Durga Puja Pandals.

=== The Great TTIS Challenge ===
This is the largest fest-cum-carnival in Eastern India, where more than hundred schools compete against each other to become the Champion Of Champions.

In 2013, Ralph Mao was awarded as the Champions of the champions students, and Kalicharan Shaw received the Star Tiger of the year memento.

=== Jamboree ===
TTIS Jamboree is the annual award function where outstanding reporters are honoured. In 2013, Ishita Roy and Kalicharan Shaw were declared as the joint winners of the "Star Tiger Reporter of the Year" Award, the highest honour for a TTIS reporter. Ishita Roy has translated Chander Pahar in English for The Telegraph In Schools.

=== The Big Question ===
TTIS gives a chance to their readers to debate on a question. After some weeks the debate was printed in the paper.
