= ABP Ganga =

Indian News channel (Hindi)

- Country: India
- Network: ABP Group
- Headquarters: Uttar Pradesh, India

Programming
- Language: Hindi

Ownership
- Owner: ABP Group
- Sister channels: ABP Ananda; ABP Asmita; ABP Majha; ABP Sanjha; ABP News; ABP Live; ABP Nadu

History
- Launched: 15 April 2019; 6 years ago

Links
- Website: www.abpganga.com

Availability

Streaming media
- Live Streaming: Watch Live

ABP Ganga is a 24-hour Indian regional Hindi-language news channel for Uttar Pradesh and Uttarakhand. It is owned by ABP Group. The channel was launched on 15 April 2019.

In June 2023, it was reported that ABP had decided to transit ABP Ganga from linear to digital-led format delivery of their content.

== See also ==
- ABP Group
- ABP News
- List of Indian television stations
- 24-hour television news channels
