= Dwikhondito =

Bengali film

Dwikhandito
- Dwikhondito film poster
- Directed by: Nabarun Sen
- Distributed by: Dev Entertainment Ventures
- Release date: 29 March 2019 (Kolkata)
- Country: India
- Language: Bengali

Dwikhondito is a 2019 Indian Bengali film directed by Nabarun Sen. This was Sen's directorial debut film. The film tells a story of a writer suffering from Dissociative identity disorder. Saayoni Ghosh played the role of a psychiatrist.

== Cast ==
- Saswata Chatterjee
- Soumitra Chatterjee
- Koushik Kar
- Saayoni Ghosh
- Anjana Basu
- Partha D Mitra
- Tanima Das Sarkar
