= Dwijen Bandyopadhyay =

Bengali actor, theater personality and professor (1949-2017)

Dwijen Bandyopadhyay (22 September 1949 – 27 September 2017) was a veteran Bengali actor and theater personality from West Bengal, India. He worked onstage from the 1970s. Bandyopadhyay has also been a professor in the department of Drama at Rabindra Bharati University from 1996 to 2014.

== Career ==
Dwijen Bandyopadhyay had a degree in Chartered Accountancy and had been the Chief Accountant at Amrita Bazar Patrika for many years until the company closed down. He joined as a professor in the department of Drama at Rabindra Bharati University, Kolkata right after he came to the limelight through a popular Bengali comedy-cum-thriller series Abar Jakher Dhan. Later during the early 2000s he found ground in the acting industry through the TV serials Chuni Panna and Labonyer Sansar. He acted in various movies and T.V. serials. Bandyopadhyay played in both intellectual and mainstream films along with continuing his work in the culture of Group theatre of Kolkata. He performed in dramas like; Amitakshar, Ghora, Samabartan, Balidan, Abhimukh, Dashchakra, Mallabhumi, and Mushthijog, Gunadharer Asukh, Spardhabarna, Monoshchokhyu, Ainshiddho and Bhootnath. Bandyopadhyay constituted his own theatre group Samstab in 1982. His last stage performance was on 1st January, 2016 of the play Bhootnath at Girish Manch after which he succumbed to a major nerve problem and several minor cerebral strokes.

== Partial filmography ==
- Shudhu Tumi (2004)
- Chander Bari (2007)
- Ami Yasin ar Madhubala (2007)
- Gorosthaney Sabdhan (film) (2010)
- Prem By Chance (2010)
- Autograph (2010)
- Katakuti (2011)
- Gosainbaganer Bhoot (2011)
- Jekhane Bhooter Bhoy (2012)
- Hawa Bodol (2013)
- Phoring (2013)
- Ashchorjyo Prodeep (2013)
- Badshahi Angti (2014)
- Jaatishwar (2014)
- Ichchhemotir Gappo (2015)
- Shajarur Kanta (2015)
- Beche Thakar Gaan (2016)
- Neemphul (2020)

== Award ==
In 1992 he received Paschim Banga Natya Akademi award for his acting in the drama named Balidan.

== Death ==
Dwijen Bandyopadhyay had been suffering from a major nerve problem for a year and nine months. It affected his speech and the right part of the body causing him to be unable to walk normally. Because of this, he couldn't work onstage or onscreen leading him to suffer from immense depression. On 27 September 2017, Bandyopadhyay died of a massive heart attack at his residence at 2:00am in Kolkata at 68.
