= Kahini =

1997 Bengali film

Kahini (transl. The Story) is a Bengali drama film directed by Malay Bhattacharya and produced by Chandramala Bhattacharya. It was officially released in India on 17 October 1997 under the banner of Movie Mill. It was honored with Best Debut Film of a Director at the 43rd National Film Awards.

== Plot ==
Rajat, a painter and taxi driver, decides to kidnap a child. Before executing the plan a stranger gives him some documents and a half-burnt photo of a child. Rajat starts his journey with the kidnapped child but gets more and more entangled in complex situations. The physical condition of the child becomes worse.

== Cast ==
- Dhritiman Chatterjee as Rajat
- Rabi Ghosh
- Debesh Roy Chowdhury as Taxi driver
- Debashish Goswami
- Neelkantha Sengupta
- Anuradha Ghatak
- Ajoy Acharya
- Sukhlal Baidya
- Soumyamoy Bakshi
- Soumik Bal
- Jayantamohan Bandyopadhyay
- Bishwanath Banerjee
- Indranil Banerjee
