= Ashok Kumar Sarkar =

Indian journalist

- Born: 7 October 1912; Calcutta, British India
- Died: 17 February 1983 (aged 70); Calcutta, West Bengal, India
- Education: Scottish Church College, Calcutta
- Occupation: Journalist
- Years active: 1958–1983
- Organization: Ananda Bazar Patrika
- Spouse: Aloka Sarkar
- Children: Aveek Sarkar; Arup Kumar Sarkar; Adhip Kumar Sarkar; Asani Sarkar; Sarbani Rath
- Parents: Prafulla Kumar Sarkar (father); Nirjharini Sarkar (mother)

Asoke Kumar Sarkar (7 October 1912 – 17 February 1983) was an Indian journalist and the Editor-in-Chief of the Ananda Bazar Patrika from 1958 until his death. He also served as the chief editor of various periodicals published by the Ananda Bazar Group of Publications. A prominent figure in Bengali publishing and culture, he was awarded the Padma Bhushan by the Government of India in 1967 for his distinguished contributions to journalism.

== Early life and education ==
Sarkar's ancestry traces back to Kumarkhali in the Kushtia subdivision of Nadia district, a place associated with the publication of the famous daily Gram Barta Prakashika. He was born on 7 October 1912. His father, Prafulla Kumar Sarkar, was the founding editor of the daily Ananda Bazar Patrika from 1922 until his death in 1944. His mother, Nirjharini Sarkar, was a patriot and literary figure who corresponded with Rabindranath Tagore; their letters were later published by Visva-Bharati University. He had two sisters, Kalyani and Shibani. His grandmother, Saralabala Sarkar, was a renowned poet, author, social worker, and an associate of Sister Nivedita. He was also related to Matilal Ghosh and Sisir Kumar Ghosh of the Amrita Bazar Patrika, and his uncle was the physician and author Dr. Sarasi Lal Sarkar.

Sarkar spent his early days in Dhenkanal, Odisha, where his father served as a resident tutor and later as the Dewan for the ruler of the Princely State of Dhenkanal. He later studied at the Town School in Shyambazar, Calcutta, and graduated with a Science degree from the Scottish Church College. Initially choosing a career in chartered accountancy, he became a Fellow of the Institute of Chartered Accountants of India. However, at the request of his father and Suresh Chandra Majumdar, he left his profession to join the Ananda Bazar Patrika.

== Career ==
=== Journalism ===
Initiated into the Swadeshi movement at a young age, Sarkar became a member of the All-Bengal Students' Association in 1932 and served six months of rigorous imprisonment for his involvement in the nationalist movement. After assuming editorial responsibilities, he stepped away from political factions to maintain the newspaper's tradition of neutrality.

After gaining experience across various departments, Sarkar became Editor-in-Chief of the Ananda Bazar Patrika on 1 February 1959. He also served as the editor of the literary magazine Desh from 1957 to 1976 and was the founding editor of the children's periodical Anandamela (April 1975 – April 1976). Under his leadership, the Ananda Bazar Group undertook several innovative ventures, reaching the pinnacle of popularity and establishing itself as a prestigious institution in Indian newspaper publishing.

He was associated with numerous journalistic organizations, including the Press Institute of India, the Indian and Eastern Newspaper Society, the International Press Institute, the Commonwealth Press Union, the Press Foundation of Asia, the Audit Bureau of Circulation, PTI, UNI, and the Bengal Chamber of Commerce and Industry.

=== Literary and cultural contributions ===
Sarkar was deeply devoted to Bengali literature and culture. He was the driving force behind the grand exhibition and fair celebrating the bicentenary of Bengali printing and publishing and served as the chief mentor of the annual Banga Sanskriti Sammelan. The Ananda Purashkar literary award was introduced during his tenure as editor. He actively supported classical Bengali literature while encouraging both veteran and novice authors to write for Desh.

A passionate music enthusiast, Sarkar learned to play the sitar under maestro Timir Baran. He was an avid listener of Indian classical music, Rabindra Sangeet, and kirtan, with Sarang and Malhar being his favorite ragas.

=== Sports and mountaineering ===
He was a sports enthusiast who regularly watched cricket and football. Sarkar was a pioneer member of the National Cricket Club and served as Vice-President of the Mohun Bagan Athletic Club. Between 1960 and 1969, the Ananda Bazar Patrika sponsored several Bengali mountaineering expeditions under his active patronage. He also served as President of the Parbat Abhijatri Sangha and the Jatiya Krira o Shakti Sangha.

== Personal life ==
Sarkar married Aloka Sarkar on 5 August 1943. She was the youngest daughter of Sachindra Krishna Datta, hailing from the prominent Datta family of Rambagan, Calcutta. They had four sons—Aveek Sarkar, Arup Kumar Sarkar, Adhip Kumar Sarkar, and Asani Sarkar—and one daughter, Sarbani Rath.

== Death ==
Asoke Kumar Sarkar died from a sudden heart attack on 17 February 1983, at the age of 70. He collapsed while delivering his address as the chief guest at a book launch during the Calcutta Book Fair.

== Memberships ==
- Patron, Nandaghunti Expedition Organization (1960)
- President, Banga Sanskriti Sammelan (1962–1967)
- Vice-President, Mohun Bagan Athletic Club (1964–1983)
- President, National Cricket Club (1967–1978)
- President, Bengal National Chamber of Commerce and Industry (1969)
- Chairman, Press Trust of India (1970–1972)
- Director, International Press Institute (1973–1976)
- President, Board of Trustees, Press Foundation of Asia (Elected 1978)
- Chairman, Audit Bureau of Circulation Ltd. (1978–1979)
- President, Nikhil Bharat Banga Sahitya Sammelan, Tinsukia Session (1979)
- President, Manimela
- Fellow, Institute of Chartered Accountants
- President, Parvat Abhiyatri Sangha
- President, Jatiya Krida Sangha

== Awards ==
- Padma Bhushan for distinguished journalism, conferred by the Government of India (1967).
- Critics Circle's (India) Award for outstanding contribution to journalism (1982, awarded posthumously).

== Selected works ==
Essays and Publications
Title	Date of Publication	Publisher
Bangla filme bhumika nirbachan	2 January 1944	Ananda Bazar Patrika
Ei sankat o panchambahini	9 December 1962	Ananda Bazar Patrika
Ei juddha o manobal	22 December 1962	Desh
Banga sanskriti sammelan	16 March 1963	Ananda Bazar Patrika
Jatiya sanhati kon pathe . . .	10 January 1965	Ananda Bazar Patrika
Kedarnath Chattopadhyay	18 May 1965	Ananda Bazar Patrika
Lokmata Nibedita	4 December 1965	Desh
Pathakera santushto ei amar purashkar	21 May 1972	Ananda Bazar Patrika (Subarna Jayanti Issue)
Millan melar mul sur sampriti	16 November 1972	Ananda Bazar Patrika
Bahure milano niye khela	16 February 1974	Ananda Bazar Patrika
Banger sanskriti, sei sange bharatero	2 January 1976	Ananda Bazar Patrika
Amar pratham dekha	27 September 1977	Ananda Bazar Patrika
Nikhil Bharat, Banga Sahitya Sammelan, 1979, 51st Session, Tinsukia – President's speech	6 February 1979	Nikhil Bharat, Banga Sahitya Sammelan (Booklet)
Bangali Visvakarma hok, tobei tar bani aradhana sarthak	7 February 1979	Ananda Bazar Patrika
Aajker Israel: Mishar Israel / Keui judhha chaay na (1)	7 July 1979	Ananda Bazar Patrika
Bharater lok morute phul photachhe (2)	9 July 1979	Ananda Bazar Patrika
Israel sankhya laghu samasya (3)	11 July 1979	Ananda Bazar Patrika
Nirab prajukti biplab chine dana bendhe utheche	23 October 1982	Ananda Bazar Patrika

== Bibliography ==
- Nikhil Sarkar. Sri Asoke Kumar Sarkar 1912-1983. Sri Asoke Kumar Sarkar 1319 – 1389, Shraddhanjali (pp. 77-80).
- Sagarmoy Ghosh. Amar jathartha sahamormi. Sri Asoke Kumar Sarkar 1319 – 1389, Shraddhanjali (p. 26).
- Jamini Gangopadhyay. Gaaner jonnyo pagal. Sri Asoke Kumar Sarkar 1319 – 1389, Shraddhanjali (p. 72).
- Ananda Bazar Patrika, Feb 18, 1983 (pp. 1, 4).
