= Ichchhemotir Gappo =

2015 Indian Bengali film

- Directed by: Atanu Hazra, Adinath Das, Angsuman Sengupta
- Written by: Angsuman Sengupta
- Produced by: Pradip Churiwal & Saikat Mitra
- Starring: Saswata Chatterjee, Tanushree Chakraborty, Saheb Bhattacharya, Koninika Banerjee, Aparajita Auddy, Biswajit Chakraborty, Biswanath Basu, Chitra Sen, Dwijen Bandhopadhyay, Kohinoor Sen Barat
- Cinematography: Adinath Das
- Edited by: Sanjib Dutta
- Music by: Kalyan Sen Barat
- Release date: 20 February 2015
- Running time: 137 minutes
- Country: India
- Language: Bengali

Ichchhemotir Gappo (transl. the story of Ichchhemoti) is a 2015 Bengali film directed by Atanu Hazra, Adinath Das, and Kaushik Sengupta, and produced by Pradip Churiwal and Saikat Mitra for Macneill Media Pvt Ltd. The music is composed by Kalyan Sen Barat. It is Macneill Media's second film, after Durbin.

== Storyline ==
Ichchemotir Gappo is a film about human relationships and how they evolve over time. Contemporary dance and music form an integral part of the movie. Kalyan Sen Barat draws inspiration from the Salil Chowdhury era of orchestration, utilizing the voices of Rupankar and Srikanto Acharya, referencing the golden period of Bangla cinema. Saswata Chatterjee and Tanushree Chakraborty provide more contemporary sounds.

The story revolves around the budding relationship between its two central characters, Ichche and Neel, despite their contrasting personalities. Ichche is a free-spirited danseuse with a completely different take on the dialectics of love and relationships compared to Neel. Although attracted to each other, their love remains unrequited, and, to complicate matters, a fashion photographer in Bijoy is also attracted to Ichche and has designs to make her into a big star. In the beginning of the story, Tagore's Uttaran remains in the background.

Ichche belongs to a dance group headed by a male dancer named Srijan, who gives stellar performances of male heroes, despite the fact that he is also homosexual. His love remains unrequited until he meets Subhash. Between the dance school and music school, there is a small tea shop where a little boy named Madhav supplies tea to both schools. A small-time film producer, played by Sadhan, and a man named Madhav are also enamored by Ichche and in their own ways show their love for her.

== Cast ==
- Saswata Chatterjee as Nil
- Tanusree Chakraborty as Ichchhe
- Aparajita Auddy as Smriti
- Saheb Bhattacharya as Rupam
- Biswajit Chakraborty as Bijoy
- Dwijen Bandopadhyay as Sadhan
- Koneenica Banerjee as Sanji
- Biswanath Basu as Kanchan
- Kohinoor Sen Barat as Srijan
