= ABP Majha =

Marathi-language TV news channel

- Logo used since 2020
- Country: India
- Headquarters: Mumbai, Maharashtra

Programming
- Language: Marathi

Ownership
- Owner: ABP Group
- Sister channels: ABP News; ABP Ananda; ABP Sanjha; ABP Asmita; ABP Ganga; ABP Live; ABP Nadu

History
- Launched: 22 June 2007; 19 years ago
- Former names: Star Majha (2007–2012)

Links
- Website: marathi.abplive.com

ABP Majha is a Marathi news TV channel based in Mumbai, Maharashtra. Rajiv khandekar is the executive editor of the channel. Anandabazar Patrika News is the abbreviation for ABP News Network Pvt. Ltd. i.e. ABP Group operates a multiple language news channel in India. Its headquarters are in the Indian city of Noida.

The channel was previously called Star Majha until 1 June 2012. ABP Group acquired its ownership from Star, making it a part of the larger ABP news network.

== Editorial leadership ==
Rajiv Khandekar Senior Executive Vice President, News & Production, ABP News and ABP Majha in ABP Group and was associated with the channel during its formative years, contributing to its development as a Marathi news broadcaster with a focus on political and current affairs coverage.

Sarita Kaushik has been serving as the Executive Editor of ABP Majha since December 2024. She previously held the position of Deputy Executive Editor and Channel Head at the network. With over 25 years of experience across print, television, and digital journalism, She is among the early women editors to head a regional television news channel in India and has led programming initiatives such as the primetime programme Zero Hour and the podcast Coffee with Kaushik.
