= Shob Bhooturey =

- Film poster
- Directed by: Birsa Dasgupta
- Screenplay by: Kallol Lahiri
- Story by: Kallol Lahiri
- Produced by: Shrikant Mohta; Mahendra Soni
- Starring: Abir Chatterjee; Sohini Sarkar; Supriyo Dutta
- Cinematography: Gairik Sarkar
- Edited by: Subho Pramanik
- Music by: Subho Pramanik
- Production company: Shree Venkatesh Films
- Distributed by: Shree Venkatesh Films
- Release date: 2017
- Country: India
- Language: Bengali
- Budget: ₹16 million
- Box office: ₹14.5 million

Shob Bhooturey (English: Everything is paranormal; Bengali: সব ভুতুড়ে) is a 2017 Indian Bengali language horror thriller film directed by Birsa Dasgupta and produced by Shrikant Mohta, and Mahendra Soni under the banners of Shree Venkatesh Films. The film stars Abir Chatterjee, Sohini Sarkar and Supriyo Dutta in lead roles. The film was released on 8 September 2017.

== Plot ==
Aniket's father used to run a magazine where he would publish the supernatural incidents he had experienced. He would visit any place that has anything to do with a supernatural entity, witness the same, and pen down in his stories. But Aniket doesn't believe in ghosts and after his father's death he wants to start his own business and to close the magazine. In the meantime, something unexplainable starts taking place in a primary school of a village. The headmaster of the school seeks help from Aniket. Then Aniket promised to help reluctantly. A weird looking woman Nandini, who claims to have unusual power of seeing ghosts also joins him. He found her in the middle of road while driving. She claims that Aniket's father had given her a letter and sent her. However, Aniket initially did not believe this, as his father had died a long time ago, but to his horror Nandini informed him about the hidden will file of Aniket's father which Aniket himself had been finding, to sell his father's business house which sold a monthly copy of a horror series named "Shob Bhooturey" (সব ভূতুড়ে) in Bengali. A series of incidents follow which help Nandini prove her claims, Aniket discovered her strategy and took her to his team. The old editor of Aniket's father's magazine, Kripa Babu completes the team of three. The next day, Nandini goes missing as Kripa Babu calls her number numerous times. Also, Aniket goes to find her ladies hostel, given the address by Nandini herself, he finds a graveyard instead. Disappointed and helpless of what to do, they still set out for Kushumpur that night. Again, all of a sudden, Nandini comes out on the road in front of their car, the same way Aniket had met Nandini the first time. Aniket is angry and starts asking her questions. But Nandini claims to have been at her hostel the entire day as she was suffering from a mild fever. Kripa Babu settles the tension between both of them and they finally set out for their destination in heavy rain and thunderstorm. All of them finally visit the village and find out reasons about the unexplainable incidents which eventually is related to ghosts of small kids from school. Nandini claimed to see a little girl, Mini, who had also died in the incident, and this girl had been guiding her all way long. This convinces Aniket and Kripa Babu of Nandini's abilities. They find out that one of the headmaster's ex-student, Robin Babu, had planned to renovate the terrace of the school, but the roof unfortunately does not get build strong enough because of faulty materials. One rainy day, the headmaster had punished 6 kids for not preparing their lessons, and asked them to stay on the terrace in the drenching downpour. But, to his horror, just as he goes to leave them, the roof breaks down and eventually the children die. This was completely left unresolved by the villagers. The team, with major help from Nandini, solves the mystery and frees the village from the curse of the kids. Later, at the end, it is revealed that Nandini is herself a ghost, and she had come to play for this specific investigation only. The movie ends on an eerie note, with an open ending, where Nandini is seen to give a scary smile.

== Cast ==
- Abir Chatterjee as Aniket Sen
- Sohini Sarkar as Nandini
- Biswajit Chakraborty as Headmaster Babu
- Koushik Kar as Robin Babu
- Supriyo Dutta as Kripa babu (Editor)
- Ambarish Bhattacharya as Traffic Sergeant
- Ankita Majhi as Fotik's mother
- Gambhira Bhattacharya as Mini's father
- Saoli Chattopadhyay as Mini's mother
- Ida Dasgupta as Mini

== Soundtrack ==
No.	Title	Singer (s)	Length
1.	"Nei Alo"	Madhubanti Bagchi	03:44
2.	"Golpo"	Aruna Das	03:34
