= Chander Bari =

2007 Bengali film directed by Tarun Majumdar

- DVD cover
- Directed by: Tarun Majumdar
- Story by: Pracheta Gupta
- Produced by: Rosevally films
- Starring: Soham Chakraborty; Ranjit Mallick; Babul Supriyo; Laboni Sarkar; Soumitra Chatterjee; Koel Mallick; Rituparna Sengupta
- Release date: 2007
- Country: India
- Language: Bengali

Chander Bari is a 2007 Bengali film directed by Tarun Majumdar. The film centers on a middle class joint family. The film is based on a Bengali story written by Pracheta Gupta. Majumdar used some Rabindra Sangeets in this film.

== Plot ==
The Sanyals are a large extended family composed of the nonagenarian grandfather, (Haradhan Banerjee), his son (Ranjit Mallick), daughter-in-law (Laboni Sarkar) who rules over the house like a female Hitler, reincarnated, and their children of whom two, a daughter (Koel Mallick) and son (Rishi Kaushik) live together in a beautiful mansion in Bhawanipur. There seems to be more servants in their house than family members, extending the virtues and parameters of the ideal ‘joint’ family. The film starts with everyone being excited about the return of the elder son (Babul Supriyo) from LONDON, UK where he had gone for some business related work. However, all hell breaks loose, when he returns with a wife (Rituparna Sengupta) and her child from a former marriage in tow. Her first husband with underworld links was killed in police crossfire. Everyone accepts the new additions to the Sanyal family except the mother-in-law who refuses to even acknowledge her presence. The story revolves around how these two women build bridges to keep the joint family intact, with most of the credit going to the beautiful daughter-in-law.

== Cast ==
- Ranjit Mallick as Shyam Sundar Sanyal
- Laboni Sarkar as Gayatri Sanyal
- Babul Supriyo as Pradeep Kumar Sanyal
- Rituparna Sengupta as Sutapa Sanyal
- Koel Mallick as Nandita Sanyal
- Rishi Kaushik as Joydeep Sanyal
- Soumitra Chatterjee as Harinath
- Tathoi Deb as Rikhia Sanyal
- Soham Chakraborty
- Aritra Dutta Banik
- Dwijen Bandopadhyay
- Sarbori Mukherjee
- Sumit Samadder
- Shritama Bhattacharjee
- Tanima Sen
- Swanakamal Dutta
- Shraboni Bonik
- Chaitali Mukhopadhyay

== Music ==
Some of the tracks used in this film were from Rabindra Sangeet.

- "Bhenge Mor Ghar Er Chabi"
- "Chand Er Hashir Bnadh Bhengechhe"
- "Gun Gun Bhromora Boslo Eshe"
- "Bandh Bhenge Dao"
- "Debo Na, Debo Na Sara To Jotoi Dako" (Singer: Jojo, Sujay Bhowmick)
- "Ore Chitrarekha Dore Bandhilo Ke" [Indranil Sen]

== Awards ==
- Special Screening at Sydney Film Festival, 2016.
