= Professor Shonku =

Fictional Indian inventor

- Professor Shonku (in the middle) along with his English friend Jeremy Saunders and German friend Wilhelm Kroll
- First appearance: Byomjatrir Diary
- Last appearance: Drexel Islander Ghatana (Incomplete)
- Created by: Satyajit Ray
- Portrayed by: Dhritiman Chatterjee
- Voiced by: Mir Afsar Ali (Mirchi Bangla), Deep Ghosh (Mirchi Bangla); John Snyder (Animated film)

In-universe information
- Full name: Trilokeshwar Shonku
- Nicknames: Tilu, Shanks
- Title: Professor
- Occupation: Physicist; Scientific inventor; Professor of Physics at Scottish Church College (formerly)
- Family: Shonku
- Relatives: Tripureswar Shonku (father); Batukeshwar Shonku (great-great grandfather (অতি বৃদ্ধ প্রপিতামহ)
- Religion: Hinduism
- Nationality: Indian
- Residence: Giridih, Kolkata
- Pets: Newton (cat, Permanent); Macaw (macaw, Temporary); Dhimu (slow loris, Temporary); Corvus (crow, Temporary); EA (Extraordinary Animal - a new type of undiscovered monkey type animal, Temporary)
- Robots: Bidhusekhar; Compu; Robu
- Language skills: Capable of speaking 69 languages
- Mother tongue: Bengali
- Degree: B.sc; Honorary Doctorate from Swedish Academy of Sciences

Professor Trilokeshwar Shonku (Bengali: প্রফেসর শঙ্কু) is a fictional scientist and inventor created by Satyajit Ray in a series of Bengali science fiction books of the same name published from 1965 on. He is the central protagonist of the series. Professor Shonku resides in Giridih. His house contains a laboratory, and he lives with his pet cat, Newton, named after Sir Isaac Newton and his man-servant, Prahlad. He was born in the year of 1911 on 16 June but his year of death is unknown.

== Character development ==
=== Introduction to the character ===
Professor Trilokeshwar Shonku (known popularly as Professor Shonku) is the protagonist of Satyajit Ray's series "The Adventures of Professor Shonku."

The first story of the series introduced him, in "ব্যোমযাত্রীর ডায়রি" (Byomjatrir Diary).

Professor Shonku's father Tripureshwar was a physician. Professor Shonku was born on 16 June 1911. His nickname is Tilu. Professor Shonku passed matriculation examination of the University of Calcutta at the age of 12. At the age of 16, Professor Shonku received his BSc degree with honours in two subjects, Physics and Chemistry. In Satyajit Ray's last finished novel of the series, Swarnaparnee, that was initially published in the Special Puja issue of Anandamela children's magazine in 1992, it was mentioned that at the age of 20, Professor Shonku took his first job as a professor of physics in Calcutta's Scottish Church College.

Professor Shonku is a polyglot who knows 69 languages. His pet cat 'Newton' is 24 years old.

=== Inspiration ===
Ray admitted that he had based Prof. Shonku on the character Professor Challenger, by Arthur Conan Doyle, and a character created by Ray's father Sukumar Ray named Hesoram Hushiar. Ray himself described Shonku as a “mild-mannered Professor Challenger”.

== Recurring characters ==
- Avinash Chandra Majumdar (referred to as Avinash Babu) - Shonku's neighbor and a non-believer in science. He never understands the magnitude of Shonku's scientific breakthroughs and often finds them amusing, humiliating or insignificant.
- Nakur Chandra Biswas - a man with several supernatural powers which he acquired from a ball lightning incident. He is a well-wisher of Shonku, and has the ability to see visions of the future along with reading minds. He lives in Makardaha.
- Jeremy Saunders - a British biologist residing in London, Shonku's closest friend.
- Wilhelm Crole - a German anthropologist with interests in paranormal activities.
- John Summerville - a British scientist and geologist, also residing in London.
- Prahllad - Shonku's trusted servant and housekeeper for about 27 years.
- Newton (cat) - Shonku's long time pet cat. With the help of inventions, he prolonged his cat's age to 24 years.

== Inventions of Professor Shonku ==
(This list may be incomplete.)

- Miracurall – A drug that cures any ailment, the name is a short-form of Miracle Cure for All Ailments.
- Annihillin – A pistol capable of annihilating (vanishing or vaporizing) anything that is living, invented because Shonku does not like bloodshed. It does not work on non-living things (according to Shonku'r Congo Abhijan, but works on them according to Shokur Shonir Dawsha).
- Annihillin pill – A medicine capable of curing 236 conditions or diseases. This was superseded by Miracurall.
- Shankoplane – A small hovercraft created using anti-gravity technology, capable of vertical take-off and landing. It uses Turboline as a fuel and has an impeccable mileage.
- Turboline – A sandal-scented green fuel for Shankoplane.
- Shankovite – The anti-gravity alloy by which Shankoplane was made.
- Shankoplast – Wonderful plastic.
- Shankolone – A variation of Shankoplast.
- Omniscope – A combination of telescope, microscope and X-ray-scope which looks like and can be worn as spectacles.
- Air-conditioning pill – A capsule to be kept below the tongue (and later in the shirt pocket), that keeps the body temperature normal in extremes of climate.
- Somnolin – A sleeping pill that will work in any condition.
- Evolutin – A drug that makes people evolve 10 thousand years in 5 minutes.
- Compudium – Short for Computerized Medium, a device to contact departed souls. Designed by Shonku along with Wilhelm Crole and Rudolf Haine.
- Compu – It's a computer brain with 10 crore delicate circuits in it. Designed by Shonku along with Matsue, Dr John Kenseli, Dr Stephen Merivel, Dr Stavs, Dr Ugatti, Prof. Straton, Prof. Kutna, Prof. Markus Wingfield (as a replacement of S.Merivel) and the workers of Namura Institute of Japan, which accidentally develops artificial intelligence.
- RememBrain – A device that makes people remember the things they forgot.
- Bidhushekhar – A mechanical man (robot) with AI built with very cheap materials, programmed to answer any question asked to it.
- Linguagraph – A device that translates any earth language to any other. The translation capability is supposed to include animal languages, and works on cats, plants, ants and even viruses too. However, it does not work to translate the speech of aliens.
- Intellectron – A device to measure intelligence.
- Ornithon – A device to educate birds. Professor Shonku was able to "educate" a crow named Corvus using this device.
- Snuff gun – A gun that causes sneezing for thirty-three hours.
- Nightmare pill - A nightmare inducing sleeping pill.
- Fish pill – Space food for cats.
- Rocket – A rocket for space adventures.
- Botica indica – A pill made from sap of Banyan tree to ward off the need for food and water for 24 hours.
- Special room-freshner – A room freshner made up of 36 different flower essence.
- Invisibility drug – A drug to make living things invisible for at least 10 hours.
- Carbothin Fabric – A fabric which is non-conductor of electricity and saves from electrical shocks.( As seen in the story "Shonku O Aschorjo Putul") Shonku made a jacket out of it which he wears all the time.
- Tiranium phosphate – A very strong and dangerous acid.
- Annihilin acid – The most powerful and dangerous acid invented by Shonku.
- Carbo-diabolic acid
- Nitro-annihilin Acid
- Phoro-sotanic acid
- Polar Repelion Theory
- Neo-Specetroscope – A device to contact departed souls. Almost similar to Compudium.
- Untitled drug to increase olfactory ability of human beings
- EA (Extraordinary Animal, A small specimen of all evolution forms of human) – Along with German biochemist Humbolt.
- Luminimax – A small ball to give the light of 200-watt power when ignited.
- Oxymore powder – Powder to help intake of Oxygen at higher altitudes.
- CameRapid – Instant color photographs after taking a snap.
- An alchemical liquid to transform living things to pure gold – Recreated along with Krol and Saunders following the process of Savedra the alchemist.
- NerVigour – A tonic to the steady the nervous system.
- NerVita pills – Helps as a stimulant during arduous journeys.
- X and anti-X – Drug to change the personality of a human from Dr Jekyl to Mr Hyde. The same drug was invented by Dr Danieli.
- Time machine – Formulated the theoretical groundwork and planned to build a time machine.
- Tried to contact Extraterrestrial life
- Shonku – Frankenstein Formula – Revision of Baron Victor Frankenstein's formula to bring back the dead to life, using mains power instead of natural lightning and without changing their brains.
- Electric pistol – A tazer like pistol to fire 400 volts of electric shock.
- Cerebrellant – Medicine to improve brain function.
- Marjarin – Medicine for increasing the lifespan of cats.
- Ointment to protect from insect bites, especially mosquitoes and barracuda flies
- Anesthium pistol – Tranquilizer gun, jet spraying semi-liquid paralytic agent.
- MangOrange fruit – A delicious and nutritious variety of hybrid of mango and orange, it earned him a doctorate from Swedish academy of sciences. Bengali name: 'Amla'(Aam + Kamla).
- TrishNashok – A thirst quencher pill.
- Tea and Coffee pills
- Artificial diamond - Created along with Crole and Siddique following the process of Nefrudet.
- Microsonograph - Machine to hear subsonic sounds and speeches.
- Robu - AI capable robot which gains sentience.

== Summary of adventures ==
Professor Shonku had many adventures, in both real and fantastical places, some with historical leanings and some with great revelations connected to human civilisation.

Excerpts of some interesting adventures follow:

- Byomjatrir Diary (English: Diary of a Space Traveler)

The first story in the series is about the Professor's journey to Mars on a rocket of his own manufacture, with Bidhusekhar, a robot, Prahlad, his man-servant and Newton the cat for company. After a fearful encounter with the Martians, they flee from Mars, and land on planet Tafa, populated by large black ants who welcome Shonku as one of their own.

- Professor Shonku o Khoka (English: Khoka):

A child hurts his head, thereby acquiring extraordinary ability of omniscience, by speaking in multiple languages, and reciting lines of Shakespeare. He is brought under Shonku's care, in a desperate attempt by the parents to bring the child back to normal. Finally, he cures himself by a concoction of his own creation, including dangerous chemicals, some of which are Shonku's inventions.

- Professor Shonku o Har:

Professor Shonku meets a fakir who has this ability to re-animate a living thing from its bones. Shonku tries to investigate, and to do so, he records the spell using his recorder, which enrages the fakir and causes him to curse Shonku. Later in his life, Shonku along with an assistant discovers the remains of a dinosaur in a cave. The curse starts to take effect and the dinosaur comes back to life.

- Professor Shonku o Golok Rahasya:

Shonku gets hold of a mysterious sphere which changes its color spontaneously and emanates various sounds. In fact, the sphere is a planet from another solar system and it has brought extraterrestrial life along.

Shonku holding Newton (on left) and Abinashbabu and Nakur Chandra Biswas (on right, respectively), Prahlad (at back)

- Swapnadwip:

The Professor is haunted by a repeating dream where he along, with his friends, are stranded on a beautiful exotic island without any inhabitants. His friends also experience the same dream. It is as if the mysterious island is beckoning great scientists of the world to it. The plants seep people's intelligence and attracts their attention using dreams.

- Ek Shringo Abhijan:

Shonku goes to Tibet, to find out about a Unicorn which is reported to be seen there. In the adventure, Shonku discovers a place where everybody's dreams come true... a Utopia.

- Mahakasher doot:

Shonku tries to prove that human civilization has prospered thanks to the help of some alien civilisation that comes to Earth every 5000 years and teaches them something extraordinary. What are they going to reveal this time?

- Nakurbabu o El Dorado:

Nokurbabu has the ability to make others see what he is thinking. He and Shonku are caught in a chain of events that lead them to the deep jungles of South America where El Dorado has always eluded discovery.

- Professor Shonku o UFO:

Several sightings of UFOs makes headlines worldwide. However, this news is outdone by the news of the demolition of some of the greatest monuments of mankind. The Eiffel Tower and the Angkor Wat are destroyed, and the aliens are blamed. Nokurbabu joins Shonku and other scientists who discover that the UFO has its base in the Gobi desert. They find the UFO and go aboard. They are captured immediately, not by the aliens, but by a mad scientist who is the present owner of the UFO and who is in fact the destroyer of the monuments, driven because he was denied his due honour in the scientific community. His next target is the Taj Mahal.

- Swarnaparnee:

This is the story of a young Shonku and the invention of his Miracurall and the time when he visited Germany on the eve of World War II. This story tells about how Shonku went on to meet Hermann Göring and evaded the Nazis.

== Professor Shonku books ==
- Professor Shonku New Script, Calcutta 1965.
- Professor Shonkur Kandokarkhana (Professor Shonku's Deeds). Ananda Publishers, Calcutta 1970.
- Shabash Professor Shonku (Bravo Professor Shonku). Ananda Publishers, Calcutta 1974.
- Mahasankatey Shonku (Shonku in Deep Peril). Ananda Publishers, Calcutta 1977.
- Swayang Professor Shonku (None other than Professor Shonku). Ananda Publishers, Calcutta 1980.
- Shonku Ekai Aksho (Shonku, All in All). Ananda Publishers, Calcutta 1983.
- Punashcha Professor Shonku (Shonku once again). Ananda Publishers, Calcutta 1993.
- Selam Professor Shonku (Hats off, Professor Shonku). Ananda Publishers, Calcutta, 1995.
- Shonku Samagra (Complete Shonku collection) Ananda Publishers, Kolkata January 2002, ISBN 81-7756-232-0
- Swamohimay Shonku (Two incomplete novels - Intellectron and Carpathian Atonko by Satyajit Ray, completed by Sudip Deb) Kalpabiswa, Kolkata 2020

== Professor Shonku in other media ==
=== Comics ===
Some Professor Shonku stories have been made into comics and published by Ananda Publishers.

=== Radio ===
In the Sunday Suspense Series of 98.3 Radio Mirchi several Professor Shonku stories were performed by RJs, like Mir, Deep, Agni and Somak. They became very popular.

=== Animated ===
In 2017, an English-language animated film titled The Shonku Diaries: A Unicorn Adventure was released, based on Ek Shringa Abhijan.

=== Telefilm ===
A telefilm Professor Shonku O Golok Rahasya is released on DD Bangla.

=== Film ===
The film was announced officially in November 2017. It is titled Professor Shonku O El Dorado. Pre-production of the film started in 2018 and it was released on 20 December 2019. The film is based on the story Nakurbabu O El Dorado. Actor Dhritiman Chatterjee, who acted in a number of films by Satyajit Ray, portrayed the title role in the film, produced by Shree Venkatesh Films. In the film Nakurbabu is portrayed by Subhasish Mukherjee. The film is directed by the son of Satyajit Ray, Sandip Ray.

== See also ==
- Satyajit Ray
- Bengali science fiction
- Feluda
- Tarini Khuro
- Culture of Bengal
- Culture of West Bengal
- Bengali literature
- History of Bengali literature
