= ABP Sanjha =

Indian news channel

- Headquarters: Chandigarh, Punjab

Programming
- Language: Punjabi
- Picture format: 576i (SDTV 16:9, 4:3), 1080i (HDTV)

Ownership
- Owner: ABP Group
- Sister channels: ABP News; ABP Majha; ABP Asmita; ABP Ananda; ABP Ganga; ABP Live; ABP Nadu

History
- Launched: 20 April 2014; 12 years ago

Links
- Website: punjabi.abplive.com

Availability

Streaming media
- Live Streaming: Watch Live

ABP Sanjha is the Punjabi language news channel, launched in 2014, by Media Content and Communication Services (MCCS), a news broadcasting company, owned by the ABP Group.

== See also ==
- Lists of television channels in India
