= Chabiwala: The Keysmith =

2021 Indian Bengali-language film

- Theatrical release poster
- Directed by: Raja Ghosh
- Screenplay by: Raja Ghosh
- Story by: Raja Ghosh
- Produced by: Raj Kumar Bhuina
- Starring: Subhasish Mukhopadhyay; Soumen Chakraborty; Koushik Kar; Amrita Chattopadhyay
- Cinematography: Prosenjit Chowdhury
- Edited by: Anirban Maity
- Music by: Nabarun Bose
- Production companies: Pepperpot Pixels; White Owl Entertainment
- Distributed by: SSR Cinema
- Release dates: 2021 (Thrissur International Film Festival); 6 June 2025
- Running time: 119 minutes
- Country: India
- Language: Bengali

Chabiwala: The Keysmith is a 2021 Indian Bengali independent poignant drama film written and directed by Raja Ghosh. It has been produced by Raj Kumar Bhuina under the banners of Pepperpot Pixels and White Owl Entertainment. It has been co-produced by Dhagaa Production and Satadeep Saha, and presented by Suvankar Mitra and Manasi Sinha. The film stars Subhasish Mukhopadhyay, Soumen Chakraborty, Koushik Kar and Amrita Chattopadhyay in the lead roles while Rahul Banerjee and Sohag Sen play other pivotal roles.

The first look pictures of the lead characters from the film were released in March 2025. The film has been shot over a short schedule of 20 days. Principal photography took place in Kolkata and some rural locations in West Bengal. Nabarun Bose has composed the music of the film. Prosenjit Chowdhury did the cinematography while Anirban Maity handled the editing. The film had its first screening at the 17th Thrissur International Film Festival in 2021. Subsequently, it was screened at around 30 film festivals. It was released in the theatres on 6 June 2025.

== Synopsis ==
After losing their work in the village, key-makers Bhaben and Nagen come to Kolkata. Bhaben starts searching for his former lover Fatima. Their relationship was not accepted by Fatima's family because of their different religions backgrounds. Fatima was married off in Kolkata by her family.

As Bhaben looks for Fatima, he meets many people from different parts of the city. Each of them has lost a key in some way. For some, it is a physical key, while for others it is something connected to their personal lives. Through these encounters, Bhaben sees different sides of life in the city.

== Cast ==
- Subhasish Mukhopadhyay as Amlan, a despondent writer
- Soumen Chakraborty as Nagen, a senile key-maker
- Koushik Kar as Bhaben, a young key-maker
- Amrita Chattopadhyay as Fatima, Bhaben's love interest
- Rahul Banerjee as Bhukharam, an odd-jobber
- Sohag Sen as Zaira, a criminal lawyer
- Dhritiman Chatterjee as the owner of an advertising agency
- Shankar Debnath
- Debapratim Dasgupta
- Manashree Biswas

== Reception ==
=== Critical reception ===
Shubhadeep Banerjee of The Wall rated the film 8.5/10 stars and wrote "Chabiwala will touch people of all classes, this is where the film is unique. It is not known how long such films will be available in the theatres! Not everyone has the eye of a jeweller to recognize genuine things. The effort of going to see them will be worthwhile." He praised the direction, the director's usage of the screen as a canvas, the performance of all the actors, the make-up, the screenplay, the cinematography, the editing and the depiction of the life of people from various fields of life.

Shampali Moulik of Sangbad Pratidin reviewed the film and opined "Ultimately, it can be said that Chabiwala is a film to watch on the big screen. Every frame of the film is very beautiful. Although very faint, the frames in the film is a reminder of Buddhadev Dasgupta's frame-concept." She appreciated the central idea of the film, the performance of all the actors, the concept of dawn displayed in the film, the depiction of the life of people from various fields of life and the cinematography but bemoaned the weak screenplay.

== Accolades ==
Selected festival screenings

- 17th Thrissur International Film Festival (Indian Panorama section)
- London Film Festival
- 6th Sri Lanka International World Film Festival: Best Director (Feature Film) — Raja Ghosh, Best Supporting Actor (Breakthrough) — Subhasish Mukhopadhyay, Best Actor (Jury Special) — Kaushik Kar, Best Actress (Breakthrough) — Amrita Chattopadhyay and Best Background Score — Nabarun Bose
- Jharkhand International Film Festival: Best Actress - Amrita Chattopadhyay
- 28th Kolkata International Film Festival
- London Bengali Film Festival
