= Professor Shonku O El Dorado =

2019 science fiction film by Sandip Ray

- First look poster
- Directed by: Sandip Ray
- Screenplay by: Sandip Ray
- Story by: Satyajit Ray
- Based on: Nakur Babu O El Dorado by Satyajit Ray
- Produced by: Shrikant Mohta; Mahendra Soni
- Starring: Dhritiman Chatterjee Subhasish Mukhopadhyay
- Cinematography: Soumik Haldar
- Edited by: Subrata Roy
- Music by: Sandip Ray
- Production company: Shree Venkatesh Films
- Release date: 20 December 2019
- Country: India
- Language: Bengali

Professor Shonku O El Dorado (transl. Professor Shonku and El Dorado) is a Bengali science fiction adventure drama film directed by Sandip Ray based on Nakur Babu O El Dorado, a story of Satyajit Ray. Dhritiman Chatterjee portrayed the protagonist character of Professor Shonku. The film was released theatrically on 20 December 2019.

== Plot ==
This is an adventure story of the fictional genius scientist and inventor Professor Shonku visiting the heart of the Amazon forests in search of the mythical city of El Dorado. One day, a typical Bengali gentleman Nakur Chandra Biswas alias Nakur Babu comes to meet him in Shonku's house in Giridih. He lives in Makardaha. Shanku realises that Nakur Babu has supernatural power having the ability to read others' minds and see the future. Nakur Babu warns him about the upcoming incidents of São Paulo. Seeing his extrasensory power, an amazed Shonku goes to Brazil with Nakur Babu to join a science conference and the mystery begins ending in the fabled city of El Dorado deep inside the Brazilian Amazon

== Cast ==
- Dhritiman Chatterjee as Professor Shonku
- Subhasish Mukhopadhyay as Nakur Chandra Biswas
- Eduardo Munniz as Lobo
- Jacqueline Mazarella as Professor Emilia Rodriguez
- Subhrajit Dutta as Samaresh
- Ricardo Dantas as Jeremy Saunders
- Roney Facchini as Wilhelm Krol
- Augusto Cesar as Hyter
- Meyerbeer Tapajós as Mike
- Felipe Montanari as Bob
- Fernando Coelho as Solomon Bloomgarten
- Udayshankar Pal as Prahlad
- Ratan Sarkhel as Tarak

== Reception ==
The Times of India gave the film 3 stars out of five and said, "Despite a perfect look and sharp glances, Dhritiman remains less convincing as Shonku. An indefinable stiffness engulfs his performance that questions the spontaneity of the character. Meanwhile, Subhashish too goes overboard with emotion as Nakurbabu. The film involves a lot of foreign actors and they deliver a decent performance. The overall CGI also appears to be a bit flimsy. In children’s literature, Shanku makes a clean sweep with his scientific masterstrokes. However, his on-screen journey starts with a bumpy ride. Let’s hope for a better future for him."

Firstpost gave the film 3 stars out of five and said,"One of the distinguishing features of anything Satyajit Ray has ever written is the conciseness of it all. There is always something happening. Each page, each sentence is loaded with information, and often as the story progressed, a certain sense of urgency crept in. It is this sense of urgency that is missing in Sandip Ray’s screenplay."

The Indian Express Bangla gave the film 3 1/2 stars out of five.
