= The Telegraph (India) =

Daily newspaper

- The 20 August 2013 front page of The Telegraph
- Type: Daily newspaper
- Format: Broadsheet
- Owner: ABP Group
- Editor-in-chief: Atideb Sarkar
- Founded: 7 July 1982; 44 years ago
- Language: English
- Headquarters: 6, Prafulla Sarkar Street, Kolkata, West Bengal, India
- Country: India
- Circulation: 352,972 Daily (as of December 2019)
- Sister newspapers: Anandabazar Patrika
- OCLC number: 271717941
- Website: www.telegraphindia.com

The Telegraph is an Indian English daily newspaper founded and continuously published in Kolkata since 7 July 1982. It is published by the ABP Group and competes with the middle-market newspaper The Times of India. The newspaper is the eighth most-widely read English language newspaper in India, as per Indian Readership Survey (IRS) 2019.

The Telegraph has three editions, published from Kolkata, South Bengal and North Bengal.

== History ==
The Telegraph was founded on 7 July 1982. The design director of London's The Sunday Times, Edwin Taylor, designed the newspaper and provided a standard in design and editing. In 31 years, it has become the largest-circulation English daily in the eastern region published from Kolkata. In 1982, M. J. Akbar used to edit and design the daily newspaper; thus it had a major impact on newspaper journalism in India.

The Telegraph is published by media group Ananda Publishers closely associated with ABP Pvt. Ltd; the group also published Anandabazar Patrika (a Bengali language newspaper) since 13 March 1922. Apart from newspapers the group even published Bengali and English periodicals like Anandamela, Unish-Kuri, Sananda, Anandalok, Desh magazine, The Telegraph in Schools and Career.

Businessworld, which was initially part of the ABP group, has been sold to Anurag Batra, of Exchange4Media and Vikram Jhunjhunwala, an investment banker for an undisclosed amount.

The paper currently has three editions Calcutta, South Bengal and North Bengal. Previous editions include Northeast edition (Guwahati split), Jharkhand edition (Jamshedpur and Ranchi splits), Patna and Bhubaneshwar editions. Bhubaneshwar & Patna Editions ceased on 14 December 2018 and Northeast and Jharkhand editions on 20 May 2020.

== Editorial stance ==
According to an analysis of the major English language newspapers in India, during the run up to the 2014 Indian general election, the political coverage of The Telegraph was found to be less aligned in favor of the Bharatiya Janata Party and less negative of the Indian National Congress relative to that of The Times of India and the Hindustan Times.

In a 2020 Newslaundry article, the paper's coverage of the response to the COVID-19 pandemic by the central government and that of the Bengal government were contrasted; according to it the paper provided more critical coverage of the former and less of the latter in its editorials and frontpage headlines. In an interview to Outlook, The Telegraph editor R. Rajagopal rejected the conception that it was harsher on the former and soft of the latter, stating that the scope of the events decide the prominence they receive in the paper which is being noticed because only a few others are providing similar coverage and that the tendency among media outlets to seek a false balance just to be able to claim neutrality was detrimental to journalism.

== Criticism ==
In 2016, The Telegraph, in its edition took a jibe at the then HRD Minister Smriti Irani, who gave a speech on nationalism in the Lok Sabha, by calling her "Aunty National". This incident was widely criticized by many, who described the usage of such term as 'sexist' and 'misogynistic'. The News Minute wrote, "Smriti Irani deserves all the criticism we can cobble up together, but for her politics and policies. Personal attacks based on her age and gender do not bode well, and contribute to debasing the discourse on important issues. What we are perhaps forgetting is that in adopting such an acrimonious discourse against those who threaten our liberalism, and by cheering-on such headlines, we are threatening the very idea of the liberalism that we want to foster.

In 2020, The Press Council of India issued a show-cause notice to the editor of The Telegraph for its frontpage headline for the news report about former Chief Justice of India Ranjan Gogoi's nomination to the Rajya Sabha. In its frontpage headline, The Telegraph wrote, "Kovind, not Covid, did it" – a reference to the COVID-19 pandemic. In a press release, the Press Council said "satirical comments ridiculing and denigrating the first citizen of the country is uncalled for and beyond the call of fair journalistic content".

The Telegraph's headline, comparing the president to a virus, was also called out for being 'disrespectful' to Dalits. Guru Prakash, Assistant Professor (Law), Patna University and Adviser at Dalit Indian Chamber of Commerce & Industry (DICCI), said in a piece in India Today that the headline was "indicative of the deep-seated caste-based prejudice of the establishment". He added, "The establishment entails the ones who control and dominate the narrative in academia and the media."

According to Tarun Ganguly, a former bureau chief at The Telegraph, the idea behind such headlines is to be 'catchy'. Another former editor of The Telegraph states that such headlines started when Aveek Sarkar was the editor-in-chief of the newspaper. He added that Sarkar preferred a 'shock-factor' and thought these would generate more impact.

== See also ==
- List of newspapers in India by circulation
- List of newspapers in the world by circulation
