= Sailen Ghosh =

Indian Bengali Writer

- Born: 8 December 1928; Kolkata, West Bengal, India
- Died: 14 August 2016 (aged 87); Kolkata, West Bengal, India
- Citizenship: Indian
- Occupations: Writer, Dramatist
- Writing career
- Language: Bengali
- Notable works: Arun Barun Kiranmala, Aalor Aakashe Eagle, Kalo Ghora Soar, Bansabujer Dwipe

Sailen Ghosh (8 December 1928 – 14 August 2016.) was a Bengali child literator and a dramatist.

== Career ==
Sailen Ghosh played a role in the drama Dakghar, written by Rabindranath Tagore, when he was in Class IX. The death of the protagonist Amal at the end of the story affected him so much that he wrote a new drama, Gharer Kheya, by adopting the same theme.

Ghosh wrote and directed dramas for children. In 1959, he became affiliated with the Manimela organisation and started writing for them. He won several awards, including the prestigious Sangeet Natak Akademi Award, Vidyasagar Award and Jawaharlal Nehru Fellowship. He wrote several short stories, novels and dramas for children in various Bengali magazines, including Anandamela and Sandesh.

== Sishu Rangan ==
Ghosh was a founder member and actively involved with the Sishu Rangan organisation, a voluntary body that teaches children the basics of acting, dancing and singing. It was established in 1970. He was the General Secretary of Sishu Rangan, from its foundation day to till 6 March 2016.

== Accolades ==
- Sangeet Natya Academy Award for his drama Arun Barun Kironmala in 1963.
- National award for his novel Mitul Naame Putulti (written in 1968).
- Nehru Fellowship award from "Jahar Shishu Bhavan" for his contribution in Child literature and Children Organisation
- Mouchak & Moumachi award.

== Works ==
- Arun Barun Kironmala
- Aay Brishti Rimjhim
- Alor Akashe Eagle
- Ajob Bagher Ajgubi
- Amar Naam Tayra
- Abu o Dasyu-Sardar
- Ajob Bherar Golpo
- Bon-Sabujer Dweepe
- Bajna
- Bagdoom Sing
- Bhalobasa'r chotto Harin
- Bhuter Naam Akkush
- Chotto Sonar Golpo Sona
- Dusahosi Dui Buro
- Golpo Jure Ala
- Golper Minare Pakhi
- Golpo Sangroho
- Golper Bhelki
- Huppoke Niye Gopppo
- Itimichi Saheb
- Jadur Deshe Jagannath
- Khude Nayoker Naamti Rung
- Kala Juju
- Khude Jajabor Istashi
- Kalo Ghora'r Sowar
- Kolpoloker Golpo E Noy
- Mitul Naame Putulti
- Ma,Ek Nirbhik Sainki
- Masto Golper Chotto Roshon
- Nach Re Ghora Nach
- Natun Diner Nayok
- Sona-Jhora Golper Inka
- Swapner Jadukori
- Sonalir Din
- Tora Aar Badsha
