= ABP News =

Indian news channel

- Country: India
- Broadcast area: India and International
- Headquarters: Sector 16-A, Noida, Uttar Pradesh, India

Programming
- Language: Hindi
- Picture format: 1080i HDTV (downscaled to 16:9 576i for the SDTV feed)

Ownership
- Owner: ABP Group
- Sister channels: ABP Ananda; ABP Asmita; ABP Majha; ABP Sanjha; ABP Ganga; ABP Nadu; ABP Desam

History
- Launched: 18 February 1998; 28 years ago
- Former names: Star News (1998–2012)

Links
- Webcast: ABP News
- Website: abplive.com

ABP News is an Indian free-to-air Hindi-language television news channel, owned by the ABP Group. Initially launched as Star News in 1998, it was later acquired by the ABP Group.

It had won the title of the Best Hindi-language News Channel at the 21st edition of the Indian Television Academy Awards in 2022.

== History ==
ABP News was launched as Star News on 18 February 1998 by the satellite television provider Star India in partnership with the New Delhi Television Ltd company, the latter being responsible for producing the content on the channel. Initially, a bilingual channel broadcasting in both English and Hindi, its programming turned into Hindi-only since 2003, when Star's deal with NDTV had expired.

In the same year, the Indian government had introduced a guideline limiting foreign equity in the national news business to 26%. As Star India was a wholly owned subsidiary of the former Hong Kong–based company Satellite Television Asia Region Ltd (Star TV), it enters a joint venture with the Anandabazar Patrika Group to form a new company named Media Content and Communications Services India Pvt Ltd (MCCS), which took the control of Star News's operations. The ABP held a 74% majority stake, while Star India reduced its participation with the remaining 26%.

On 16 April 2012, the ABP Group and Star India announced the end of the Star brand licensing agreement. In addition, Star sells its minority stake in MCCS to the ABP, which in turn renames the channel to ABP News. The change was also replicated on the other regional-language news channels operated by MCCS such as the Bengali-language Star Ananda and the Marathi-language Star Majha, both of which were renamed as ABP Ananda and ABP Majha, respectively. A Punjabi-language channel, ABP Sanjha was granted license approval in 2014 and launched in that year. A Gujarati-language news channel, ABP Asmita, was launched on 1 January 2016.

In November 2016, Avinash Pandey was appointed as the chief operating officer (COO) at ABP News.

All of the ABP Network's channels, along with ABP News, were gradually revamped throughout the second half of 2020 beginning with the renaming of the parent-subsidiary ABP News Network to ABP Network in July 2020. A further rebranding, which affected the channels themselves, took place on the morning of 16 December 2020 with the launch of the new digital on-screen bugs, a new brand identity and a cleaner lower-thirds package designed by the Saffron Brand Consultants for all of its channels. Additionally, ABP News had acquired new equipment to record its content at 1080i HDTV and tested its high-definition feed. Before its official launch, ABP News also had its test feed in HD around February 2020 exclusively available on the streaming service Disney+ Hotstar and its online platforms, which was in fact an upscaled feed of the SD simulcast at that time airing the 4:3 content stretched to fill the 16:9 screen. Although the ABP Network's regional channels were also rebranded, they still remain airing at the 4:3 letterboxed format with the exception of ABP Ananda, which introduced a new custom Bengali typeface while also switching to the 16:9 widescreen format on 11 December 2022.

=== Satellite interruptions during the show Masterstroke ===
In 2018, the former newscaster Punya Prasun Bajpai stated that when he had criticized the performance of one of Prime Minister Narendra Modi's projects directed towards poor farmers in his television show Masterstroke, ABP News's satellite broadcast was being disrupted, each time the programme was aired. Former employees reported that the channel owners had pressurized the host to quit the company. After his resignation, the technical issues got immediately resolved. Another host Abhisar Sharma, who challenged Modi's public-safety strategies on the channel, was also fired the same day. He had also stated that he was under pressure to leave.

== Criticism ==
The channel has been criticized for being biased and aligning with the Hindutva, the ideology of the ruling Bharatiya Janata Party (BJP) government. It has been considered to be a part of "Godi media".

== See also ==
- Mass media in India
- List of news channels in India
