= ABP Ananda =

Indian Bengali-language news channel

- Logo used since 2020
- Country: India
- Headquarters: Kolkata, West Bengal

Programming
- Language: Bengali
- Picture format: 1080i HDTV

Ownership
- Owner: ABP Group
- Sister channels: ABP News; ABP Majha; ABP Ganga; ABP Asmita; ABP Sanjha

History
- Launched: 1 June 2005; 21 years ago
- Former names: Star Ananda (2005-2012)

Links
- Website: bengali.abplive.com

ABP Ananda is a free to air Bengali news channel based in Kolkata, West Bengal owned by ABP Group. Founded on 1 June 2005 as Star Ananda, a joint venture between Star India and the ABP Group, the channel was renamed as ABP Ananda on 1 June 2012 after the ABP Group acquired full control of the organization.
