= Sananda (magazine) =

Bengali fortnightly women's magazine

- 30 September 2024 issue cover
- Company: Ananda Publishers
- Country: India
- Language: Bengali
- Website: sananda.in

Sananda (Bengali: সানন্দা) is a Bengali fortnightly women's magazine published by the ABP Group from Kolkata, India. The periodical is usually published on the 15th and 30th of every month.

== History and profile ==
Sananda started in 1986. The first issue appeared on 31 July 1986, and was an immediate success. The magazine is printed in Bengali language. Its original print run was intended to be 30,000, but the first issue sold 75,000. It was first edited by Aparna Sen. She was succeeded by Madhumita Chattopadhyay as editor-in-chief of the magazine in 2005. The same year the magazine started its Odia edition.
