= Professor Shonkur Kandokarkhana =

1970 short story collection by Satyajit Ray

- Professor Shonkur Kandokarkhana front cover
- Author: Satyajit Ray
- Illustrator: Satyajit Ray
- Language: Bengali
- Series: Professor Shanku
- Genre: Science fiction
- Publisher: Ananda Publishers
- Publication date: 1970
- Publication place: India

Professor Shonkur Kandokarkhana (Bengali: প্রফেসার শঙ্কুর কাণ্ডকারখানা; Professor Shonku's Deeds) is a Professor Shonku series book written by Satyajit Ray and published by Ananda Publishers in 1970. Ray wrote the stories about Professor Shanku for the Bengali magazines Sandesh and Anandamela. This book is a collection of five Shonku stories.

== Stories ==
- Professor Shonku o Robu (Sandesh, February and March 1968),
- Professor Shonku o Cochabambar Guha (Sandesh, May 1969),
- Professor Shonku o Raktamatsya Rahashya (Sandesh, May and June 1968),
- Professor Shanku o Gorilla (Sandesh, autumn 1969),
- Professor Shonku o Baghdader Baksho (Sandesh, March and April 1970)

== See also ==
- Punashcha Professor Shonku
- Selam Professor Shonku
