= Punashcha Professor Shonku =

- Front cover of Punashcha Professor Shonku
- Author: Satyajit Ray
- Illustrator: Satyajit Ray
- Language: Bengali
- Series: Professor Shonku
- Genre: Science fiction
- Publisher: Ananda Publishers
- Publication date: 1993
- Publication place: India

Punashcha Professor Shonku (Shonku Once Again) is a Professor Shonku series book written by Satyajit Ray and published by Ananda Publishers in 1993. Ray wrote these stories about Professor Shanku for Bengali magazines Sandesh and Anandamela. This book is a collection of five Shanku stories.

== Stories ==
- Ashcharjantu,
- Shonku o Adim Manush,
- Shonkur Porolokchorcha,
- Professor Rondir Time Machine

== See also ==
- Shabash Professor Shonku
- Professor Shonkur Kandokarkhana
