= ABP Group =

Indian media company

- Logo used since 2020
- Type: Private
- Industry: Mass media
- Founded: 13 March 1922; 104 years ago
- Founders: Praffula Kumar Sarkar
- Headquarters: Kolkata, West Bengal, India
- Key people: Dhruba Mukherjee (CEO)
- Revenue: ₹1,000 crore (US$110 million) (2024)
- Website: www.abp.in

ABP Group (Ananda Bazar Patrika) is an Indian media conglomerate headquartered in Kolkata, West Bengal. It was established in 1922.

== History ==
The company in recent years did mass layoffs at various times.

== Publishing ==
Ananda Publisher is a publisher in Bengali language. Since 1957 Ananda Publications is publishing books in Bengali Language with eminent Bengali writers like Sunil Gangopadhyay, Shirshendu Mukhopadhyay, Satyajit Ray, Saradindo Bandopadhyay, Samaresh Majumdar and more.

The Bengali series Byomkesh, Feluda and Kakababu were also published by Ananda Publications.

=== Newspapers ===
- Anandabazar Patrika – Bengali-language daily newspaper
- The Telegraph – English-language daily newspaper.

=== Magazines ===
- Anandamela
- Sananda
- Anandalok
- Desh
- Boier Desh
- The Telegraph in Schools (TTIS)

=== TV news channels ===
Channel	Language	Notes
ABP News	Hindi	Formerly Star News by Star (Disney+)
ABP Ananda	Bengali	Formerly Star Ananda by Star (Disney+)
ABP Majha	Marathi	Formerly Star Majha by Star (Disney+)
ABP Asmita	Gujarati	

=== Digital news channels ===
Channel	Language
ABP Sanjha	Punjabi
ABP Ganga	Hindi
ABP Bihar	Hindi
ABP Live	Hindi
ABP Nadu	Tamil
ABP Desam	Telugu

=== Defunct entertainment channel ===
Channel	Language	Launch	Defunct
Sananda TV	Bengali	2011	2013

== Aaro Ananda ==
Aaro Ananda
- Operating system: Android, iOS, web
- Available in: Bengali
- Type: E-reader
- Website: www.aaroananda.com

Aaro Ananda is a digital reading and audio platform developed by the group. It serves as an official digital distribution and archiving service for several Bengali literary, youth, and lifestyle publications.

Aaro Ananda distributes ABP Group's legacy and contemporary periodicals. The primary publications available on the platform include Desh, Sananda, Anandalok, Anandamela and the annual special Sharadiya Pujabarshiki.

The platform operates on a freemium model with a tiered paywall-system, offering free access and premium subscription upgrades in its articles.

Aaro Ananda features written literature and a library of audio stories, podcasts and serialized Bengali literature and classic series such as Byomkesh Bakshi series.
