= Anandamela =

Bengali Magazine

- Sharadiya 2002 front cover of Anandamela
- Editor: Sayam Bannerjee
- Former editors: Ashoke Kumar Sarkar; Nirendranath Chakravarty; Debasish Bandyopadhyay; Paulami Sengupta; Caesar Bagchi
- Frequency: Fortnightly (5th & 20th of every month)
- Publisher: Ananda Publishers (ABP Group)
- First issue: March 1975
- Country: India
- Based in: Kolkata
- Language: Bengali
- Website: www.anandamela.in

Anandamela (Bengali: আনন্দমেলা) is a children's periodical in Bengali published by the ABP Group in Kolkata, India.

== History and profile ==
The first issue of Anandamela appeared in March 1975. Satyajit Ray designed the cover of first issue. The magazine is published fortnightly. It has been edited by several eminent personalities at different times, including the poet Nirendranath Chakravarty, Ashok Kumar Sarkar, and Debasish Bandopadhyay. The current editor is Sayam Bandyopadhyay. Anandamela is one of the oldest surviving Bengali children's magazines and is published twice a month, on the fifth (previously second) and twentieth days.

Many authors began writing for children through Anandamela. For example, Shirshendu Mukhopadhyay gained recognition as a children's author after his serial novel Manojder Adbhut Baari was published in Anandamela. On 19 June 2004, Anandamela split up into two different magazines: the original Anandamela (for children aged 8 – 14) and Unish Kuri (for teens and young adults aged 15 – 25).

== Popular series, novels, and stories ==
- Aranyadeb (The Phantom) comics (translated from English)
- Archie Comics (translated from English)
- Arjun by Samaresh Majumdar
- Asterix comics written by René Goscinny and illustrated by Albert Uderzo (translated from French)
- Bagha (Tiger) comic (translated from English)
- Batman comics (translated from English)
- Chander Pahar comics by Bibhutibhusan Bandyopadhyay, with art by Sidhhartha Chaterjee
- Dodo & Tatai by Tarapada Roy
- Doohsahosi Tintin (The Adventures of Tintin) comics by Hergé (translated from French)
- Dosyi Dennis (Dennis the Menace) comics (translated from English)
- Dyuti, Hitoishi and Young Detective Kabulda by Rajesh Basu
- Ekenbabu series by Sujan Dasgupta
- Feluda comics by Satyajit Ray, art by Abhijit Chattopadhyay
- Flash Gordon comics
- Gablu (Henry) comics (translated from English)
- Ghanada by Premendra Mitra
- Gogol by Samaresh Basu
- Gupi & Panu by Leela Majumdar
- He-Man Comics (translated from English)
- Jo-Jet-Jocko (Jo, Zette and Jocko) comics by Hergé (translated from French)
- Kakababu by Sunil Gangopadhyay
- Kalaboti by Moti Nandy
- Kikira by Bimal Kar
- DiThi, Kalpyo, Srunit and Kaga, Boga by Debasis Bandyopadhyay
- Manojder Adbhut Bari, Harano Kakatua, Gosaibaganer Bhoot, and Sadhubabar Lathi (novels) by Shirshendu Mukhopadhyay
- Mitin & Tupur by Suchitra Bhattacharya
- Pandab Goenda by Sasthipada Chattopadhyay
- Professor Shonku by Satyajit Ray
- Rahasyer Sandhane, Cent Rahasya (novels), Hans-saheber Behala, Rimbor Aschorjo Putul, Nafargarer Hambir Mahal (stories) by Rajesh Basu
- Rappa Rayer Kando comics by Sujog Bondhopadhya
- Rovers-er Roy (Roy of the Rovers) comics (translated from English)
- Spider-Man comics (translated from English)
- Tarzan comics (translated from English)
- Tenida comics by Narayan Gangopadhyay, with art by Arijit Dutt Chowdhury
- Comics based on the stories by Shibram Chakraborty, with art by Saurav Mukhopadhyay
- Comics based on the stories by Parshuram (Rajshekhar Bose)

== Key writers ==
- Rajesh Basu
- Debasis Bandyopadhyay
- Samaresh Basu
- Suchitra Bhattacharya
- Dulendra Bhowmik
- Sanjeev Chattopadhyay
- Sukanto Gangopadhyay
- Sunil Gangopadhyay
- Sailen Ghosh
- Bimal Kar
- Samaresh Majumdar
- Premendra Mitra
- Shirshendu Mukhopadhyay
- Moti Nandy
- Anil Bhowmik
- Satyajit Ray
- Nabanita Dev Sen

== Key artists ==
Art and artists were always an important part of Anandamela, thus giving birth to some memorable artistic talents. Among the large number of artists who illustrated the pages and covers of Anandamela are:

- Kunal Barman
- Onkar Nath Bhattacharya
- Shubhaprasanna Bhattacharya
- Krishnendu Chaki
- Amitava Chandra
- Abhijit Chattopadhyay
- Subrata Chowdhury
- Bimal Das
- Saumen Das
- Debasish Deb
- Subrata Gangopadhyay
- Sudhir Maitra
- Roudra Mitra
- Ahibhushan Malik
- Prasenjit Nath
- Satyajit Ray
- Anup Roy
- Baishali Sarkar
- Samir Sarkar

== Special issue (Puja Number) ==
In October, the Bengali festive month, Anandamela is published in a special edition of nearly 400 pages. This edition features Sunil Gangopadhyay's new novel in the thriller series Kakababu, as well as full-length Feluda comic based on a story by Oscar-winning director Satyajit Ray, illustrated by Abhijit Chattopadhyay. The special issue includes five to six complete novels, several short stories, features, and three complete comic strips, some of which extend up to 60 pages.

Although the regular fortnightly issues of Anandamela started much later, the Puja Number began in 1971. Its price was Rs. 2.00, and it did not contain any cartoons. Sunil Gangopadhyay and Satyajit Ray are the only writers whose work has appeared in every Puja Number of Anandamela since the magazine's inception.

== Other activities ==
The Anandamela Club has a paid membership system that arranges various programs, competitions, and activities throughout the year for children.

== Criticism ==
Anandamela has faced criticism in the past for its over-reliance on foreign comics. After Paulami Sengupta took charge as the editor, original comics based on Bengali literature were introduced, and all foreign comics were pulled, including The Adventures of Tintin, which was the hallmark and flagship brand of Anandamela.

== See also ==
- Unish Kuri, sister publication of Anandamela
