= List of Edward G. Robinson performances =

This is a list of American actor Edward G. Robinson's performances.

== Film ==
Year	Title	Role	Co-stars	Notes	Ref(s)
1916	Arms and the Woman	Factory Worker		Uncredited, some sources only	
1923	The Bright Shawl	Domingo Escobar	Richard Barthelmess, Dorothy Gish, Jetta Goudal, William Powell and Mary Astor	Credited as E.G. Robinson	
1929	The Hole in the Wall	The Fox	Claudette Colbert		
1930	Outside the Law	Cobra Collins	Mary Nolan		
1930	A Lady to Love	Tony	Vilma Banky		
1930	East Is West	Charlie Yong	Lupe Vélez and Lew Ayres		
1930	Night Ride	Tony Garotta	Joseph Schildkraut and Barbara Kent		
1930	Die Sehnsucht jeder Frau	Tony		German language version of A Lady to Love	
1930	An Intimate Dinner in Celebration of Warner Brothers Silver Jubilee	Himself		Short subject	
1930	The Widow from Chicago	Dominic	Alice White and Neil Hamilton		
1931	How I Play Golf by Bobby Jones No. 10: Trouble Shots	Himself	Short subject Uncredited		
1931	Little Caesar	Little Caesar – Alias 'Rico'	Douglas Fairbanks Jr. and Glenda Farrell		
1931	The Stolen Jools	Gangster	Wallace Beery and Buster Keaton	Segment "At the Police Station"; Short subject	
1931	Smart Money	Nick Venizelos	James Cagney, Evalyn Knapp, Margaret Livingstone, and Boris Karloff		
1931	Five Star Final	Randall	H. B. Warner, Marion Marsh, and Boris Karloff		
1932	The Hatchet Man	Wong Low Get	Loretta Young		
1932	Two Seconds	John Allen	Preston Foster and Vivienne Osborne		
1932	Tiger Shark	Mike Mascarenhas	Richard Arlen and Zita Johann		
1932	Silver Dollar	Yates Martin	Bebe Daniels		
1933	The Little Giant	Bugs Ahearn	Mary Astor		
1933	I Loved a Woman	John Mansfield Hayden	Kay Francis		
1934	Dark Hazard	Jim 'Buck' Turner	Genevieve Tobin		
1934	The Man with Two Faces	Damon Welles / Jules Chautard	Mary Astor		
1935	The Whole Town's Talking	Arthur Ferguson Jones/"Killer" Mannion	Jean Arthur		
1935	Barbary Coast	Luis Chamalis	Miriam Hopkins and Joel McCrea		
1936	Bullets or Ballots	Detective Johnny Blake	Joan Blondell, Barton MacLane, and Humphrey Bogart		
1937	Thunder in the City	Dan Armstrong	Luli Deste, Nigel Bruce, Constance Collier, and Ralph Richardson		
1937	A Day at Santa Anita	Himself		Short subject Uncredited	
1937	Kid Galahad	Nick Donati	Bette Davis, Humphrey Bogart, Wayne Morris, and Jane Bryan		
1937	The Last Gangster	Joe Krozac	James Stewart and Rose Stradner		
1938	A Slight Case of Murder	Remy Marco	Jane Bryan, Allen Jenkins, and Ruth Donnelly		
1938	The Amazing Dr. Clitterhouse	Dr. Clitterhouse	Claire Trevor, Humphrey Bogart, Donald Crisp, Maxie Rosenbloom and Ward Bond		
1938	I Am the Law	Prof. John Lindsay	Barbara O'Neil, John Beal, Wendy Barrie, and Otto Kruger		
1939	Verdensberømtheder i København	Himself		Documentary	
1939	Confessions of a Nazi Spy	Edward Renard	George Sanders, Paul Lukas and Ward Bond		
1939	Blackmail	John R. Ingram	Ruth Hussey, Gene Lockhart, and Bobs Watson		
1940	Dr. Ehrlich's Magic Bullet	Dr. Paul Ehrlich	Ruth Gordon, Otto Kruger, and Donald Crisp		
1940	Brother Orchid	'Little' John T. Sarto	Ann Sothern, Humphrey Bogart, Donald Crisp, Ralph Bellamy, and Allen Jenkins		
1940	A Dispatch from Reuter's	Baron Julius Reuter	Edna Best and Eddie Albert		
1941	The Sea Wolf	'Wolf' Larsen	Ida Lupino, John Garfield, Gene Lockhart, and Barry Fitzgerald		
1941	Manpower	Hank McHenry	Marlene Dietrich, George Raft, Alan Hale Sr., Frank McHugh, and Ward Bond		
1941	Polo with the Stars	Himself – Watching Polo Match		Short subject Uncredited	
1941	Unholy Partners	Bruce Corey	Edward Arnold and Laraine Day		
1942	Larceny, Inc.	Pressure' Maxwell	Jane Wyman, Broderick Crawford, Jack Carson, Anthony Quinn, and Jackie Gleason		
1942	Tales of Manhattan	Avery L. 'Larry' Browne	Charles Boyer, Rita Hayworth, Ginger Rogers, Henry Fonda, Charles Laughton, Paul Robeson, Ethel Waters, and Eddie "Rochester" Anderson		
1942	Moscow Strikes Back	Narrator		Documentary	
1943	Magic Bullets	Narrator		Short subject Documentary	
1943	Destroyer	Steve Boleslavski	Glenn Ford, Marguerite Chapman, and Edgar Buchanan		
1943	Flesh and Fantasy	Marshall Tyler	Charles Boyer and Barbara Stanwyck	Episode 2	
1944	Tampico	Capt. Bart Manson	Lynn Bari and Victor McLaglen		
1944	Double Indemnity	Barton Keyes	Fred MacMurray and Barbara Stanwyck		
1944	Mr. Winkle Goes to War	Wilbert Winkle	Ruth Warrick, Ted Donaldson, Bob Haymes		
1944	The Woman in the Window	Professor Richard Wanley	Joan Bennett, Raymond Massey, Edmund Breon, and Dan Duryea		
1945	Our Vines Have Tender Grapes	Martinius Jacobson	Margaret O'Brien, James Craig, Frances Gifford, and Agnes Moorehead		
1945	Journey Together	Dean McWilliams	Richard Attenborough		
1945	Scarlet Street	Christopher Cross	Joan Bennett, Dan Duryea, Margaret Lindsay, and Rosalind Ivan		
1946	American Creed	Himself		Short subject	
1946	The Stranger	Mr. Wilson	Loretta Young and Orson Welles		
1947	The Red House	Pete Morgan	Lon McCallister, Judith Anderson, and Allene Roberts		
1948	All My Sons	Joe Keller	Burt Lancaster		
1948	Key Largo	Johnny Rocco	Humphrey Bogart, Lauren Bacall, Lionel Barrymore and Claire Trevor		
1948	Night Has a Thousand Eyes	John Triton	Gail Russell and John Lund		
1949	House of Strangers	Gino Monetti	Susan Hayward, Richard Conte, Luther Adler, Paul Valentine, and Efrem Zimbalist Jr.		
1949	It's a Great Feeling	Himself	Doris Day and Jack Carson	Uncredited	
1950	Operation X	George Constantin	Peggy Cummins and Richard Greene		
1952	Actors and Sin	Maurice Tillayou	Eddie Albert and Marsha Hunt	Segment: "Actor's Blood"	
1953	Vice Squad	Capt. 'Barnie' Barnaby	Paulette Goddard		
1953	Big Leaguer	John B. 'Hans' Lobert	Vera-Ellen		
1953	The Glass Web	Henry Hayes	John Forsythe, Marcia Henderson, and Kathleen Hughes		
1954	Black Tuesday	Vincent Canelli	Peter Graves and Jean Parker		
1955	The Violent Men	Lew Wilkison	Glenn Ford and Barbara Stanwyck		
1955	Tight Spot	Lloyd Hallett	Ginger Rogers and Brian Keith		
1955	A Bullet for Joey	Inspector Raoul Leduc	George Raft, Audrey Totter, George Dolenz, and Peter Van Eyck		
1955	Illegal	Victor Scott	Nina Foch, Hugh Marlowe, and Jayne Mansfield		
1956	Hell on Frisco Bay	Victor Amato	Alan Ladd and Joanne Dru		
1956	Nightmare	Rene Bressard	Kevin McCarthy, Connie Russell, and Virginia Christine		
1956	The Ten Commandments	Dathan	Charlton Heston, Yul Brynner, Anne Baxter, Yvonne De Carlo, Debra Paget, John Derek, Sir Cedric Hardwicke, and Vincent Price		
1957	The Heart of Show Business	Narrator		Short subject	
1959	A Hole in the Head	Mario Manetta	Frank Sinatra, Eleanor Parker, Carolyn Jones, Thelma Ritter, and Keenan Wynn		
1960	Seven Thieves	Theo Wilkins	Rod Steiger, Joan Collins, and Eli Wallach		
1960	Pepe	Himself	Cantinflas, Dan Dailey, and Shirley Jones		
1962	My Geisha	Sam Lewis	Shirley MacLaine, Yves Montand, and Robert Cummings		
1962	Two Weeks in Another Town	Maurice Kruger	Kirk Douglas, George Hamilton, Daliah Lavi, and Claire Trevor		
1963	Sammy Going South	Cocky Wainwright	Constance Cummings, Harry H. Corbett, Paul Stassino, and Fergus McClelland	Alternative title: A Boy Ten Feet Tall	
1963	The Prize	Dr. Max Stratman	Paul Newman and Elke Sommer		
1964	Robin and the 7 Hoods	Big Jim Stevens	Rat Pack and Bing Crosby	Uncredited	
1964	Good Neighbor Sam	Simon Nurdlinger	Jack Lemmon, Romy Schneider, and Dorothy Provine		
1964	Cheyenne Autumn	Secretary of the Interior Carl Schurz	Richard Widmark, Carroll Baker, Karl Malden, Sal Mineo, Ricardo Montalbán, Dolores del Rio, Gilbert Roland, Arthur Kennedy, and James Stewart		
1964	The Outrage	Con Man	Paul Newman, Laurence Harvey, Claire Bloom, William Shatner, and Howard Da Silva		
1965	The Cincinnati Kid	Lancey Howard	Steve McQueen, Ann-Margret, Karl Malden, Joan Blondell and Cab Calloway		
1967	All About People	Narrator		Short subject	
1967	The Blonde from Peking	Douglas – chef C.I.A.	Mireille Darc, Claudio Brook, and Giorgia Moll		
1967	Grand Slam	Prof. James Anders	Janet Leigh and Robert Hoffmann		
1967	Operation St. Peter's	Joe Ventura	Lando Buzzanca, Jean Claude Brialy,		
1968	The Biggest Bundle of Them All	Professor Samuels	Robert Wagner, Raquel Welch, Godfrey Cambridge, and Vittorio De Sica		
1968	Never a Dull Moment	Leo Joseph Smooth	Dick Van Dyke and Dorothy Provine		
1968	It's Your Move	Sir George McDowell	Adolfo Celi, Maria Grazia Buccella, Manuel Zarzo, and Terry-Thomas		
1969	Mackenna's Gold	Old Adams	Gregory Peck, Omar Sharif, and Telly Savalas		
1970	Song of Norway	Krogstad	Toralv Maurstad, Florence Henderson, Christina Schollin, Frank Poretta, Oskar Homolka, and Robert Morley		
1972	Neither by Day Nor by Night	Father	Zalman King, Miriam Bernstein-Cohen, and Dalia Friedland		
1973	Soylent Green	Sol Roth	Charlton Heston, Leigh Taylor-Young, Chuck Connors, Joseph Cotten, Brock Peters, and Paula Kelly	Posthumous release (final film role)	

== Television ==
Year(s)	Title	Role(s)	Notes	Ref(s)
1953	Lux Video Theatre	Sir Wilfred Robarts	Episode: "Witness for the Prosecution"	
1954	Climax!	Josef Vadassy	Episode: "Epitaph for a Spy"	
1955	Celebrity Playhouse	Matthew Considine	Episode: "For the Defense"	
1955	Ford Theatre	John Derwent / Baron	Episode: "... and Son"; Episode: "A Set of Values"	
1958	Playhouse 90	Oscar Bromek	Episode: "Shadows Tremble"	
1959	Goodyear Theatre	Harry Harper	Episode: "A Good Name"	
1959	Zane Grey Theatre	Victor Bers	Episode: "Heritage"	
1960	NBC Sunday Showcase	Daniel Webster	Episode: "The Devil and Daniel Webster"	
1960	The Right Man	Theodore Roosevelt	TV film	
1961	General Electric Theater	Bert Alquist	Episode: "The Drop-Out"	
1961	The Detectives	'Big Jim' Riva	Episode: "The Legend of Jim Riva"	
1962	The DuPont Show of the Week	Narrator	Episode: "Cops and Robbers"	
1965	Who Has Seen the Wind?	Captain	TV film	
1966	The Lucy Show	Edward G. Robinson	Episode: "Lucy Goes to a Hollywood Premiere"	
1967	Batman	Edward G. Robinson	Episode: "Batman's Satisfaction"	
1969	U.M.C.	Dr. Lee Forestman	Alternative title: Operation Heartbeat; TV movie	
1969–1970	Bracken's World	Edward G. Robinson / Elstyn Draper	Episode: "Panic"; Episode: "The Mary Tree"	
1970	The Old Man Who Cried Wolf	Emile Pulska	TV film	
1970	The Silent Force	Jerry	Episode: "The Courier"	
1971	Rowan & Martin's Laugh-In	Guest	Episode: "Tony Curtis, Frank Gorshin, Edward G. Robinson, Buffalo Bob Smith"	
1971	Night Gallery	Abraham Goldman	Episode: "The Messiah on Mott Street"	
1974	Mooch Goes to Hollywood	Himself – Party guest	TV film; uncredited	

== Stage ==
Opening date	Play	Role(s)	Theater	Ref(s)
April 1913	Paid in Full	Sato	Binghamton, New York	
August 12, 1915	Under Fire	André Lemaire	Hudson Theatre, New York City	
October 3, 1916	Under Sentence	Fagan	Harris Theatre, New York City	
September 8, 1917	The Pawn	Hushmaru	Fulton Theatre, New York City	
February 4, 1918	The Little Teacher	Batiste	Playhouse Theatre, New York City	
September 17, 1919	First is Last	Steve	Maxine Elliott's Theatre, New York City	
December 22, 1919	Night Lodging	Satin	Plymouth Theatre, New York City	
September 9, 1920	Poldekin	Pinsky	Park Theatre, New York City	
November 17, 1920	Samson and Delilah	The Director	Greenwich Village Theatre, New York City	
December 20, 1921	The Idle Inn	Mendel	Plymouth Theatre, New York City	
January 27, 1922	The Deluge	Nordling	Plymouth Theatre, New York City	
September 20, 1922	Banco	Louis	Ritz Theatre, New York City	
February 5, 1923	Peer Gynt	Button Moulder, Von Eberkopf	Garrick Theatre, New York City	
March 19, 1923	The Adding Machine	Shrdlu	Garrick Theatre, New York City	
October 10, 1923	Launzi	Louis	Plymouth Theatre, New York City	
November 12, 1923	A Royal Fandango	Pascual	Plymouth Theatre, New York City	
October 15, 1924	The Firebrand	Octavius	Morosco Theatre, New York City	
November 23, 1925	Androcles and the Lion	Caesar	Klaw Theatre, New York City	
November 23, 1925	The Man of Destiny	Giuseppe	Klaw Theatre, New York City	
January 25, 1926	The Goat Song	Reb Feiwell	Guild Theatre, New York City	
March 22, 1926	The Chief Thing	The Stage Director	Guild Theatre, New York City	
August 23, 1926	Henry Behave	Wescott P. Bennett	Nora Bayes Theatre, New York City	
October 11, 1926	Juarez and Maximilian	Porfirio Díaz	Guild Theatre, New York City	
November 29, 1926	Ned McCobb's Daughter	Lawyer Grover	John Golden Theatre, New York City	
January 3, 1927	The Brothers Karamazov	Smerdiakov	Guild Theatre, New York City	
March 2, 1927	Right Your Are If You Think You Are	Ponza	Guild Theatre, New York City	
November 22, 1927	The Racket	Nick Scarsi	Ambassador Theatre, New York City	
November 8, 1928	A Man with Red Hair	Mr. Crispin	Ambassador Theatre, New York City	
February 18, 1929	The Kibitzer	Lazarus	Royale Theatre, New York City	
November 10, 1930	Mr. Samuel	Samuel Brisach	Little Theatre, New York City	
September 28, 1951	Darkness at Noon	Rubashov	McCarter Theatre, Princeton, New Jersey	
February 8, 1956	Middle of the Night	The Manufacturer	ANTA Playhouse, New York City	

== Radio ==
Year	Program	Episode	Ref(s)
1938	Lux Radio Theatre	Kid Galahad	
1940	Screen Guild Theatre	Blind Alley	
1943	Lux Radio Theatre	The Maltese Falcon	
1944	Lux Radio Theatre	Destroyer	
1946	Suspense	The Man Who Wanted to Be Edward G. Robinson (The Man Who Thought He Was Edward G. Robinson)	
1946	This Is Hollywood	The Stranger	
1950	Screen Directors Playhouse	The Sea Wolf	

== Bibliography ==
- Robinson, Edward G.; Spigelgass, Leonard (1973). All My Yesterdays; an Autobiography. Hawthorn Books. LCCN 73005443.
