= Neither by Day nor by Night =

1972 film

- Directed by: Steven Hilliard Stern
- Written by: Abraham Raz, play Gisa W. Slonim, script Steven Hilliard Stern
- Produced by: Mordechai Slonim
- Starring: Zalman King; Eli Cohen
- Cinematography: Amnon Salomon
- Edited by: Alain Jakubowicz
- Music by: Vladimir Cosma
- Distributed by: Steve Broidy
- Release date: 1972
- Running time: 85 minutes
- Countries: Israel; United States
- Language: English

Neither by Day nor by Night (Hebrew: לא ביום ולא בלילה Lo B'Yom V'Lo B'Layla) is a 1972 Israeli-American drama film directed by Steven Hilliard Stern. It was entered into the 22nd Berlin International Film Festival. The film received two awards: 1) Best script, awarded by International Writer's Union, and, 2) C.I.D.A.L.C prize, for "understanding between peoples".

== Plot ==
An American solder, injured and hospitalized, is slowly going blind. He shares a hospital room with another blind person: an elderly woman who mistakes him for a man she once loved.

== Cast ==
- Haim Anitar as Akiva
- Misha Asherov as Doctor
- Miriam Bernstein-Cohen as Sokolova
- Eli Cohen as Reuven
- Dalia Friedland as Nurse
- Zvika Gold
- Zalman King as Adam
- Gita Luka
- Edward G. Robinson as Father
- David Smadar as kibbutz driver
- Mona Zilberstein as Adam's girlfriend

== See also ==
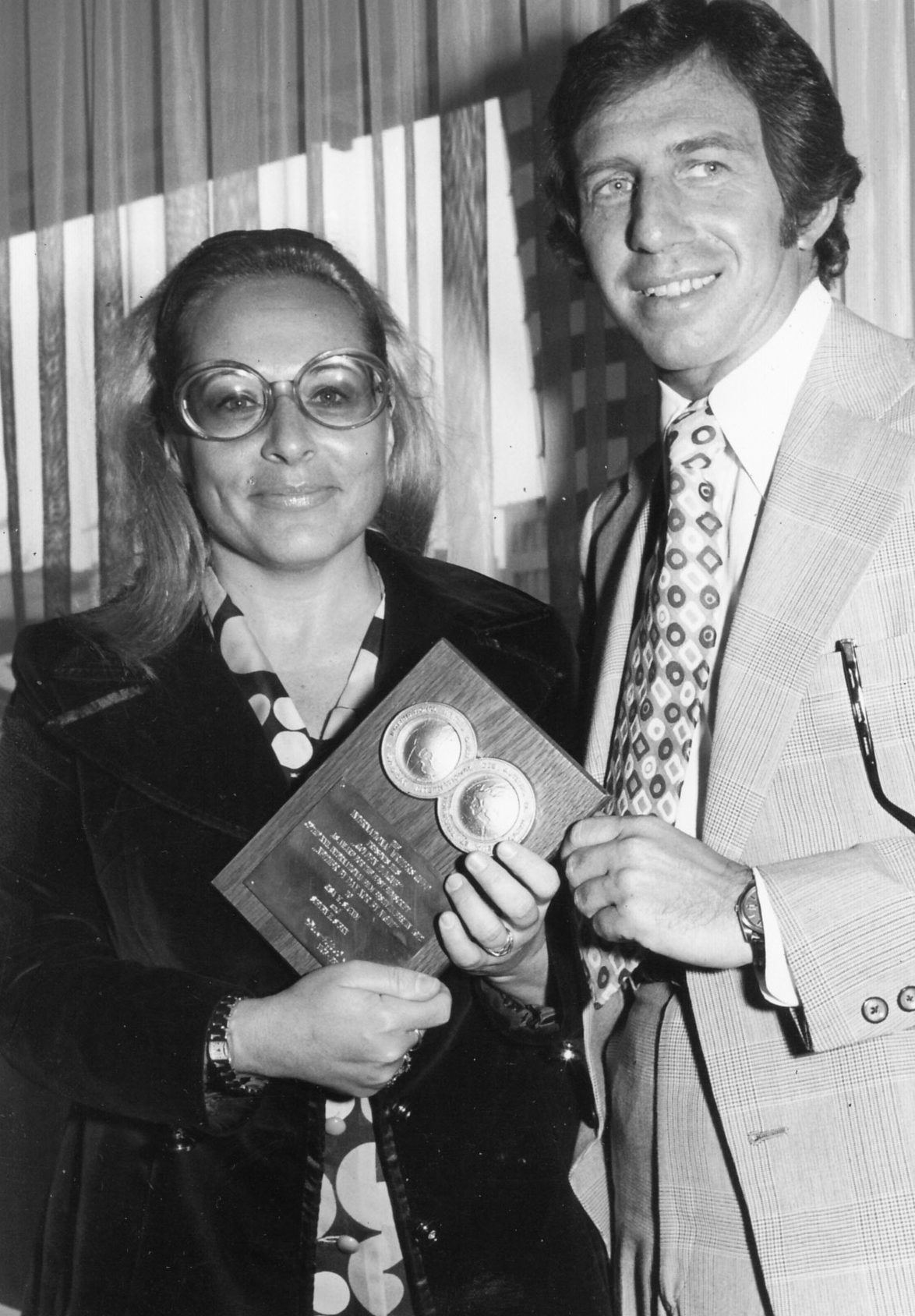
- Gisa W. Slonim and Steven H. Stern receive International Writers Guild award for ''Neither by Day nor by Night'', 1972
  List of American films of 1972
