= Angels & Demons (film) =

2009 American thriller directed by Ron Howard

- Theatrical release poster
- Directed by: Ron Howard
- Written by: David Koepp; Akiva Goldsman
- Based on: Angels & Demons by Dan Brown
- Produced by: Brian Grazer; Ron Howard; John Calley
- Starring: Tom Hanks; Ewan McGregor; Ayelet Zurer; Stellan Skarsgård; Pierfrancesco Favino; Nikolaj Lie Kaas; Armin Mueller-Stahl
- Cinematography: Salvatore Totino
- Edited by: Dan Hanley; Mike Hill
- Music by: Hans Zimmer
- Production companies: Columbia Pictures; Imagine Entertainment; Skylark Productions
- Distributed by: Sony Pictures Releasing
- Release dates: May 4, 2009 (Rome); May 15, 2009 (United States)
- Running time: 138 minutes
- Country: United States
- Language: English
- Budget: $150 million
- Box office: $485.9 million

Angels & Demons is a 2009 American mystery thriller film directed by Ron Howard and written by Akiva Goldsman and David Koepp. It is based on Dan Brown's 2000 novel of the same title. A sequel to the 2006 film The Da Vinci Code, also directed by Howard, it is the second installment in the Robert Langdon film series; however, the novel version was published before The Da Vinci Code novel.

Filming took place primarily between June and October 2008 in Rome, Italy, and the Sony Pictures Studios in Culver City, California. Tom Hanks reprises his role as Professor Robert Langdon, while Ayelet Zurer stars as Dr. Vittoria Vetra, a CERN scientist joining Langdon in the quest to recover a missing vial of antimatter from a mysterious Illuminati terrorist. Producer Brian Grazer, composer Hans Zimmer and screenwriter Akiva Goldsman also return, with Koepp coming on board to help the latter.

Angels and Demons premiered in Rome on May 4, 2009, and was released on May 15, by Sony Pictures Releasing through its Columbia Pictures label. It grossed $485.9 million worldwide against a $150 million production budget, becoming the ninth highest-grossing film of 2009, and received mixed reviews from critics, who considered it an improvement over its predecessor. A sequel, titled Inferno, concluded the series in 2016.

== Plot ==
Mourning Pope Pius XVI's sudden death, the Catholic Church prepares the papal conclave to elect his successor. Fr. Patrick McKenna, the Camerlengo, temporarily controls the Vatican during the sede vacante.

Meanwhile, at CERN, scientists Fr. Silvano Bentivoglio and Dr. Vittoria Vetra create three antimatter canisters. Checking on them, Vetra finds Bentivoglio murdered and one canister gone. Shortly thereafter, four preferiti are kidnapped by a supposed Illuminati representative. The Vatican discovers one cardinal will die each hour, from 8 p.m. to midnight, when the antimatter explodes, destroying the city.

Claudio Vicenzi recruits American symbologist Professor Robert Langdon to help, for his experience with the Priory of Sion in Paris and London. (Note: As depicted in The Da Vinci Code (2006)) He deduces the four murders will occur on the four altars of the "Path of Illumination", relevant to the classical elements. Langdon is granted access to the Vatican Secret Archive (Note: Its name was Vatican Secret Archive until October 2019, 10 years after this film was released, when Pope Francis issued a motu proprio changing the name to Vatican Apostolic Archive.) to research the altars, against the head of the Swiss Guard Commander Richter's wishes.

Galileo's banned book gives clues to the first altar. Initially believing it is the Pantheon, they realise it is the Chigi Chapel. Richter dismissively abandons them, but two Vatican City police officers rush them there. Too late, Cardinal Ebner has suffocated through a mouth full of dirt, and is branded with "Earth".

A clue at the Chigi Chapel's Bernini statue leads Langdon to the next altar, another sculpture in St. Peter's Square. Again arriving late, Cardinal Lamassé's lungs are punctured and he is branded with "Air". A note left makes Vetra suspect Pius XVI's "stroke" was actually a tinzaparin overdose, which they confirm after secretly inspecting his body in the necropolis.

Langdon and the officers hurry to the altar of fire, the Santa Maria della Vittoria. Cardinal Guidera has been burned to death, branded with "Fire". The assassin then kills all but Langdon before escaping.

The final altar is Piazza Navona's Four Rivers sculpture. The incompetent Richter demands Langdon return to the Vatican, but he and two policemen catch the assassin drowning Cardinal Baggia, who is branded with "Water", in a fountain. He kills the officers and escapes, but Langdon and bystanders rescue Baggia. He reveals the preferiti were held in Castel Sant'Angelo.

When Richter confiscates Dr. Silvano's journals, Vetra believes he is involved. She and Langdon storm Castel Sant'Angelo, the assassin's lair, find the four brands, and deduce a missing fifth one is meant for McKenna. The assassin confronts them, but leaves them both unharmed. He insists clergy hired him, suggesting they "be careful".

The assassin's anonymous contact guides him to a bomb-rigged escape car. Langdon and Vetra find a secret passageway to the Vatican, warning the Swiss Guard of McKenna's fate. They find Richter hovering over a branded McKenna. The Swiss Guard shoot and kill him and alleged co-conspirator Archbishop Simeon. Langdon retrieves a key from the dying Richter's hand.

The antimatter container is found in Saint Peter's tomb, set to detonate in five minutes. As the cold temperature has prematurely drained the battery keeping the antimatter in suspension, it will not reach midnight. So, former helicopter pilot McKenna flies the canister into the sky, parachuting out seconds before the antimatter detonates. This unleashes a powerful, blinding shockwave throughout Vatican City, but no one dies and the Church is saved. Hailed a hero, there are calls to elect him pope by acclamation.

Langdon and Vetra discover Silvano's journals reference hidden security cameras monitoring the Pope for medical reasons. With Richter's key, they find footage showing McKenna masterminded the attacks. He orchestrated Pius XVI's death, as the latter wanted the antimatter to be publicly presented as proof of a divine power using science. Considering this blasphemy, McKenna hired the assassin to get him elected pope, making the Illuminati the scapegoat. When the conclave sees the evidence, McKenna immolates himself to avoid arrest.

Cardinal Baggia becomes pope. He takes the name Pope Luke, as the biblical Luke was both a doctor and apostle – symbolically bridging the gap between science and religion. The Vatican hides McKenna's treachery by announcing parachute landing injury complications killed him, leading to calls for sainthood. Cardinal Strauss, the Pope's new camerlengo, loans Galileo's book to Langdon in thanks, requesting its return upon his death. Pope Luke thankfully nods to Langdon and Vetra before greeting the masses with the traditional first Urbi et Orbi.

== Cast ==
- Tom Hanks as Robert Langdon, a Harvard University professor of symbology.
- Ewan McGregor as Fr. Patrick McKenna, the Camerlengo.
- Ayelet Zurer as Dr. Vittoria Vetra, a CERN scientist whose antimatter experiment has allegedly been stolen by the Illuminati.
- Stellan Skarsgård as Commander Maximilian Richter, head of the Swiss Guard.
- Pierfrancesco Favino as Inspector General Ernesto Olivetti of the Gendarme Corps of Vatican City State.
- Nikolaj Lie Kaas as the assassin.
- Armin Mueller-Stahl as Cardinal Strauss, Dean of the College of Cardinals and the papal conclave.
- Thure Lindhardt as Lieutenant Chartrand, officer of the Swiss Guard.
- David Pasquesi as Claudio Vincenzi, a Vatican police officer sent to summon Langdon.
- Cosimo Fusco as Archbishop Simeon, prefect of the papal household.
- Victor Alfieri as Lieutenant Valenti, a Carabinieri officer who takes Langdon to the Fountain of the Four Rivers.
- Carmen Argenziano as Fr. Silvano Bentivoglio, a Catholic priest and a CERN scientist who performed the antimatter experiment along with Dr. Vetra.
- Marc Fiorini as Cardinal Baggia, one of the four preferiti and a cardinal from Milan, Italy and the favorite to succeed as the new pope; he later becomes Pope Luke.
- Bob Yerkes as Cardinal Guidera, one of the four preferiti and a cardinal from Barcelona, Spain.
- Franklin Amobi as Cardinal Lamassé, one of the four preferiti and a cardinal from Paris, France.
- Curt Lowens as Cardinal Ebner, one of the four preferiti and a cardinal from Frankfurt, Germany.
- Todd Schneider as a Carabiniere, Lieutenant Valenti's partner who along with him takes Langdon to the Fountain of the Four Rivers.
- Anna Katarina as a docent, the Pantheon tour guide who tells Langdon the name of the first church.
- Howard Mungo as Cardinal Yoruba
- Rance Howard as Cardinal Beck
- Steve Franken as Cardinal Colbert
- Gino Conforti as Cardinal Pugini
- Elya Baskin as Cardinal Petrov
- August Wittgenstein as a Swiss Guard

== Production ==
=== Development ===
In 2003, Sony Pictures acquired the film rights to Angels & Demons along with The Da Vinci Code in a deal with author Dan Brown. In May 2006, following the release of the 2006 film adaptation of The Da Vinci Code, Sony Pictures hired screenwriter Akiva Goldsman, who wrote the film adaptation of The Da Vinci Code, to adapt Angels & Demons. Filming was originally to begin in February 2008 and it was originally going to be released on December 19, 2008; because of the 2007–2008 Writers Guild of America strike, the film was pushed back for May 15, 2009. David Koepp rewrote the script before shooting began.

Director Ron Howard chose to treat Angels & Demons as a sequel to the previous film, rather than a prequel, since many had read the novel after The Da Vinci Code. He liked the idea that Langdon had been through one adventure and become a more confident character. Howard was also more comfortable taking liberties in adapting the story because this novel was less popular than The Da Vinci Code. Producer Brian Grazer said they were too "reverential" when adapting The Da Vinci Code, which resulted in it being "a little long and stagey". This time, "Langdon doesn't stop and give a speech. When he speaks, he's in motion." Howard concurred "it's very much about modernity clashing with antiquity and technology vs. faith, so these themes, these ideas are much more active whereas the other one lived so much in the past. The tones are just innately so different between the two stories."

=== Differences between novel and film ===
- In the novel, the papal conclave attracts relatively little public attention. In the wake of the huge international interest in the 2005 election of Pope Benedict XVI, this was judged to be out of date.
- The character of CERN Director Maximillian Kohler does not appear in the film.
- The Italian Camerlengo Carlo Ventresca is changed to the Irish Patrick McKenna, portrayed by Ewan McGregor.
- The Lockheed Martin X-33 that takes Langdon from the United States to Geneva and then to Rome is absent in the film.
- Langdon's visit to CERN is absent in the film.
- In the novel, Commander Olivetti is the commander of Swiss Guard, and his second in command is Captain Rocher, whereas in the film, Rocher (changed to Richter) is the head of the Swiss Guard.
- In the novel, the assassin contacts members of the BBC in order to influence how they present the story of his activities, but this does not happen in the film.
- The character Leonardo Vetra is named Silvano Bentivoglio in the film, is not related to Vittoria, and his death scene is changed.
- Vittoria is a love interest for Langdon in the novel while there is no attraction present in the film.
- In the novel, Camerlengo Carlo Ventresca is revealed to be the late pope's biological son while in the film he is his adoptive son.
- In the film, the Camerlengo briefly acknowledges Langdon's involvement in some events of the previous film when in the book it does not, as the events in The Da Vinci Code are yet to take place. This is due to the fact that The Da Vinci Code was adapted to film before Angels & Demons.
- In the book, the assassin has Middle Eastern looks whereas in the film he is portrayed by a Danish actor. In the film, he is killed by a car bomb whereas in the book he falls from a balcony at the top of the Castel Sant'Angelo. He consequently breaks his back on a pile of marble cannonballs, an injury which eventually kills him.
- In the novel, Vittoria is kidnapped whereas in the film she joins Langdon almost everywhere.
- In the book, all four preferiti are killed by the assassin and eventually the high elector, Cardinal Saverio Mortati, is elected as the new pope whereas in the film, the fourth preferito, Cardinal Baggia, is saved by Langdon and is elected the new pope. The high elector, renamed Cardinal Strauss, becomes the camerlengo to the new pope.
- In the book, the fifth brand is one that incorporates all four words from the previous four whereas in the film the fifth brand is the crossed keys, symbolic of the papacy.
- The means by which the heroes discover the location of the bomb is significantly different. In the book, the Camerlengo feigns a religious vision from God, telling him where to find the bomb. In the film, he feeds Langdon a clue to the bomb's location by branding himself with an upside-down version of the papal keys, which Langdon successfully deduces is a metaphor for Saint Peter, the first pope, who was crucified upside-down.
- In the book, Langdon stows away on the Camerlengo's helicopter, and just before the antimatter explosion, jumps out using a makeshift parachute, and lands on Isola Tiberina, whose mythical healing powers heal the injuries he incurs from the fall. In the film, Langdon does not get on the helicopter.
- In the book's closing scenes, a Swiss Guard hands Langdon the fifth brand, the Illuminati diamond, as a gift. In the film, the new Camerlengo hands over Galileo's book to Langdon.

=== Filming ===
Shooting began on June 4, 2008, in Rome under the fake working title Obelisk. The filmmakers scheduled three weeks of exterior location filming because of a predicted 2008 Screen Actors Guild strike on June 30. The rest of the film would be shot at Sony Pictures Studios in Culver City, California, to allow for this halt. Roman Catholic Church officials found The Da Vinci Code offensive and forbade filming in their churches, so these scenes were shot at Sony. The Caserta Palace doubled for the inside of the Vatican, and the Biblioteca Angelica was used for the Vatican Library. Filming took place at the University of California, Los Angeles in July. Sony and Imagine Entertainment organized an eco-friendly shoot, selecting when to shoot locations based on how much time and fuel it would save, using cargo containers to support set walls or greenscreens, as well as storing props for future productions or donating them to charity.

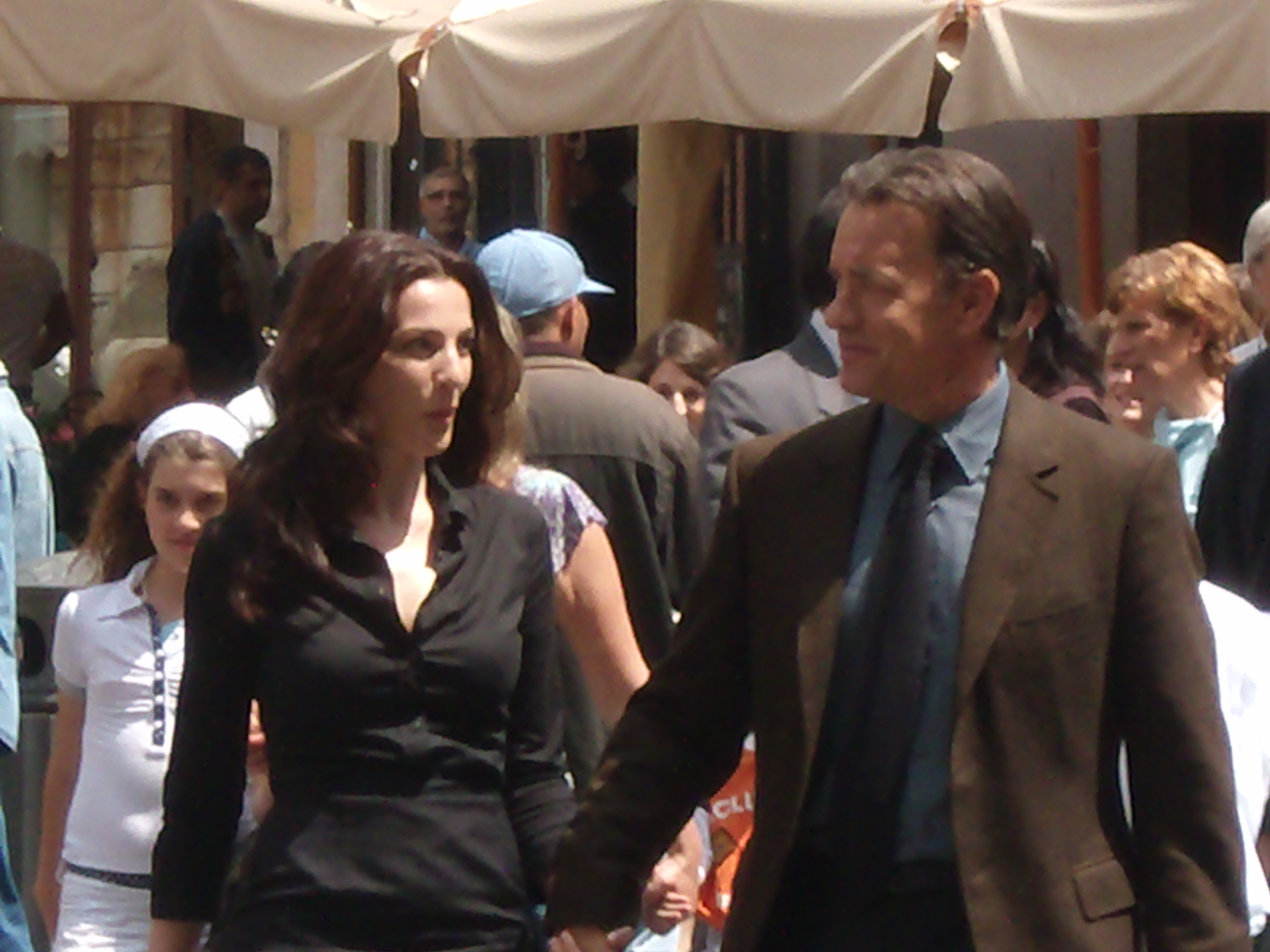
Ayelet Zurer and Tom Hanks outside the Pantheon

Howard hated that the Writers Guild strike forced him to delay shooting the film until summer. However, the quick shoot allowed him to refine the naturalism he had employed on his previous film Frost/Nixon, often using handheld cameras to lend an additional energy to the scenes. Hanks interrupted filming of one scene in order to help Australian bride Natalia Dearnley get through the crowds to her wedding on time. McGregor said the Pope's funeral was the dullest sequence to film, as they were just walking across staircases. Then, "Someone started singing 'Bohemian Rhapsody' [and] it became the funeral theme tune."

When recreating the interior of St. Peter's Basilica, production designer Allan Cameron and visual effects supervisor Angus Bickerton recognized the 80 ft (24 m) tall soundstages were only half the size of the real church. They rebuilt the area around and the crypts beneath St. Peter's Baldachin, including the bottoms of the columns and Saint Peter's statue, and surrounded it with a 360 degree greenscreen so the rest could be built digitally. Cameron had twenty crew members, posing as members of the public, photograph as much as they could inside the Sistine Chapel, and had artists sketch, photograph and enlarge recreations of the paintings and mosaics from the photographs. Cameron chose to present the Sistine Chapel as it was before the restoration of its frescoes, as he preferred the contrast which the formerly smoky, muted colors would present against the vivid red of the cardinal's vestments. Although the chapel was built to full size, the Sala Regia was made smaller to fit inside the stage.

The Saint Peter's Square and the Piazza Navona sets were built on the same backlot; after completion of scenes at the former, six weeks were spent converting the set, knocking down the Basilica side and excavating 3 1/2 ft (1 m) of tarmac to build the fountain. As there had been filming at the real Piazza Navona, the transition between it and the replica had to be seamless. To present the Santa Maria del Popolo undergoing renovation, a police station in Rome opposite the real church was used for the exterior; the scaffolding would hide that it was not the church. Cameron built the interior of Santa Maria del Popolo on the same set as the recreated Santa Maria della Vittoria to save money; the scaffolding also disguised this. The film's version of Santa Maria della Vittoria was larger than the real one, so it would accommodate the cranes used to film the scene. To film the Pantheon's interior, two aediculae and the tomb of Raphael were rebuilt to scale at a height of 30 ft (9 m), while the rest was greenscreen. Because of the building's symmetrical layout, the filmmakers were able to shoot the whole scene over two days and redress the real side to pretend it was another. The second unit took photographs of the Large Hadron Collider and pasted these in scenes set at CERN.

== Music ==
Hans Zimmer returned to compose the score for the sequel. He chose to develop the "Chevaliers de Sangreal" track from the end of The Da Vinci Code as Langdon's main theme in the film, featuring prominently in the tracks "God Particle" and "503". The soundtrack also features violinist Joshua Bell.

== Home media and different versions ==
The DVD was released on November 24, 2009, in several countries as a theatrical version and extended cut.

Angels & Demons was also released on Universal Media Disc for the Sony PlayStation Portable on October 21, 2009.

The extended cut includes violent scenes which had been cut out to secure a PG-13 rating. In the UK, the already censored US theatrical version had to be censored further in order to obtain a BBFC 12A rating. The Blu-ray includes the original theatrical version and is classified BBFC 15.

A 4K Ultra HD Blu-ray was released on October 11, 2016.

Angels & Demons is available for rent/purchase on Apple TV, Prime Video, and Fandango at Home.

== Reception ==
=== Box office ===
Overseas, Angels & Demons maintained the #1 position for the second weekend as well even with the release of Night at the Museum: Battle of the Smithsonian, which opened at #2. The film opened with $46 million at the US and Canada box office. The Da Vinci Code had opened in the US and Canada to $77.1 million, but the sequel's opening met Columbia's $40–50 million prediction, since the film's source material was not as popular as its predecessor's. Within more than a month, the film grossed $478,869,160 worldwide, making it the largest-grossing film of 2009 until it was surpassed by Transformers: Revenge of the Fallen. Of this $478 million, just over 27% of it is from venues in the US and Canada, giving the film high worldwide totals, with over $30 million in the UK, $21 million in Spain, $13 million in Brazil, $13 million in Russia, $34 million in Japan, and $47 million in Germany. Angels & Demons was the ninth-highest-grossing film of 2009, with box-office figures of $485,930,810 worldwide.

=== Critical response ===
Review aggregation website Rotten Tomatoes reports that 36% of 256 critics have given the film a positive review, with an average rating of 5.10/10. The site's consensus is that "Angels & Demons is a fast-paced thrill ride, and an improvement on the last Dan Brown adaptation, but the storyline too often wavers between implausible and ridiculous, and does not translate effectively to the big screen." Metacritic has a rating score of 48 out of 100 based on 36 reviews, indicating "mixed or average" reviews. Audiences polled by CinemaScore gave the film an average grade of "B+" on an A+ to F scale. BBC critic Mark Kermode criticized the film's "silliness", saying "Whereas the original movie featured Hanks standing around in darkened rooms explaining the plot to anyone who was still awake, this second salvo cranks up the action by having Tom explain the plot while running—a major breakthrough."

Richard Corliss of Time gave the film a positive review, stating that "Angels & Demons has elemental satisfactions in its blend of movie genre that could appeal to wide segments of the audience." Roger Ebert of the Chicago Sun-Times awarded the film three stars out of four, the same score he had given the previous film, and praised Howard's direction as an "even-handed job of balancing the scales" and concluding "[the film] promises to entertain." The Christian Science Monitor gave the film a positive review, claiming the film is "an OK action film." Peter Travers of Rolling Stone gave the film two-and-a-half out of four stars, writing that "the movie can be enjoyed for the hell-raising hooey it is." Joe Morgenstern of The Wall Street Journal wrote that it "manages to keep you partially engaged even at its most esoteric or absurd."

Neil Smith from Total Film gave the film four out of five stars, saying "some of the author's crazier embellishments are jettisoned in a film that atones for The Da Vinci Code's cardinal sin—thou shalt not bore." Kim Newman awarded it three out of five stars, stating "every supporting character acts like an unhelpful idiot to keep the plot stirring, while yet again a seemingly all-powerful conspiracy seems to consist of two whole evil guys."

=== Catholic Church response ===
CBS News interviewed a priest working in Santa Susanna, who stated the Catholic Church did not want their churches to be associated with scenes of murder. A tour guide also stated that most priests do not object to tourists who visit out of interest after reading the book, a trend which will continue after people see the film. "I think they are aware that it's ... a work of fiction and that it's bringing people into their churches." Producer Brian Grazer deemed it odd that although The Da Vinci Code was a more controversial novel, they had more freedom shooting its film adaptation in the authentic locations of London and France. Italian authorities hoped the filmmakers corrected the location errors in the novel, to limit the amount of explaining they will have to do for confused tourists.

William A. Donohue, president of the Catholic League, did not call for a boycott, but requested that Catholics inform others about anti-Catholic sentiments in the story. "My goal ... is to give the public a big FYI: Enjoy the movie, but know that it is a fable. It is based on malicious myths, intentionally advanced by Ron Howard." A Sony executive responded that they were disappointed Donohue had not created attention for the film closer to its release date. Howard criticized Donohue for prejudging the film, responding that it could not be called anti-Catholic since Langdon protects the Church, and because of its depiction of priests who support science.

The official Vatican newspaper L'Osservatore Romano called the film "harmless entertainment", giving it a positive review and acknowledging that "the theme is always the same: a sect versus the Church, [but] this time, the Church is on the side of the good guys." Beforehand, it had stated it would not approve the film, while La Stampa reported the Vatican would boycott it. However, it also quoted Archbishop Velasio De Paolis as saying a boycott would probably just have the "Streisand effect" of drawing more attention to Angels & Demons and making it more popular. Eventually no boycott was declared and the Vatican stayed officially silent about the film, unlike its condemnation of The Da Vinci Code.

==== Banned in Samoa ====
In Samoa, the film was banned by film censor Lei'ataua Olo'apu. Olo'apu stated that he was banning the film because it was "critical of the Catholic Church" and so as to "avoid any religious discrimination by other denominations and faiths against the Church." The Samoa Observer remarked that Olo'apu himself is Catholic. The Censorship Board had previously banned the film The Da Vinci Code for being "contradictory to Christian beliefs."

=== CERN response ===
In response to the portrayal of CERN and the work performed by CERN, and antimatter, CERN set up a website to explain what it does and what antimatter is.

== Accolades ==
Award	Category	Recipient(s) and nominee(s)	Result
2009 Teen Choice Awards	Choice Movie: Drama	Angels & Demons	Nominated
2009 Teen Choice Awards	Choice Summer Movie: Drama	Angels & Demons	Nominated
8th Visual Effects Society Awards	Outstanding Supporting Visual Effects in a Feature Motion Picture	Barrie Hemsley, Angus Bickerton, Ryan Cook, Mark Breakspear	Nominated

== Sequel ==
Sony Pictures produced a film adaptation of Inferno, the fourth book in the Robert Langdon series, which was released on October 14, 2016, with Ron Howard as director, David Koepp adapting the screenplay, Tom Hanks reprising his role as Robert Langdon, and co-starring Felicity Jones, Ben Foster, Irrfan Khan and Sidse Babett Knudsen.

== See also ==
- Draper–White thesis
- Particle accelerators in popular culture
- Robert Langdon film series
