= Forest City Baptist Church =

Historic church in North Carolina, United States

- U.S. National Register of Historic Places
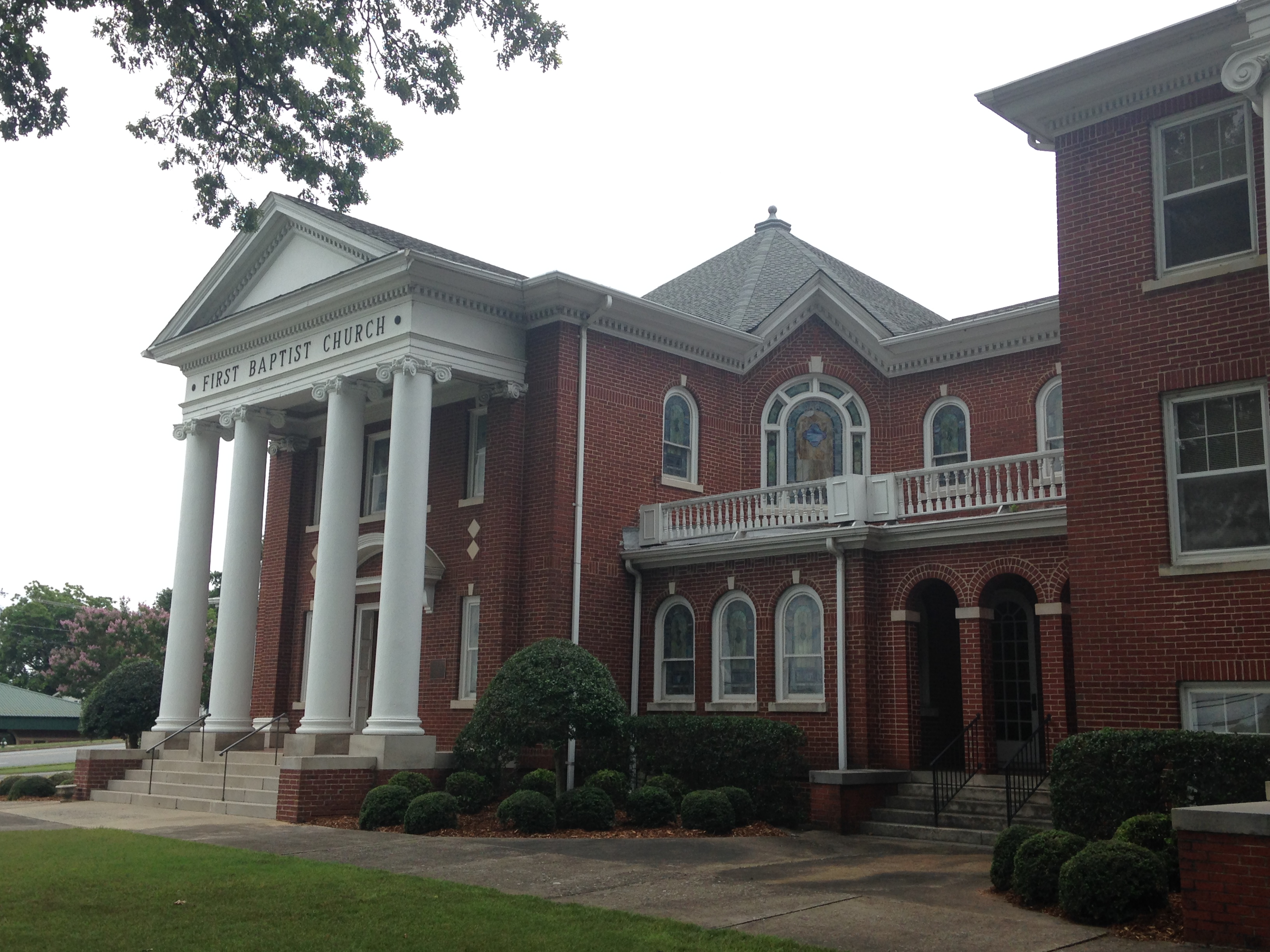

- Location within North Carolina Location within the United States
- Location: 301 W. Main St., Forest City, North Carolina
- Coordinates: 35°20′3″N 81°52′9″W
- Area: 1.7 acres (0.69 ha)
- Built: 1915
- Architect: McMichael, James M.; Et al.
- Architectural style: Classical Revival
- NRHP reference No.: 89001417
- Added to NRHP: September 14, 1989

Forest City Baptist Church, also known as First Baptist Church, is a historic Baptist church building located at 301 W. Main Street in Forest City, Rutherford County, North Carolina. It was designed by architect James M. McMichael and built in 1915. It is a two-story, cruciform plan, Classical Revival-style brick building. It consists of an octagonal core surmounted by an eight-sided, slate-covered, pyramidal roof from which rectangular pedimented-gable wings project on the four sides. Adjoining the church is the Alexander Memorial building, built in 1927.

It was added to the National Register of Historic Places in 1989.
