= Rachel Attas =

Israeli actress (1934–2004)

- רחל אטאס
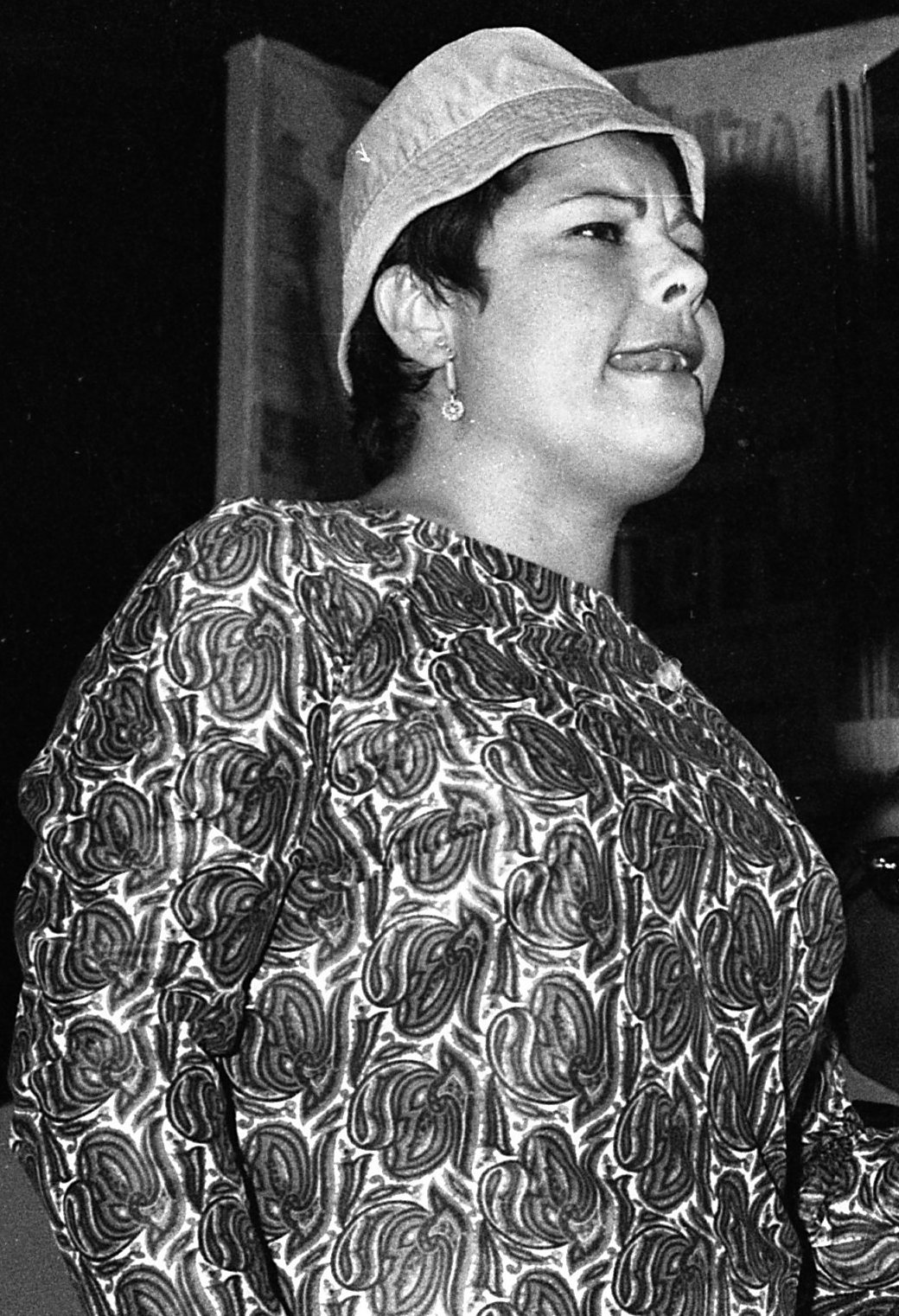
- Attas in 1969
- Born: 24 July 1934; Tel Aviv, Mandatory Palestine
- Died: 25 November 2004 (aged 70); Petah Tikva, Israel
- Other names: Rachel Attas-Baruch
- Occupations: Actress; singer
- Years active: 1950–2004
- Spouse: David Baruch (m. 1953)
- Children: 3

Rachel Attas (Hebrew: רחל אטאס; 24 July 1934 – 25 November 2004) was an Israeli actress, voice artist, and singer.

== Biography ==
Attas was born in Tel Aviv, the first of five children. Her father emigrated from Thessaloniki while her mother was a Mizrahi Jew. Before her career began she showed a talent for acting and singing and at the age of 16, she made her first stage performance. One of her earliest performances took place in the Habima Theatre in 1953. She starred in a theatre adaption of Cry, the Beloved Country. She was also a member of a satire theatre group which was active during the late 1950s.

Attas also performed many songs which then became hits across Israel and she also sung in plays and television. Her most popular television performance was on the 1970s television show Ha'Yladim Mi'Shchunat Chaim which aired on Israeli Educational Television. She also starred in the film Impossible on Saturday (1965) as well as 5 and 5 (1980).

Attas received local and international attention dubbing animated characters into the Hebrew language. She most notably dubbed characters that originated from the Disney Renaissance period. These include Mrs. Potts from Beauty and the Beast, Ursula from The Little Mermaid, Big Mama from The Fox and the Hound and the Queen of Hearts in Alice in Wonderland.

=== Personal life ===
Attas was married to actor and director David Baruch from 1953 until her death in 2004. They had three children together and five grandchildren.

== Death ==
Attas died of cancer in Petah Tikva on 25 November 2004 at the age of 70. She was buried at the cemetery in Pardes Hanna-Karkur.
