= James M. McMichael =

American architect

James Mackson McMichael (December 14, 1870 – October 3, 1944), known as James M. McMichael, was an American architect. Several buildings he designed are listed on the National Register of Historic Places.

McMichael worked out of Charlotte and was known for his church domed, classically detailed, church designs for Baptist and Protestant congregations. He also designed theaters, lodges, courthouses, stores, hotels, and residences.

Early in his career, he worked at Wheeler, McMichael, and Company (1901–1902) and McMichael and Hunter (1903–1904). During most of his career, he ran his own firm.

McMicahel was born in Harrisburg, Pennsylvania to James and Lavinia (Venia) McMichael and had at least four siblings. He married Sarah Florence Williamson on October 23, 1896 in Chester, Pennsylvania, where they lived in 1900. He moved to Charlotte in 1901 and was associated with architect Oliver Duke Wheeler. He may have replaced Louis E. Schwend who died in 1900. In 1903, McMichael and architect Leonard L. Hunter formed the firm of McMichael and Hunter which lasted through 1904. They designed two schools, two houses, a courthouse, a lodge, an office building, and seven churches.

McMichael established his own firm in 1904. By 1915 or 1916, the busy practice hired Marion R. Marsh. Like architect C. C. Hook of Charlotte, he favored Colonial architecture designs. He also designed Gothic Revival architecture churches, including First Baptist Church (1922–1924) in Concord, Myers Park Presbyterian Church (1927) He designed the First Baptist Church in Charlotte in a Byzantine architecture style. Many of his church designs are domed. Other churches he designed include the Page Memorial Methodist Church (1913) in Aberdeen, East Avenue Tabernacle Associate Reformed Presbyterian Church (1914) in Charlotte, Edenton Baptist Church (1916–1920) in Edenton, First Baptist Church (1922) in Lincolnton, Edenton Baptist Church, and Charlotte's Little Rock A. M. E. Zion Church (1908–1911).

McMichael and his wife had three sons and five daughters. According to his obituary, he designed more than 900 churches in his 50-year career.

== Work ==
- East Avenue Tabernacle Associate Reformed Presbyterian Church, 927 Elizabeth St., Charlotte, North Carolina (McMichael, James Mackson), NRHP-listed
- First Baptist Church (Lincolnton, North Carolina), 403 E. Main St., Lincolnton, North Carolina (McMichael, James M.), NRHP-listed
- Forest City Baptist Church, 301 W. Main St., Forest City, North Carolina (McMichael, James M.), NRHP-listed
- Leroy Springs House, Catawba and Gay Sts., Lancaster, South Carolina (McMichael, James M.), NRHP-listed
- St. John's Baptist Church, 300 Hawthorne Ln., Charlotte, North Carolina, contributing structure to Elizabeth Historic District, NRHP-listed
- One or more works in Belmont Historic District, roughly bounded by Sacred Heart College campus, RR line, N. and S. Main, Glenway, Bryant Sts., Keener Blvd., Central Ave, Belmont, North Carolina (McMichael, J.M.), NRHP-listed
- One or more works in Downtown Wilkesboro Historic District, bounded roughly by Cowles and Corporation Sts., Henderson Dr., and Woodland Blvd., Wilkesboro, North Carolina (Wheeler, McMichael and Co.), NRHP-listed

== See also ==
- Marion Marsh
