= Hide Away (film) =

2011 film directed by Chris Eyre

- Film poster
- Directed by: Chris Eyre
- Written by: Peter Vanderwall
- Produced by: Josh Lucas; Sally Jo Effenson; Kevin Reidy
- Starring: Josh Lucas; Ayelet Zurer; Jon Tenney; Taylor Nichols; James Cromwell
- Cinematography: Elliot Davis
- Edited by: Devin Maurer; Jonathan Lucas
- Music by: Tony Morales; Edward Rogers
- Production company: MMC Joule Films
- Release dates: March 12, 2011 (SXSW); May 25, 2012 (United States)
- Running time: 88 minutes
- Country: United States
- Language: English
- Box office: $30,655

Hide Away, also known as A Year in Mooring, is a 2011 American psychological drama film directed by Chris Eyre. It stars Josh Lucas as a successful businessman attempting to resurrect his life, with Ayelet Zurer, Jon Tenney, Taylor Nichols, and James Cromwell in supporting roles.

The film had its world premiere at the South by Southwest Film Festival on March 12, 2011. It received a limited theatrical release in the United States on May 25, 2012.

== Cast ==
- Josh Lucas as The Young Mariner
- Ayelet Zurer as The Waitress
- James Cromwell as The Ancient Mariner
- Jon Tenney as The Divorced Man
- Taylor Nichols as The Boss
- Casey LaBow as Lauren
- Anne Faba as Helen
- Austin Bickel as Owen
- Ele Bardha as The Buyer
- David Herbst as The Seller
- Bryan Crough as The Curmudgeon
- Taylor Groothuis as Young Lauren

== Reception ==
=== Critical response ===
On review aggregator website Rotten Tomatoes, Hide Away holds an approval rating of 46% based on 13 reviews. On Metacritic, it has a weighted average score of 34 out of 100, based on 9 critics, indicating "generally unfavorable" reviews.

Joe Leydon of Variety wrote that the film "sails smoothly, if not downright defiantly, far beyond the commercial mainstream". The Hollywood Reporter staff stated that it "offers an unconvincing tale of spiritual recovery" and "expects viewers to come along for the weepy ride but gives us no reason to care about its hero's pain or to cheer his inarticulate path out of it".

Drew Taylor of IndieWire called it "a truly lousy movie that does everything it can to suffocate Lucas' very fine performance".

Sheri Linden of the Los Angeles Times concluded her review saying director Chris Eyre "conveys a strong sense of place and of solitude, but can't replenish the story's shallows". Stephen Holden of The New York Times described the film as "a ponderous piece of allegorical kitsch about grief and healing".

=== Awards and nominations ===
Year	Festival	Category	Recipient	Result	Ref.
2011	South by Southwest Film Festival	Narrative Feature Competition – Grand Jury	Chris Eyre	Nominated	
2011	South by Southwest Film Festival	Narrative Feature Competition – Best Cinematography	Elliot Davis	Won	
