= Inyan Shel Zman =

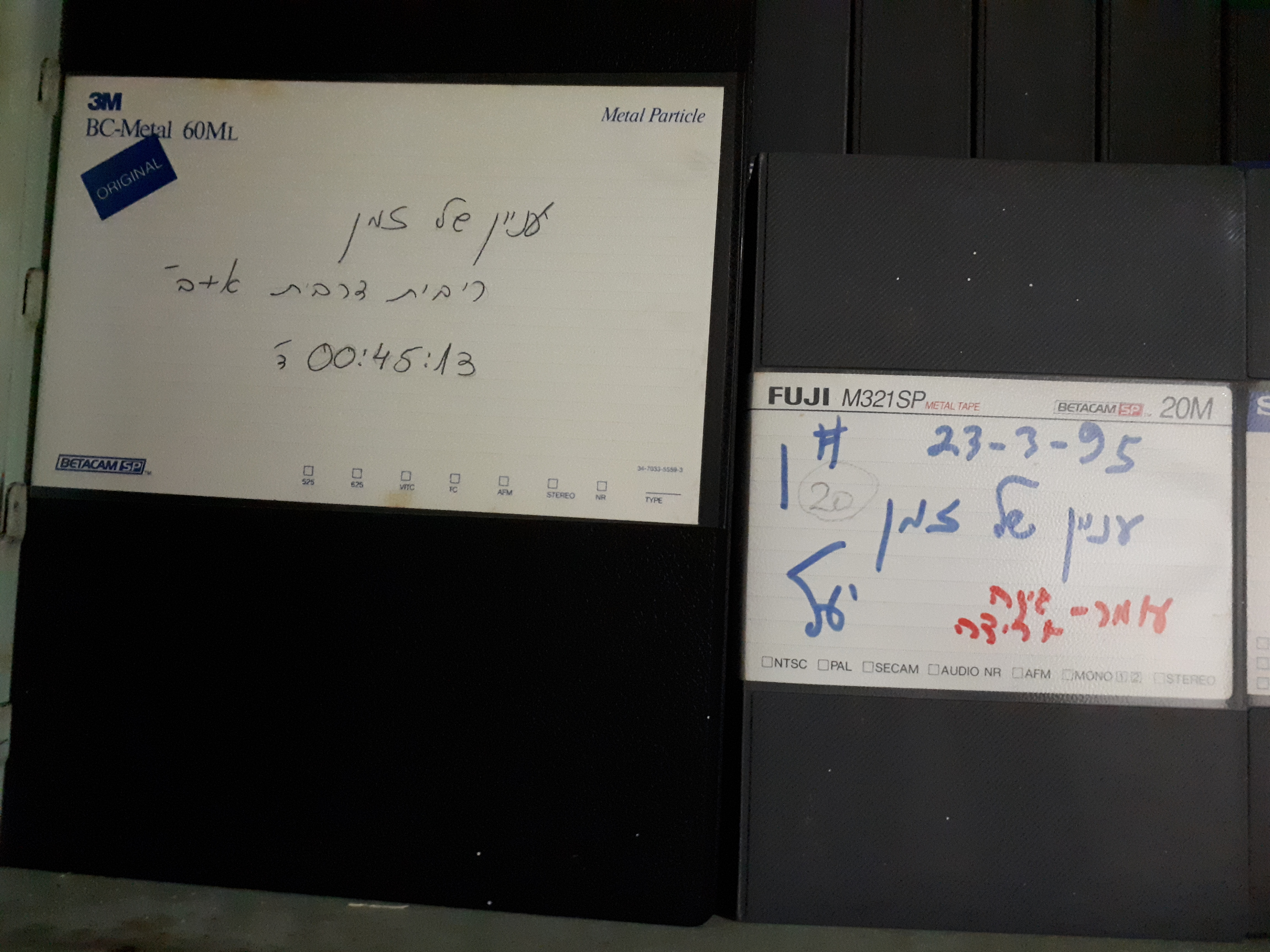
- Recordings of the show, at the archive of the IETV
- Also known as: A Matter of Time
- Genre: Drama
- Written by: Ronit Weiss-Berkowitz
- Directed by: Yael Graf; Shirley Stern
- Starring: Moshe Ben-Basat; Shai Kapon; Dana Berger; Sharon Haziz; Ayelet Zurer; Esti Yerushalmi; Uri Banai; Aviv Geffen
- Opening theme: Inyan Shel Zman by Gidi Gov
- Country of origin: Israel
- Original language: Hebrew
- No. of seasons: 4
- No. of episodes: 57

Production
- Producer: Emanuel Man
- Editor: Yael Graf
- Running time: 22-26 minutes

Original release
- Network: Israeli Educational Television
- Release: September 2, 1992 – May 13, 1996

Inyan Shel Zman (Hebrew: עניין של זמן) or A Matter of Time is an Israeli teen drama broadcast from 1992 until 1996 on Israeli Educational Television.

The series focused on stories of high school students in Tel Aviv and talked about issues of adolescents such as school, adolescence, love, drafting to the army, social gaps, rape, violence and more. The series would focus in each episode on various secondary characters and show their world and their problems, in addition to the central plot which evolved around the main characters.

The series was directed by Yael Graph and Shirley Stern, and written by Ronit Weiss Berkowitz and Eyal Graph.

The theme song to the series was written by Ehud Manor, composed by Rami Kleinstein and performed by Gidi Gov.

In the years 1998-1999 a spin-off to the series was produced called "Esrim plus". The show ran for 2 seasons.

In 2010 Reshet announced a continuation of the series would be produced.. The revived show, which premiered in 2012 under the same name, revisits many of the characters from the original series, 20 years later. This show ran for one season consisting of 13 episodes.

== Cast and characters ==
- Ido Markovich (Hebrew: עידו מרקוביץ') (Moshe Ben-Basat) - Weizmann's best friend. A handsome and charming guy who was the boyfriend of quite a few girls in the class (among them are Dana, Sharon and Omer).
- Yehezkel Weizman(Hebrew: יחזקאל ויצמן) (Shai Kapon) - Ido's best friend. His mother lives overseas and left him alone to live in Israel.
- Dana (Hebrew: דנה) (Dana Berger) - A mischievous, gossipy and somewhat flamboyant girl. Sharon's best friend in seasons 1-2 and Gali's in seasons 3-4. Later, the girlfriend of Dean who turns out to be a drug dealer and lets her try them. As a result, she becomes addicted and her condition worsens. Aviv is in love with her.
- Sharon Cohen (Hebrew: שרון כהן) (Sharon Haziz) - Ido Markovich's good friend
- Noga Caspi (Hebrew: נגה כספי) (Ayelet Zurer) - A snobbish teenager. She is very smart and often gets good grades.
- Gali (Hebrew: גלי) (Esti Yerushalmi) - A teenager without confidence and a good friend of Noga
- Tomer Ben-David (Hebrew: תומר בן דוד) (Uri Banai) - A good boy from a poor family who had to fight the social gap. He came from Sharon's neighborhood "Neve Yigal".
- Matti Harel (Hebrew: מתי הראל) (Amit Lior) - The physical education teacher. He is very strict, but cares a lot about his students outside of class.
- Menashe Gabay (Hebrew: מנשה גבאי) (Amikam Levi) - A grumpy and boring history teacher
- Fogel (Hebrew: פוגל) - The school principal, an unseen character
- Aviv (Hebrew: אביב) (Aviv Geffen) - A slightly unusual boy, sensitive and rebellious, in love with Dana and used to give her strange gifts, such as a turtle and turtle food.
- Alon Luz (Hebrew: אלון לוז) (Uri Gottlieb) - A sensitive boy, desperately in love with Noga. Suffers from a problem in his heart and because of it finds it difficult to enlist in the combat force as he wanted.
- Saar (Hebrew: סער) (Saar Badishi) - A sensitive musician who came to school after his friend was injured in a car accident and became unresponsive. Later befriends Sarit.
- Sarit Ochayun (Hebrew: שרית אוחיון) (Galit Giat) - A confident student who comes from an adoptive family. Later in the series she becomes Saar's girlfriend. She refused to receive a Bible because of the assassination of Yitzhak Rabin by a religious man.
- Dean Bernstein (Hebrew: דין) (Eran Advir) - Joins the class at the beginning of the third season as a resident returning from England. A boy with a tendency to delinquency who later turns out to be a drug dealer. When he was Dana's boyfriend, he tempted her to try drugs and caused her to become addicted to them and as a result her condition worsened.
- Dafna (Hebrew: דפנה) (Michal Kapata) - The school beauty queen, she is rich and spoiled
- Michal (Hebrew: מיכל) (Hagit Shamli) - Weizman's girlfriend, whom he calls "Mufletta". A clothes designer. She tends to fight with her little sister who suffers from mild intellectual disability.
- Omer Pikovski (Hebrew: עומר) (Neta Sobol) - A quiet and shy girl, who experienced mental and physical abuse from her mother. She befriends Dean and Sarit and later falls in love with Ido.
- Itay Katz (Hebrew: איתי כץ) (Yaron Motola) - A student who returned from the United States at the beginning of the second season and befriended his classmate Alexandra, who immigrated from Russia. Itay suspected for a certain period that he had homosexual tendencies, but finally decided that he did not have such tendencies. Later he became the boyfriend of Keren.
- Lior (Hebrew: ליאור) (Lior Halfon) - Dafna's boyfriend.
- Yaron Segal (Hebrew: ירון סגל) (Tomer Sharon) - A rebellious, intelligent student who moved from every class in the grade and slowly integrates into the class focused on in the series, is in love with Noga. His friend from Nahariya has AIDS.
- Nir Benbenisti (Hebrew: ניר בן-בנישתי) (Nir Friedman) - A student who's a fan of metal music and comes to school wearing shirts of rock and metal bands. He falls in love with Liora, the new librarian.
- Doron (Hebrew: דורון) (Mark Ivanir) - Drama teacher
- Keren Amiel (Hebrew: קרן) (Merav Shoa)
- Aviv's brother (Hebrew: אח של אביב) (Oded Menashe) - In seasons 1
