= First Baptist Church (Lincolnton, North Carolina) =

Historic church in North Carolina, United States

- The Lincoln Cultural Center also known as the former location of First Baptist Church of Lincolnton
- U.S. National Register of Historic Places
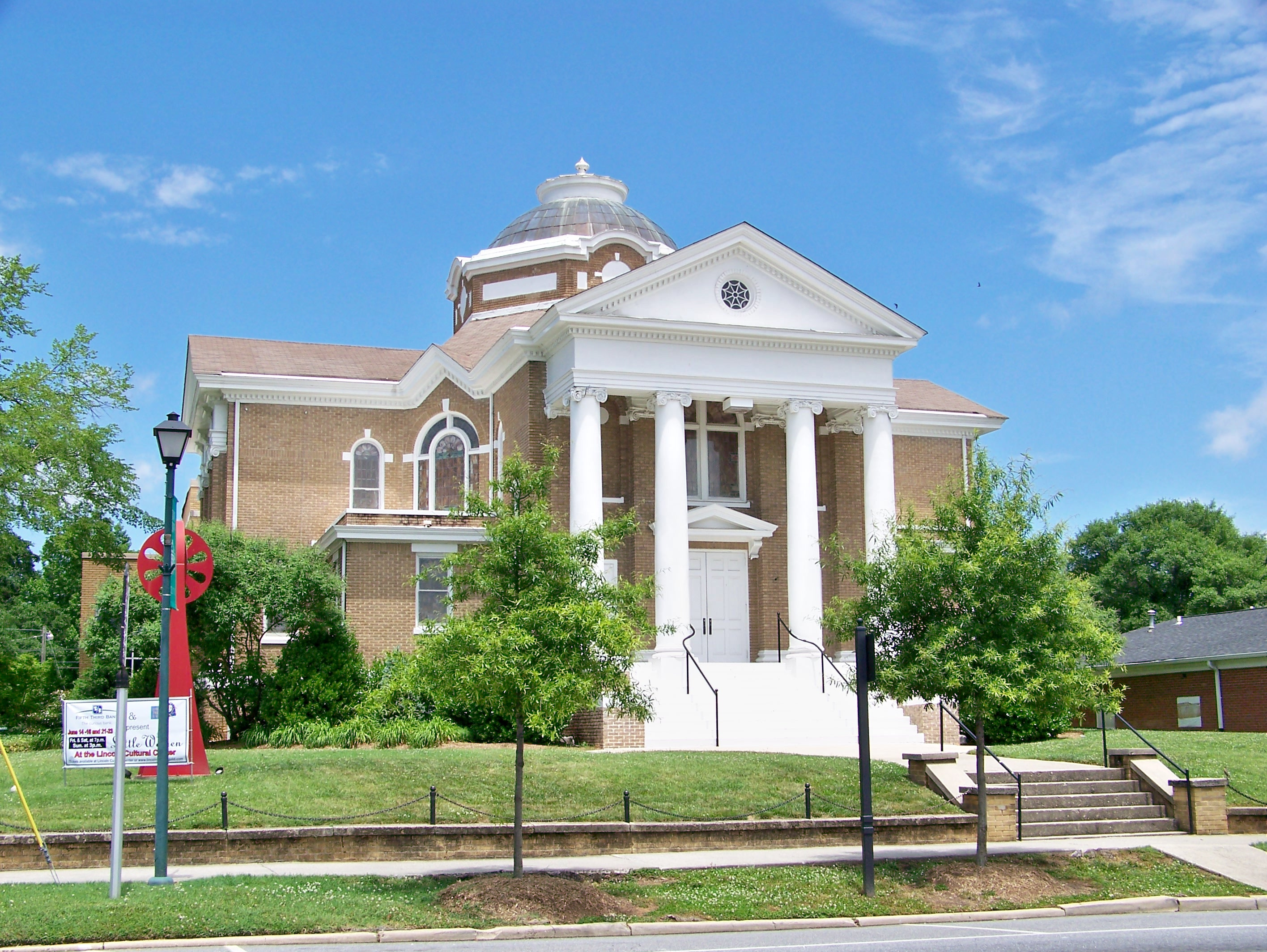

- Location within North Carolina Location within the United States
- Location: 403 E. Main St., Lincolnton, North Carolina
- Coordinates: 35°28′24″N 81°15′9″W
- Area: less than one acre
- Built: 1920-22
- Architect: McMichael, James M.
- Architectural style: Classical Revival
- MPS: Churches and Church-Related Cemeteries in Lincolnton MPS
- NRHP reference No.: 94001456
- Added to NRHP: December 21, 1994

The Lincoln Cultural Center, also known as the former First Baptist Church of Lincolnton, is a historic church location at 403 E. Main Street in Lincolnton, Lincoln County, North Carolina. The building was designed by architect James M. McMichael in a Classical Revival style with a tetrastyle two-story portico and a spherical dome. Its plans were approved in 1919; construction was completed in 1922. The building was acquired by Lincoln County and renovated as the Lincoln Cultural Center and opened for public use in September 1991.

It was added to the National Register of Historic Places in 1994. The First Baptist Church of Lincolnton is currently located at 201 Robin Road, Lincolnton, North Carolina 28092.
