= Dana Berger =

Israeli musical artist

Dana Berger דנה ברגר
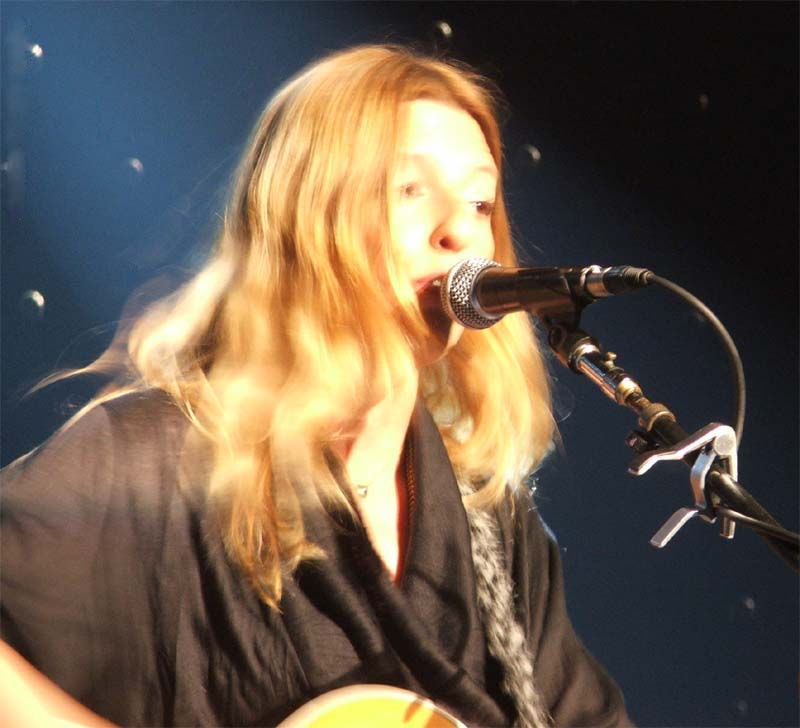

Background information
- Born: 2 November 1970 (age 55)
- Origin: Haifa, Israel
- Genres: Rock; pop
- Occupations: Singer-songwriter; actress
- Instruments: Vocals; guitar
- Years active: 1990–present
- Label: NMC

Dana Berger (Hebrew: דנה ברגר; born 2 November 1970) is an Israeli singer-songwriter and occasional actress. She is also a graduate of the Rimon School of Jazz and Contemporary Music. Berger came to fame in the 1990s, appearing on the popular TV show Inyan Shel Zman. After becoming well known, she released a number of albums, among them the widely popular album Ad Ha'Katze (To the Edge), which was certified platinum and went on to sell over 60,000 copies in Israel.

== Biography ==
Berger was born in the Nave Sha'anan, neighborhood of Haifa, grew up and was educated in Jerusalem, where she was first exposed to music and began her musical studies. At age seven she started playing piano and a few years later also guitar. Berger began writing songs at age 14. During 1987 she joined the band O Ban, which released two songs: "Plutonium Radioactive" which was written against air pollution and "The Blues", which was written against the Israel Police ("The Blues" was a nickname for policemen, who then wore blue uniforms).

In 1989 Berger served in the Israel Defense Forces as part of the Nahal entertainment troupe, but it quickly disbanded because some of its members were accused of smoking hashish.

=== Musical career ===
After finishing her military service in 1990, Berger enrolled in the Rimon School of Music and performed in the band Blagan alongside Dan Toren, serving as the lead vocalist. Additionally, during this period she contributed vocal parts to Amir Lev's debut album Want to See You in My Place.

Blagan disbanded in 1992 before releasing their only album Urban Paradise (on vinyl and CD, with an early version of "To Glide" added as a bonus track). This marked a positive turning point in Berger's career, as she began acting that same year in the TV series Inyan Shel Zman. Berger also participated in Hillel Mittelpunkt's rock opera Samara and performed the song "And I Didn't Know" (lyrics and composition: Max Gath-Mor, arrangement: Ovad Efrat) in the 1992 Festigal.

In October 1994, Berger released her self-titled debut album, writing and composing much of the material. She collaborated on melodies with Vered Klepter and on production with Johnny Shuali, Berry Sakharof, Oded Pear and Ra'am Mochiach.

== Discography ==
- Gan Eden Ironi (with Balagan) – 1992
- Dana Berger – 1994
- Pashoot Lehiot – 1999
- Ad Ha'Katze – 2000
- Toch Ke'Dei Tenuah – 2003
- Yom Yom – 2006
- Hinei Ba'ati HaBaita (with Itay Pearl) – 2010
