= Impossible on Saturday =

- Directed by: Alex Joffé
- Written by: Joseph Carl; Alex Joffé; John Perry; Ya'akov Shteiner; Shabtai Teveth
- Produced by: Yitzhak Agadati; Joseph Carl; Ya'akov Shteiner
- Cinematography: Jean Bourgoin
- Music by: Sasha Argov
- Release date: 1965
- Countries: Italy; France; Israel
- Languages: French, German, English

Impossible on Saturday (French: Pas question le samedi, lit. "No question Saturday") is a 1965 Italian-French-Israeli comedy film co-production directed by Alex Joffé.

== Cast ==
- Robert Hirsch as Carlo, plus 11 other roles
- Dalia Friedland as Deborah
- Misha Asherov as Yankel Silberschatz
- Teddy Bilisas Tulipman
- Avner Hizkiyahu as M. Meyer
- Geula Nuni as Aviva
- Yona Levy as Esther
- Rina Ganor
- Bomba Tzur as Le capitaine du bateau
- Rachel Attas as Léa
- Yael Aviv
- Ya'ackov Bodo
- Shmuel Rodensky
- Shmuel Segal
