= Ayelet Zurer =

Israeli actress (born 1969)

- איילת זורר
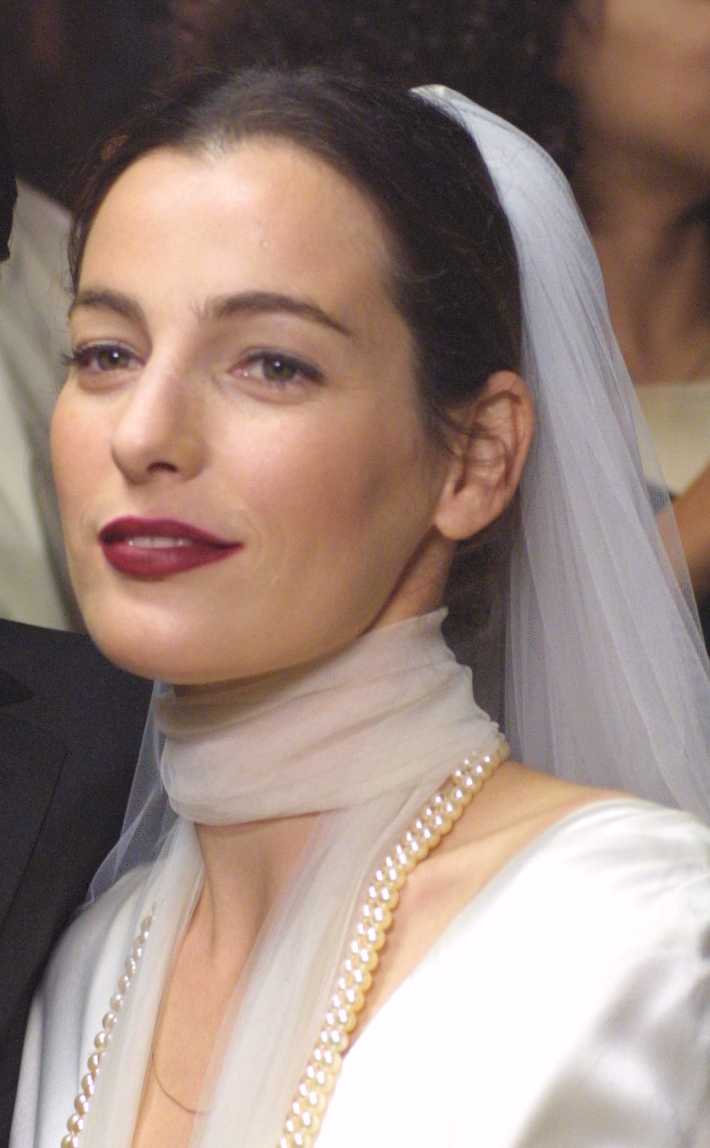
- Zurer on the set of Nina's Tragedies in 2002
- Born: Ayelet Zurer; 28 June 1969 (age 57); Tel Aviv, Israel
- Occupation: Actress
- Years active: 1992–present
- Spouse: Gilad Londovski (m. 2003)
- Children: 1

Ayelet Zurer (Hebrew: איילת זורר; born 28 June 1969) is an Israeli TV and film actress. She began her career on the Israeli teen drama Inyan Shel Zman and has starred in numerous Israeli TV and film roles. She received awards for Best Actress at the Israeli Academy Awards in 2003 and Best Actress by the Israeli Academy of Television in 2006 and 2013.

Zurer has also appeared in numerous Hollywood films, such as Munich (2005), Vantage Point (2008), Angels & Demons (2009), Man of Steel (2013), and Ben-Hur (2016). She also portrayed Vanessa Marianna-Fisk in the Marvel Cinematic Universe television series Daredevil (2015–2018) and its revival series Daredevil: Born Again (2025–2026).

== Personal life ==
Ayelet Zurer was born to a Jewish family on 28 June 1969 and raised in Tel Aviv, Israel. Her mother was born in Czechoslovakia and survived the Holocaust by hiding in a convent, later immigrating to Israel in the 1950s. Her Israeli-born father is of Russian Jewish descent.

Zurer studied theater at the 14th Municipal High School and participated in the Tel Aviv Scouts band. During her service in the Israel Defense Forces, she served in the military band of the Northern Command.

After finishing her military service, Zurer studied acting for three years at the Yoram Loewenstein Performing Arts Studio. She then moved to the United States and studied with George Morison at the Actor's Workshop in New York City. In 1991, she returned to Israel.

In 2003, Zurer married her surfing instructor, Gilad Londovski. The couple have a son and reside in Los Angeles.

== Acting career ==
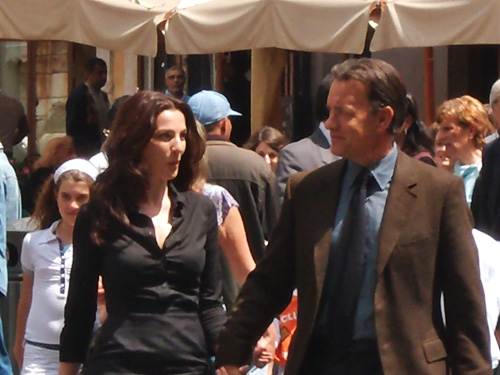
Zurer and Tom Hanks outside the Pantheon in Rome in the 2008 film Angels & Demons

=== 1991–2000 ===
Zurer landed an early role as a series regular on the Israeli teen drama, Inyan Shel Zman (1992–1993). In 1993, she also played Debbie in the Israeli comedy film Nikmato shel Itzik Finkelstein (Revenge of Itzik Finkelstein). During, this time she also participated in the cable television show Yetziat Hirum.

From 1997 to 2000, she had a regular role as Shira Steinberg in the Israeli television show Florentine. Her character, Shira, shared the first-ever lesbian kiss on Israeli television with Ronit Elkabetz's character Nicole in a 2000 episode.

In 1998, she played the lead in the film Ahava Asura (a.k.a. The Dybbuk of the Holy Apple Field). She then appeared in the Israeli television series Zinzana in 2000.

=== 2001–2010 ===
In 2001, Zurer starred in the movies Laila Lelo Lola and Kikar Ha'Halomot (Desperado Square). She appeared in the television series Shalva and Ha'Block in 2002.

In 2003, she starred in Nina's Tragedies, portraying the title character, Nina, a role for which she won an Israeli Academy Award for Best Actress. In 2005, she starred in the Israeli television series Betipul. She played Na'ama Lerner. The series won her a Best Actress award from the Israeli Television Academy and was remade as the HBO series In Treatment. The following year, Zurer participated in an Israeli sketch comedy television show called Gomrot Holchot.

In 2005, Zurer appeared in Steven Spielberg's Munich, where she played Avner Kaufman's wife. In 2007, she starred in Fugitive Pieces.

In 2008, Zurer appeared in the American thriller Vantage Point. That same year, she was cast as scientist Vittoria Vetra, in The Da Vinci Code sequel Angels & Demons (2009). Additionally, she played a nurse who falls in love with the title character in Adam Resurrected (2008).

=== 2011–2020 ===
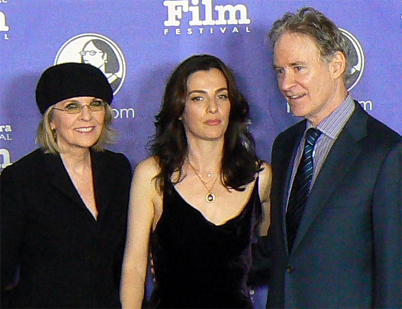
Zurer with Diane Keaton and Kevin Kline in 2012

In 2011, Zurer played the lead role in the film Hide Away and the role of Superman's mother, Lara Lor-Van, in the reboot of the Superman franchise Man of Steel (2013). In 2013, she starred in the Israeli series Shtisel, as Elisheva Rotstein.

In 2015, Zurer starred in the Marvel series Daredevil as Vanessa Marianna-Fisk. She appeared in the Hollywood film Ben-Hur (2016). In 2018, Zurer reprised her role in the third season of Daredevil.

In November 2020, Zurer was cast in a recurring role on the third season of the Netflix psychological thriller series You.

=== 2021–present ===
In 2021, Zurer starred in the Israeli psychological thriller Losing Alice on Apple TV+. In 2024, she starred as Dr. Amalia Levy alongside Amos Tamam in the Israeli drama series The Best Worst Thing on Keshet 12.

In 2025, Zurer reprised the role of Vanessa Marianna-Fisk in Marvel's Daredevil: Born Again.

== Awards ==
Zurer has received several awards throughout her career, including Best Actress at the Israeli Academy Awards for her role in Nina's Tragedies (2003) and Best Actress by the Israeli Academy of Television for her roles in BeTipul and Hostages in 2006 and 2013.

== Filmography ==
=== Film ===
Year	Title	Role	Notes
1991	Pour Sacha (a.k.a. For Sasha)	Shoshana	French drama
1993	Revenge of Itzik Finkelstein (a.k.a. Nikmato Shel Itzik Finkelstein)	Debbie	
1997	Ahava Asura (Forbidden Love, a.k.a. The Dybbuk of the Holy Apple Field)	Lea	
2001	Kikar Ha'Halomot (a.k.a. Desperado Square)	Gila (the waitress)	
2003	Ish Ha'Hashmal (a.k.a. Rutenberg)	Becki	
2003	Ha'Asonot Shel Nina (Nina's Tragedies)	Nina	
2004	Mashehu Matok (Something Sweet)	Tamar	
2005	Munich	Daphna Kaufman	
2007	Fugitive Pieces	Michaela	
2007	Rak Klavim Ratzim Hofshi (a.k.a. Wild Dogs)	Telma	
2008	Vantage Point	Veronica	
2008	Adam Resurrected	Gina Grey	
2009	Ingenious	Gina	
2009	Angels & Demons	Vittoria Vetra	
2011	Hide Away	The Waitress	
2012	Darling Companion	Carmen	
2013	Man of Steel	Lara Lor-Van	
2015	Last Days in the Desert	Mother	
2015	Last Knights	Naomi	
2016	Ben-Hur	Naomi Ben-Hur	
2017	Milada	Milada Horáková	Also producer

=== Television ===
Year	Title	Role	Notes
1992–1993	Inyan Shel Zman (a.k.a. A Matter of Time)	Noga Caspi	Main cast; 27 episodes
1997–2000	Florentine	Shira	Main cast; 39 episodes
1999	Zinzana	Hanita Rozen 'Georgi'	Episode: "Georgi"
2001	Laila Lelo Lola (a.k.a. A Night Without Lola)	Oshrit	TV movie
2004	Maktub	Michal	TV movie
2005	BeTipul (a.k.a. In Therapy)	Na'ama Lerner	9 episodes
2012	Awake	Alina Ananyev	Episode: "Nightswimming"
2012	Touch	Rosemary Mathis	Episode: "Closer"
2012	Halo 4: Forward Unto Dawn	Colonel Mehaffey	5 episodes
2013	Shtisel	Elisheva	12 episodes
2013	Hostages	Dr. Yael Danon	10 episodes
2014	Rake	Fiona Rinaldi	Episode: "Bigamist"
2015–2018	Daredevil	Vanessa Marianna / Vanessa Fisk	Main cast; 11 episodes
2017	Taken	Leah	Episode 8: "Leah"
2017	Transparent	Ronit	Episode: "I Never Promised You a Promised Land"
2019	Money Heist	Raquel Murillo	2nd English dub
2019, 2022	Legacies	Seylah	2 episodes
2020	Losing Alice	Alice	Main cast; 8 episodes
2021	You	Dr. Chandra	2 episodes
2022	Moonhaven	Maite Voss	Main cast; 6 episodes
2022	Law & Order: Organized Crime	Tia Leonetti	2 episodes
2024	The Best Worst Thing	Dr. Amalia Levy	Main cast; 8 episodes
2025	House of David	Ahinoam	Main cast; 12 episodes
2025–2026	Daredevil: Born Again	Vanessa Fisk	Main cast; 14 episodes

== Awards ==
Year	Group	Award	Result	Film/Show
1997	Israeli Film Academy Awards	Best Actress	Nominated	Ahava Asura
2000	Israeli Film Academy Awards	Best Supporting Actress	Nominated	Kikar Ha'Halomot
2001	Israeli Film Academy Awards	Best Actress	Nominated	Ish Ha'Hashmal
2003	Israeli Film Academy Awards	Best Actress	Won	Ha'Asonot Shel Nina
2003	Jerusalem Film Festival	Best Actress	Won	Ha'Asonot Shel Nina
2006	Israeli Film Academy Awards	Best Supporting Actress	Nominated	Rak Klavim Ratzim Hofshi
2006	Israeli Television Academy Awards	Best Actress	Won	Betipul
2013	Israeli Television Academy Awards	Best Actress in a Drama Series	Nominated	Shtisel
2013	Israeli Television Academy Awards	Best Actress in a Drama Series	Won	Hostages

== See also ==
- Television in Israel
- Israeli cinema
