= Pour Sacha =

- Theatrical release poster
- Directed by: Alexandre Arcady
- Written by: Alexandre Arcady; Antoine Lacomblez
- Produced by: Robert Benmussa
- Starring: Sophie Marceau; Gérard Darmon; Ayelet Zurer
- Cinematography: Robert Alazraki
- Edited by: Martine Barraqué
- Music by: Philippe Sarde Naomi Shemer
- Production companies: Alexandre Films, Canal+
- Distributed by: Union Générale Cinématographique
- Release date: 10 April 1991 (France)
- Running time: 114 minutes
- Country: France
- Language: French

Pour Sacha (English title: For Sacha) is a 1991 French romantic drama film directed by Alexandre Arcady and starring Sophie Marceau, Gérard Darmon, and Ayelet Zurer. The film is set just prior to the outbreak of the Six-Day War in 1967.

Film critic Hagai Levi argued that the film tries to condense a century of Zionism into just 100 minutes, creating a confusing and captivating narrative.

== Plot ==
Sacha and Laura, who have been living on a kibbutz in Israel near the Syrian border for two years, are visited by three friends from Paris – Simon, Michel, and Paul – who have come to celebrate Laura's twentieth birthday. One of the friends, Simon, is obsessed by the death of the girl he loved. During the birthday celebration, he tries to find amongst his friends someone to blame for his love's death. Laura is the only one who knows that the young girl died of a broken heart. She also loved Sacha. The film ends as war is declared in Israel.

== Cast ==
- Sophie Marceau as Laura
- Richard Berry as Sacha
- Fabien Orcier as Paul
- Niels Dubost as Simon
- Frédéric Quiring as Michel
- Jean-Claude de Goros as Dam Chemtov
- Gérard Darmon as David Malka
- Emmanuelle Riva as Mrs. Malka
- Shlomit Cohen as Myriam
- Yael Abecassis as Judith
- Amit Goren as Steve
- Nissim Zohar as Le Maskir
- Salim Dau as Wallid
- Ayelet Zurer as Shoshana
- Ezra Kafri as Le colonel
- Michal Yannai as Anglaise n° 1
