= Lev Kogan-Bernstein =

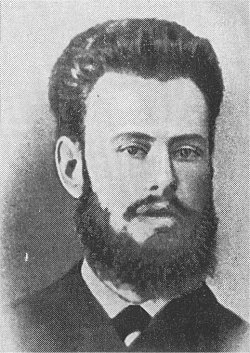
- Born: 1862; Kishinev, Bessarabia Governorate, Russian Empire
- Died: 7 August 1889 (aged 26–27); Yakutsk, Russian Empire
- Cause of death: Execution by hanging
- Education: Saint Petersburg Imperial University (expelled)
- Political party: Narodnaya Volya

Lev Matveyevich Kogan-Bernstein (Russian: Лев Матвеевич Коган-Бернштейн; 1862 — 7 August 1889), also known as Leo Kogan-Bernstein, was a Russian revolutionary and a member of Narodnaya Volya.

== Biography ==
Lev Kogan-Bernstein was born in 1862 in Kishinev (present-day Chișinău, Moldova) into a Jewish merchant family. His father, Matvey (Motl, Mordko) Volkovich Bernstein-Kogan, was a third-guild merchant in Kishinev and later a second-guild merchant in Odessa; his mother was Dvoira (Dora) Bernstein-Kogan. The family lived in their own house on Boyukanskaya Street (corner of Gostinaya and Kaushanskaya streets).

From 1871 to 1874 he studied at the Kishinev progymnasium, then transferred to the fourth class of the Kishinev Governorate Gymnasium. In 1878, due to his participation in the “Kishinev Liberal Society,” he was forced to leave the gymnasium and transferred to the Berdyansk Gymnasium, which he graduated from in 1880. That same year he became a student in the mathematics division of the Faculty of Physics and Mathematics at Saint Petersburg University, where in the early 1880s he was part of the central university circle of Narodnaya Volya.

On 8 February 1881, he interrupted a speech by the Minister of National Education, Saburov, at Saint Petersburg University with a protest speech against the ministry’s policy toward students. Kogan-Bernstein demanded the restoration of the 1864 university statute; another student, Pappy Podbelsky, slapped the minister.

He carried out propaganda work among workers in Saratov and Moscow. He was arrested in April 1881 and exiled to Siberia, settling in Yakutsk. In Yakutsk, he married another political exile, Natalya Osipovna Baranova (after marriage — Kogan-Bernstein, 1861–1927).

He took part in an armed uprising of political exiles in Yakutsk, which ended in a firefight between the exiles and soldiers. Kogan-Bernstein, together with other exiles, was brought before a military court on charges of armed resistance and sentenced to death. Seriously wounded (his legs were shot through) during the clash with soldiers, Lev Matveyevich Kogan-Bernstein was unable to stand; both to the court and later to the gallows he was carried on a bed. He was executed by hanging.

Let our final farewell be illuminated by hope for a better future for our poor, poor, dearly beloved homeland! Never will a single drop of strength disappear in the world — and therefore human life will not be wasted in vain! I shall die with a clear conscience and the awareness that I remained faithful to my duty and my convictions to the very end; and can there be a better, happier death?

— From his last letter before death

== Family ==
- Wife — Natalya Osipovna Kogan-Bernstein (née Baranova). Her brother was the Narodnik revolutionary Ilya Osipovich Baranov.
- Son — Matvey Lvovich Kogan-Bernstein (1886–1918), member of the Socialist-Revolutionary Party and of the Constituent Assembly of Russia. He was arrested by the Bolsheviks in the frontline village of Cherny Zaton near Syzran and executed by sentence of a field military court (according to the Small Soviet Encyclopedia, after breaking with his party during the Czechoslovak Legion uprising, he was shot by White Guards in the village of Cherny Zaton, Syzransky Uyezd, Simbirsk Governorate, as a member of the Constituent Assembly). His widow was the translator from Old French, medieval historian, and professor at Moscow State University Faina Abramovna Kogan-Bernstein (née Arongauz, 1899–1976), who in 1925 remarried the historian and philosopher Pavel Solomonovich Yushkevich (1873–1945), brother of the writer Semyon Yushkevich and father of the historian of science Andrei Yushkevich.
- Brother — Yakov Matveyevich Bernstein-Kogan, Zionist public figure and physician. His daughter (niece of L. M. Kogan-Bernstein) was the Israeli actress and founder of Hebrew theatre in Mandatory Palestine Miriam Yakovlevna Bernstein-Kogan.
- Sister — Anna Matveyevna Bernstein-Kogan, Doctor of Medicine.
- Nephew — Sergey Vladimirovich Bernstein-Kogan, economic geographer.

== Legacy ==
During his time at the Kishinev Gymnasium, he befriended Constantin Stere. In Stere's novel, În preajma revoluției (On the Eve of the Revolution), the character Moise Roitman is based on Kogan-Bernstein.
