= Bob Yerkes =

American stuntman (1932–2024)

- Born: Brayton Walter Yerkes; February 11, 1932; Santa Monica, California, U.S.
- Died: October 1, 2024 (aged 92); Northridge, California, U.S.
- Occupation: Stuntman
- Spouse: Dorothy Morales (m. 1953, divorced)
- Children: 1

Brayton Walter Yerkes (February 11, 1932 – October 1, 2024), known professionally as Bob Yerkes, was an American stuntman.

== Career ==
Born in Santa Monica, California, on February 11, 1932, Yerkes began a life of acrobatics in the circus at the age of 15. He began his career in film stunts in 1948, and went on to work as a stuntman in such films as Back to the Future, Return of the Jedi, and Hook. Yerkes later hosted stunt training days, on an invitation-only basis at his home in the Northridge section of Los Angeles, which had a backyard that contained extensive rigging for stunt work. He continued to amass film credits until 2017.

== Personal life and death ==
Yerkes was a Christian, having joined the religion in his youth.

In 1953, Yerkes married Dorothy Morales, a fellow circus performer. They had a son and divorced in the 1970s. Bob Yerkes died from complications of pneumonia at a hospital in Northridge, on October 1, 2024. He was 92.

== Filmography ==
Year	Film	Role
1948	Julia Misbehaves	Stunts
1954	The Silver Chalice	Stunts, actor
1956	Trapeze	Stunts
1959	The Big Circus	Actor (uncredited), technical advisor
1970	Airport	Stunts
1974	Airport 1975	Stunts
1974	Earthquake	Stunts
1974	The Towering Inferno	Stunts
1975	Breakout	Stunts
1983	Return of the Jedi	Stunts
1984	Ghostbusters	Stunts
1985	Back to the Future	Stunts
1986	Ferris Bueller's Day Off	Stunts
1988	Who Framed Roger Rabbit	Stunts
1989	Honey, I Shrunk the Kids	Stunts
1990	Back to the Future Part III	Stunts
1991	Hook	Stunts
1993	Robin Hood: Men in Tights	Stunts
1995	Batman Forever	Technical advisor
1999	Magnolia	Stunts
2002	Adaptation	Actor (Charles Darwin)
2006	Poseidon	Stunts
2009	Angels & Demons	Actor (Cardinal Guidera)
2009	The Butterfly Circus	Actor [Poppy]
2009	Up in the Air (short film)	Executive producer
