= Jacob Bernstein-Kogan =

Russian physician and Zionist

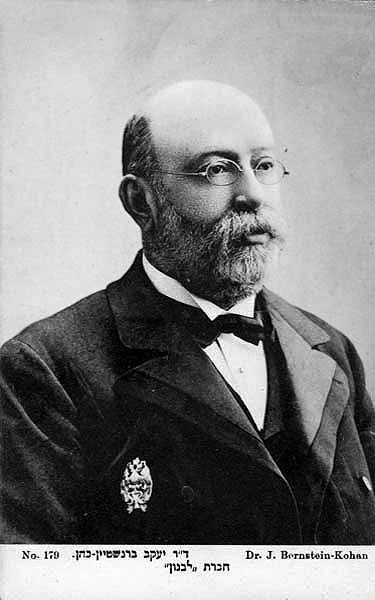
- Born: 1859; Kishinev, Bessarabia, Russian Empire
- Died: 1929 (aged 69–70)
- Occupation: physician
- Known for: Zionist and Jewish community activist
- Notable work: specialized in cholera
- Children: Miriam Bernstein-Cohen

Jacob Bernstein-Kogan (1859–1929) was a Russian physician, Zionist, and Jewish community activist.

He was born in 1859 in what is now Chișinău, Moldova (then Kishinev, Bessarabia, Russian Empire). His father was an important figure in the Kishinev Jewish community. His brother was Narodnaya Volya revolutionary Lev Kogan-Bernstein. As a Zionist activist, Bernstein-Kogan led the Kishinev correspondence bureau of the Zionist movement.

During the Kishinev pogrom, he and his family fled their home, which was looted. As a community organizer and activist, he raised money for relief and played an important role in spreading awareness of the pogrom around the world. Later, he left Kishinev out of fear that he would be murdered for raising awareness of the pogrom.

Bernstein-Kogan was a doctor by trade and specialized in cholera. Before World War I, he moved to Palestine but later returned to Europe, first to Romania and then to Soviet Crimea. He died in 1929 in Dnipro.

== Family ==
Bernstein-Kogan's daughter Miriam Bernstein-Cohen was an actress and director in Israel.
