= East Avenue Tabernacle Associate Reformed Presbyterian Church =

Historic church in North Carolina, United States

- U.S. National Register of Historic Places
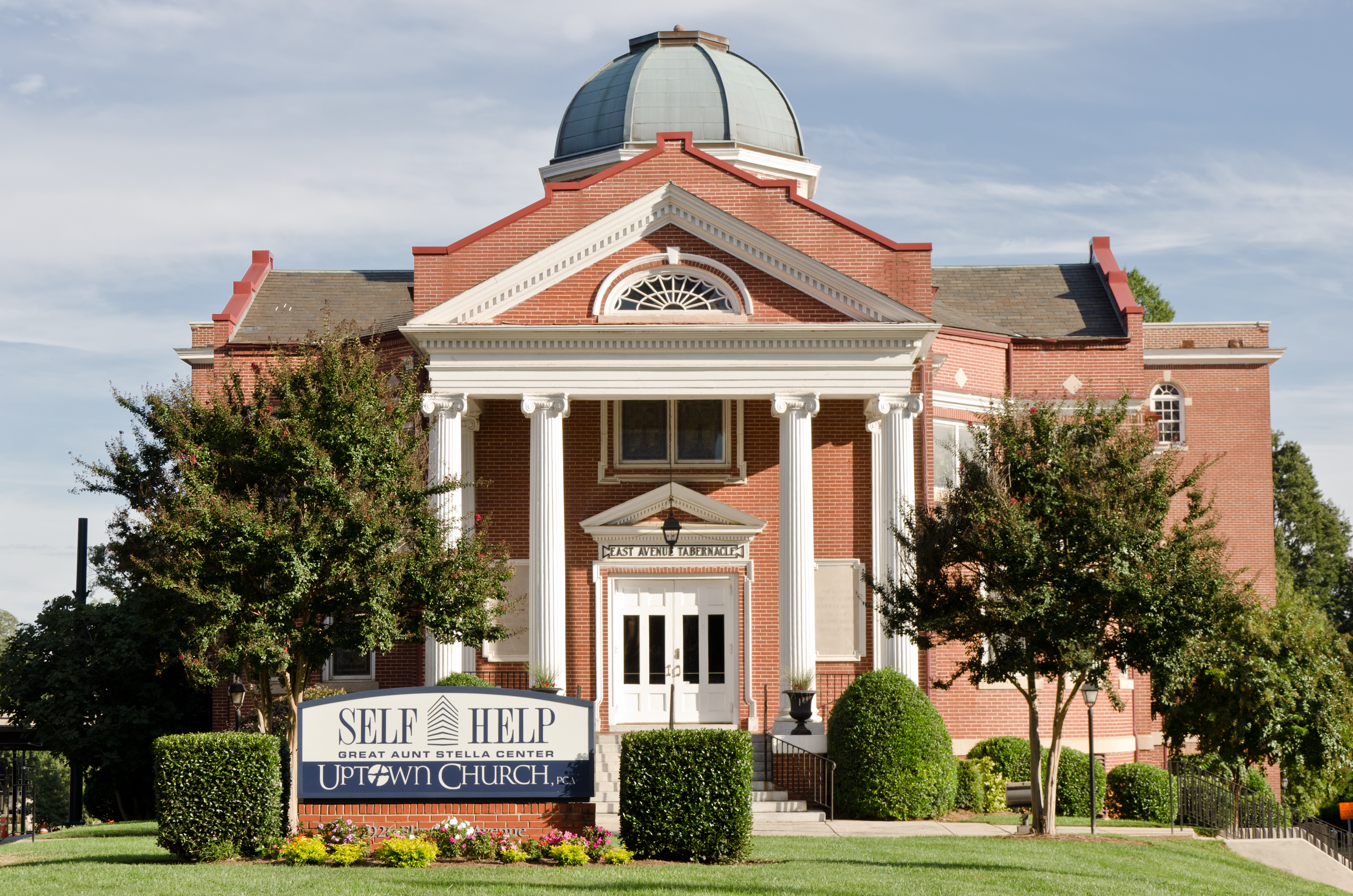

- Location within North Carolina Location within the United States
- Location: 926 Elizabeth Ave., Charlotte, North Carolina
- Coordinates: 35°13′10″N 80°50′4″W
- Area: 0.5 acres (0.20 ha)
- Built: 1914
- Architect: McMichael, James Mackson
- Architectural style: Classical Revival
- NRHP reference No.: 04001523
- Added to NRHP: January 20, 2005

East Avenue Tabernacle Associate Reformed Presbyterian Church, also known as the Great Aunt Stella Center, is a historic Associate Reformed Presbyterian church located at 927 Elizabeth Street in Charlotte, Mecklenburg County, North Carolina. It was designed by architect James M. McMichael in a Classical Revival style. It consists of a two-story sanctuary, built in 1914, and a four-story educational wing added to the south side of the sanctuary in 1925. The sanctuary has a Greek cross plan with a central octagon with shallow two-story wings that terminate in low parapeted walls. The sanctuary is topped by a copper dome and has a monumental porch with a brick pediment. In 1998 East Avenue Tabernacle merged with the Craig Avenue Associate Reformed Presbyterian Church. Ultimately the church became the Craig Avenue Tabernacle A.R.P. Church. Thus ironically through the years the name changed from East to Craig Avenue. The building now houses a community center and charter school.

It was added to the National Register of Historic Places in 2005.
