= Misha Asherov =

Israeli actor (1924–2003)

- מישא אשרוב
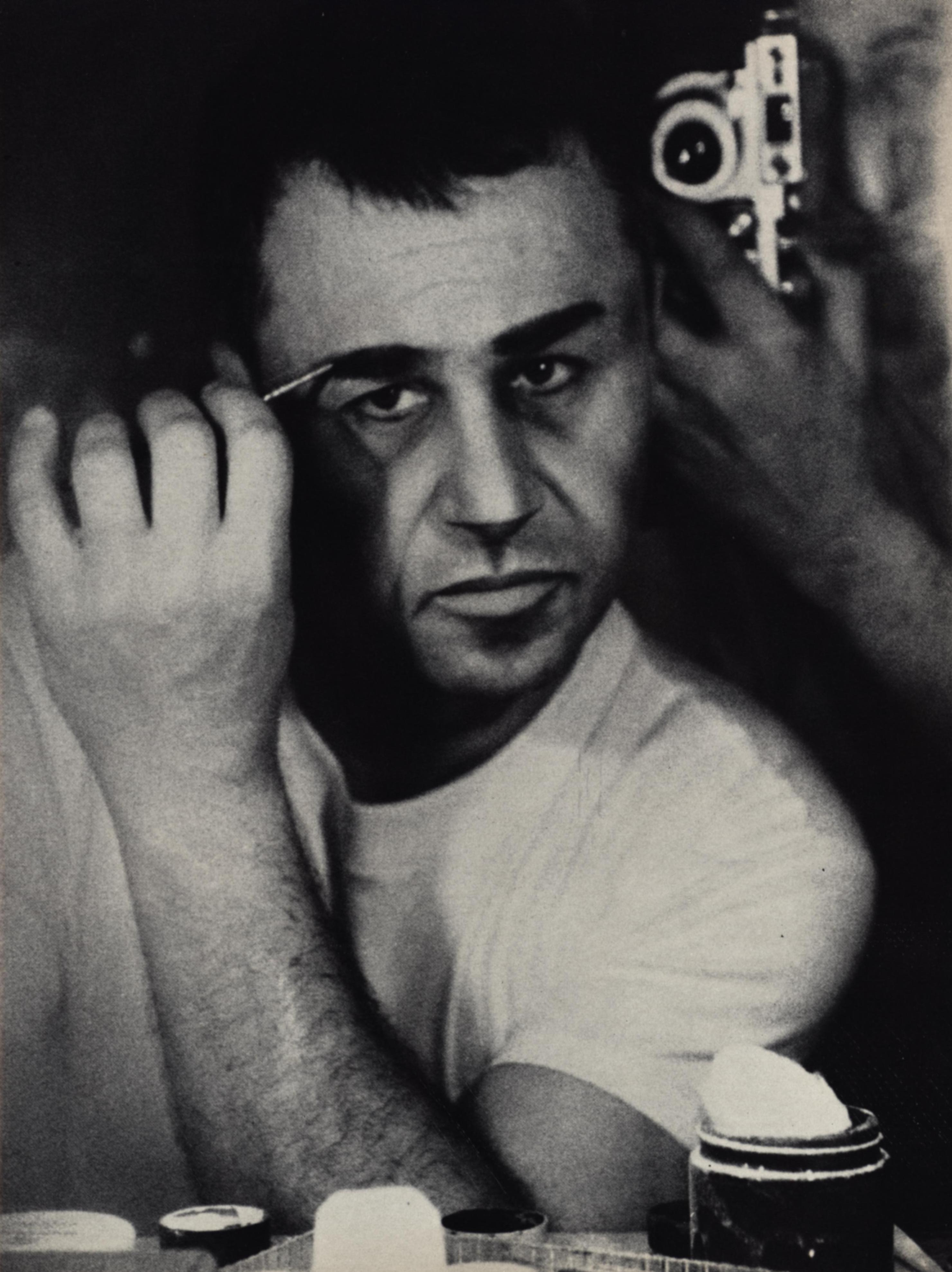
- Asherov in 1965
- Born: 24 March 1924; Samarkand, Turkestan ASSR, Soviet Union
- Died: 19 October 2003 (aged 79); Tel Aviv, Israel
- Occupations: Actor; theatre director; manager
- Years active: 1945–2003
- Spouse(s): Aviva Givati (divorced); Dalia Friedland (divorced) Bilha Moss (m. 1973)
- Children: 4, including Ayala and Chen

Misha Asherov (Hebrew: מישא אשרוב; 24 March 1924 – 19 October 2003) was an Israeli actor, theatre director and manager.

== Biography ==
Asherov was born in Samarkand in 1924. When he was six years old, he and his family began emigrating to Israel on foot with the assistance of Kurdish smugglers. After an arduous journey which lasted two years, they eventually arrived in Israel in 1933, first staying in Jaffa, eventually settling in Petah Tikva, where his father worked in a quarry. In 1945, Asherov was accepted into Habima's drama school after receiving formal training with the Habima Theatre. After graduation, he played minor roles in shows such as Hamlet. Additionally, he served as a member of the national military band during the 1948 Arab–Israeli War.

In 1955, Asherov began appearing in more prominent roles at the Habima Theatre and established himself as a leading figure in Israeli theatre with his distinctive voice and commanding stage presence. He starred in plays such as Who's Afraid of Virginia Woolf?, Julius Caesar, Long Day's Journey into Night and A View from the Bridge. In 1958, Asherov became part of the Habima's management team until he stepped down in 1989 and he received the Kinor David Prize among several other accolades for his contributions to the performing arts. In 1976, he founded and managed a children’s theatre alongside his third wife, Bilha Moss.

In addition to Asherov's extensive stage career, he also appeared in many screen productions starting from the 1960s. He made one of his earliest appearances in the 1965 film Impossible on Saturday alongside his second wife, Dalia Friedland. He also appeared prominently in films such as Kazablan and Three Days and a Child.

Asherov’s later years saw him face debilitated health issues. In 1992, he suffered a stroke. After then, he gradually decreased his activities as an actor and was confined to a wheelchair. In 2001, he staged a one-man monodrama called A Visitor in the Cherry Garden.

=== Personal life ===
Asherov has been married three times. With his first wife Aviva Givati, he had two children, Ehud and Irit. With his second wife, the actress Dalia Friedland, he had one daughter, Ayala, who is a composer. In 1973, he married the actress Bilha Moss and they had one daughter, Chen, who also became an actress.

== Death ==
After a long illness, Asherov died in Tel Aviv on 19 October 2003 at the age of 79. He was interred at Holon Cemetery.
