= Set redress =

Redecoration of a movie set for reuse

In film, a redress is the redecoration of an existing movie set so that it can double for another set. This saves the trouble and expense of constructing a second, new set, though they face the difficulty of doing it so the average viewer does not notice the same set is reused. Also there could be logistical problems, such as conflicting shooting schedules, continuity if the set is not quite the same as it was (if it should be the same) or different (if it should be). The latter problem arises because the set dresser may be unaware of changes created by the action.

== Examples ==
A good example of a successful redress occurred in the film Star Trek II: The Wrath of Khan where the bridges of the Enterprise and the Reliant were filmed on the same set. Some of the reasons for its success are as follows:

- All the scenes on the Reliant bridge were shot after the scenes on the Enterprise bridge, eliminating difficulty with continuity and conflicting shooting schedules. Only one actor, Walter Koenig, had to be present on both the Reliant and the Enterprise.
- The film was edited so that the scenes on Reliant and Enterprise are intercut with each other, strengthening the illusion that both exist simultaneously.
- It is readily apparent to the audience which ship they are on due to the presence of different characters, a different musical motif, different lighting and different seat covers.
- The Enterprise set was built so that portions of it could be moved around for filming. Therefore, the set of each bridge could be made to look slightly different, making it less readily obvious that the set was the same.
- Both Enterprise and Reliant are Federation starships, so their bridge designs would likely be similar.

However, such perfect circumstances are rare and any Trekkie will be quick to point out that the schematics seen on Reliant are clearly those of the Enterprise.

During Hollywood's studio era, the disparate studios often maintained standing sets (interior and exterior) which were intended for long-term use over multiple productions, with only minimal re-dressing. This often led to audience members recognising sets which had appeared in previous films. A double feature of two Twentieth Century-Fox films of the mid-1950s, O. Henry's Full House and We're Not Married, caused unintended laughter when two different street scenes from the respective films—a street in Manhattan circa 1900, and a street in New Orleans in the present—were very obviously the same exterior set.

== See also ==
- Backlot, the permanent exterior sets reused by major Hollywood studios during the 20th century
