= Dalia Friedland =

Israeli actress and singer

- דליה פרידלנד
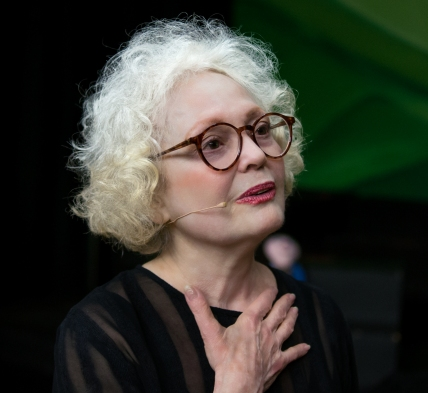
- Friedland in 2013
- Born: 13 February 1935 (age 91); Tel Aviv, Mandatory Palestine
- Occupations: Actress; singer
- Years active: 1953–present
- Spouse: Misha Asherov (divorced)
- Children: Ayala Asherov
- Parents: Zvi Friedland (father); Chanale Hendler (mother)

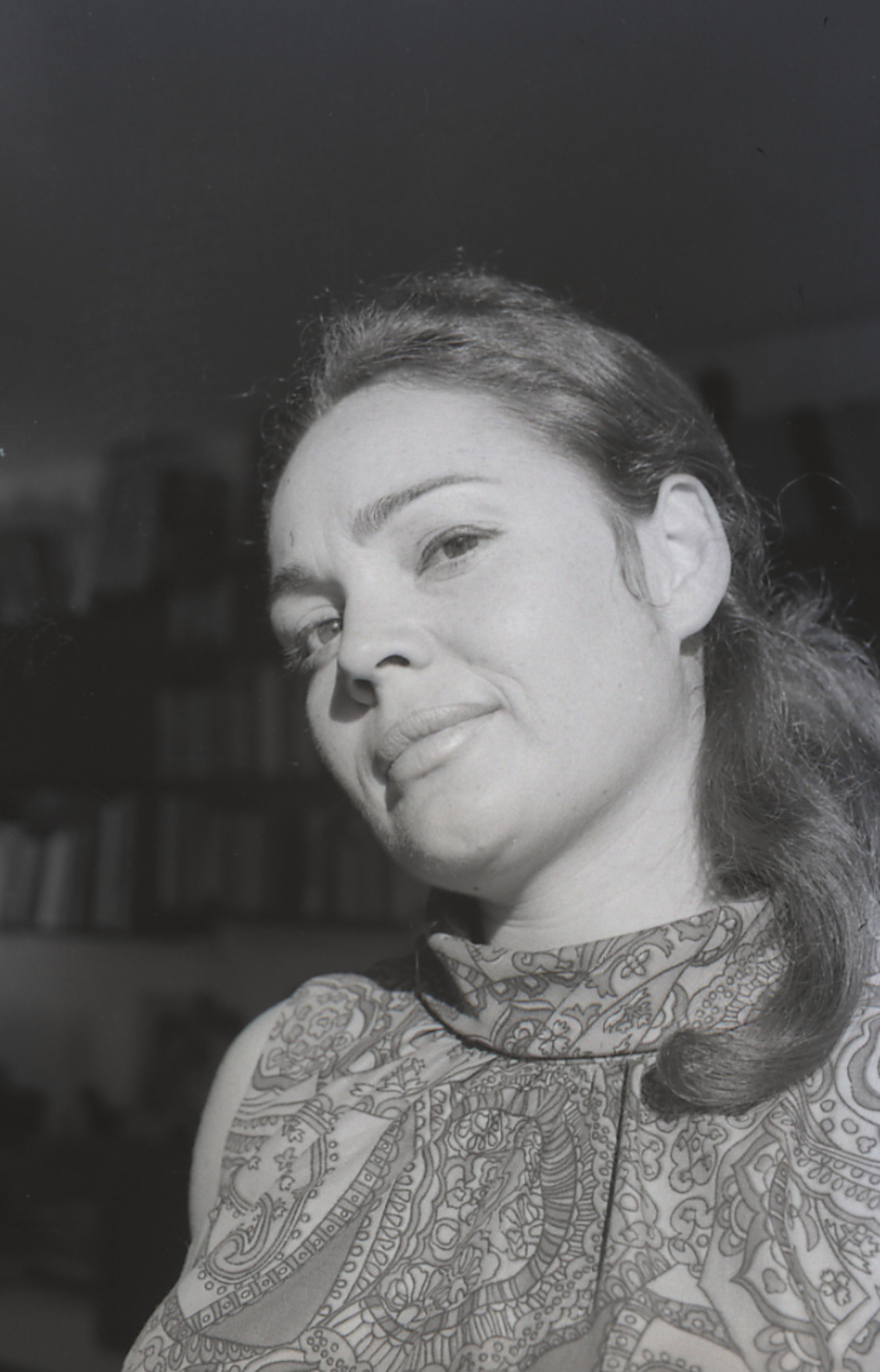
Friedland, 1968. Boris Carmi, Meitar collection, National Library of Israel.

Dalia Friedland (Hebrew: דליה פרידלנד; born 13 February 1935) is an Israeli actress and singer.

== Biography ==
Dalia Friedland was born in Tel Aviv to parents who were both actors and founders of Israel's "Habima" National Theater, Zvi Friedland and Chana Hendler. After completing two years of military service she pursued drama studies at the Central School of Speech and Drama in London along with Judi Dench, Vanessa Redgrave and Anna Cropper.

Friedland was the second wife of the late actor and theatrical director Misha Asherov. Their daughter, Ayala, is a composer.

== Acting career ==
Upon completion of her studies she returned to Israel and joined the company of the Habima Theater. She appeared in her first role in the play Night Storm (Rina), Habima Theatre, directed by her father.

She appeared in Who's Afraid of Virginia Wolf (Honey), directed by Hy Kalus, "Long Day's Journey Into Night", "Six Characters in Search of an Author", "The Seagull" (Nina), Cat on a Hot Tin Roof"(Maggie), "A Doll's House" (Nora), "The Hypochondriac", Cabaret, Abraham Goldfaden's "The Witch", one-woman show The Servant Tzerlin, and in Neil Simon's The Prisoner of Second Avenue.

She co-wrote and, along with the English actress, Anna Cropper, acted in, "Across The Bridge", the story of two Holocaust survivors, whose premiere performance was at "Yad Vashem" in Jerusalem. She also co-wrote and performed n the play If I Forget Thee oh Jerusalem for the 30000th anniversary of Jerusalem, in Israel, England and the United States, which included a special performance at the United Nations. The tour had a special emphasis on reaching non-Jewish audiences.

Friedland's biographical one-woman show, Born to the Theatre, was performed in Israel, the United States, Canada and Russia in Hebrew, English, and Russian. She was appointed to perform her one-women show by the Israeli Ministry representing Israel in an International Jewish Theatre Festival in Russia.

She appeared in several International Films, including "Impossible on Saturday" with Robert Hirsch, "Neither by Day Nor by Night" with Zalman King and Edward G. Robinson, "7 fois... par jour" with Jean Coutu and Rosanna Schiaffino.

== Shows for children ==
Friedland is known in Israel for her performances and records for children, including "Shmulik-Hedgehog" (shmoolikipod), "Shubi the Teddy Bear" (Shubi Dubi) by Gideon Koren, Babar the Elephant, barbapapa, and Lady and the Tramp.

== See also ==
- Music of Israel
- Theater of Israel
- Culture of Israel
