= Marion R. Marsh =

American architect

Marion "Steve" Marsh (October 21, 1893 – September 5, 1977) was an American architect in Charlotte, North Carolina.

Marsh came to Charlotte in 1916 as chief draftsman for architect J. M. McMichael. He opened his own practice in 1922. He designed the Coca-Cola Bottling Company building (Charlotte, North Carolina). Except for a brief period in the early 1940s, he spent his entire career in Charlotte.

== Early life ==
Marsh was born in Jacksonville, Florida, studied at the university in Jacksonville and took correspondence courses in architecture before and working at his brother's architectural firm Marsh and Saxelbye in Jacksonville. He came to Charlotte in 1916 as chief draftsman for the architectural firm of J.M. McMichael. He worked at the chemical engineering firm of Peter Gilchrist as chief architect. He opened his own practice in Charlotte in 1922.

== Career ==
Marsh was stationed in New York and Washington D.C., with the War Production Board during World War II. He served as liaison architect for the construction division of the production board. Marsh partnered with Teebe Hawkins of Atlanta in 1945.

Marsh worked from 1922 to 1964, when he retired. He designed the 1926 Builders Building at 314 West Trade Street for developer Charles Lambeth. The seven-story downtown building was a headquarters for many of Charlotte's contractors. He also designed the Charlotte Armory (destroyed) at Kings Drive and Seventh Street and the main office of Mutual Savings (1962) and Loan at 330 South Tryon Street downtown Charlotte.

The Mutual Savings building was designed in the International Style with whiteglaze masonry. His firm survived his passing to become Hawkins-Kibler Associates.

== Work ==
- Charlotte Armory (destroyed)
- Plaza Theater (destroyed)
- The Plaza Theatre
- Coca-Cola Bottling Plant (1930) at 1401-1409 West Morehead St.
- Plaza-Midwood and Eastover Elementary Schools (1936)
- Fairview Homes public housing for African-Americans
- apartment house at Queens Road and Pembroke Avenue in Myers Park (1936)
- Morris Field Army Air Base (1941)
- Ligget Drug Company building
- Charlotte Fire Station No. 2 (1948)
- Oasis Temple (1953)
- South Branch public library (1956)
- Frank Sherrill residence in Dilworth (1928)
- F. Siefart residence in Eastover
- Torrence Hemby residence in present-day Beverly Crest (1953)

=== Pre-World War II commissions outside Charlotte ===
- Jefferson County Courthouse, Gaffney, South Carolina
- Kistler Memorial Library, Morganton, North Carolina
- Kannapolis Theatre, North Carolina
- Lincolnton Theatre, North Carolina
- Hickory Theatre, North Carolina,
- Lake City Theatre, South Carolina
- Tubercular Ward, Morganton State Hospital
- H.B. Wilkenson residence, Concord, North Carolina
- W. Lineberger residence, Shelby, North Carolina
