= Miriam Bernstein-Cohen =

Israeli actress, director, poet, and translator (1895–1991)

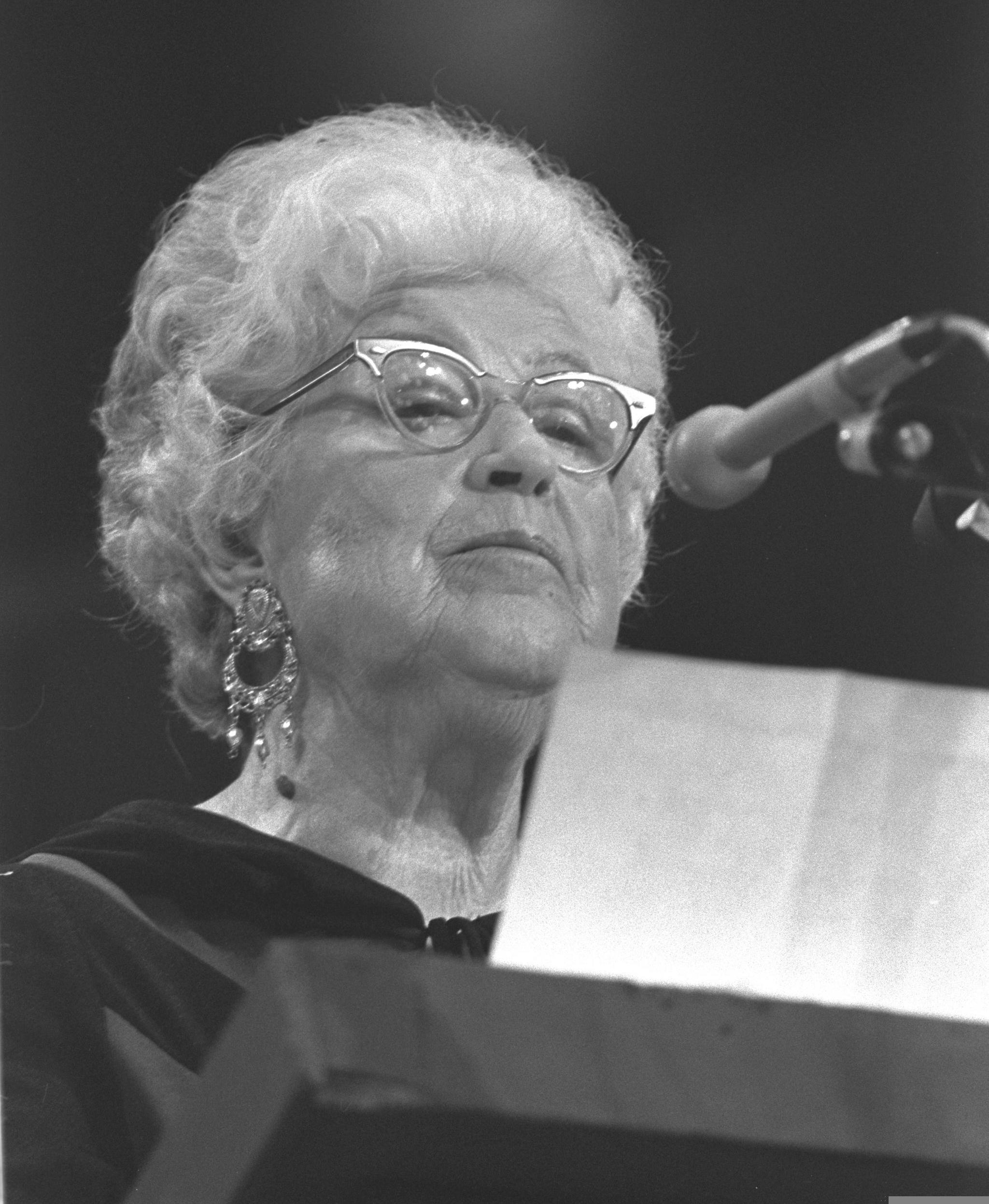
- Born: Maria Yakovlevna Bernstein-Kogan; 14 December 1895; Kishinev, Bessarabia Governorate, Russian Empire (now Moldova)
- Died: 4 April 1991 (aged 95); Tel Aviv, Israel
- Occupations: Actress, director, poet, translator
- Notable work: Founder of the first Hebrew-language periodical dedicated to theater, Te'atron ve-Omanut
- Awards: 1975: Israel Prize for theatre

Miriam Bernstein-Cohen (Russian: Мария Яковлевна Бернштейн-Коган Hebrew: מרים ברנשטיין-כהן; 1895–1991), was an Israeli actress, director, poet and translator.

Miriam Bernstein-Cohen was born in Kishinev, Russian Empire. Her father was the doctor and community activist Jacob Bernstein-Kogan. She grew up in Kharkov. After training as a medical doctor she enrolled in drama school. She studied with Konstantin Stanislavski in Moscow in 1918 before returning to Moldova as an actress, where she worked under the name Maria Alexandrova.

After immigrating to Palestine, Bernstein-Cohen settled in Tel Aviv and joined the country's first professional theater company. In 1925, she founded the first Hebrew-language periodical in Palestine dedicated to theater, Te'atron ve-Omanut.

== Awards and recognition ==
- In 1975, Bernstein-Cohen was awarded the Israel Prize, for theatre.

== See also ==
- List of Israel Prize recipients
- Theater of Israel
- Culture of Israel
