= Kalpabiswa =

Bengali science fiction magazine

- Editor: Dip Ghosh; Santu Bag, Goutam Mandal, Pramit Nandi and Supriyo Das
- Categories: Speculative fiction
- Frequency: Quarterly
- Publisher: Dip Ghosh
- Founder: Dip Ghosh and Supriyo Das
- Founded: 2015
- First issue: January 26, 2016
- Country: India
- Based in: Kolkata
- Language: Bengali
- Website: www.kalpabiswa.in

Kalpabiswa is an online Bengali language science fiction literary magazine. It is the first and biggest online sci-fi magazine published in Bengali language. Notable Bengali fiction writers like Adrish Bardhan, Ranen Ghosh, Yashodhara Ray Chaudhuri, Anish Deb and Amitananda Das have contributed to the magazine.

== Kalpabiswa Publications ==
Kalpabiswa Publications official logo.

From 2018, Kalpabiswa started its own hardcover and paperback publishing house named Kalpabiswa Publication. With the 200 years of creation of Mary Shelley's Frankenstein, Kalpabiswa has published Frankenstein 200, an anthology of Frankenstein themed fictions and non fictions, as a tribute. The book was launched at the campus of Jadavpur University during the first International Conference on science fiction held in Kolkata.

=== Notable books ===
- Kaalsandarva by Ankita (2018)
- Kalpabiswa: Upanyash Parba 1 (2018)
- Frankenstein 200 (2018)
- Siddhartha Ghosh Rachana Sangraha (2019)
- Siddhartha Ghosh Rachana Sangraha 2 (2020)
- Sera Aschorjyo Sera Fantastic (2019)
- Sabuj Manush (2019)
- Arthotrishna by Sumit Bardhan (2019)
- Nakkhatra Pathik by Sumit Bardhan (2020)
- Kalpabigyan Samagra by Rebanta Goswami (2020)
- Decagon by Riju Ganguly (2020)
- Manan Shil by Partha De (2020)
- Swamohimay Sanku by Satyajit Ray and Sudip Deb (2020)

=== Notable translations ===
Kalpabiswa has published Bengali translations of notable authors like Jules Verne, Herbert George Wells, Howard Phillips Lovecraft, Ray Bradbury, Arthur C. Clarke and many more classic science fiction masters. They have also translated more contemporary authors like Philip K. Dick, Elizabeth Bear and Cixin Liu.

==== Translation of "Roy of the Rovers" ====
On 2 December 2025, through its official Facebook page, Kalpabiswa Publications announced that it holds the exclusive rights to translate and publish Roy of the Rovers in Bengali under contract with Rebellion Publishing Limited.

We are pleased to formally announce that we hold the exclusive rights to translate and publish Roy of the Rovers in the Bengali language under a valid and active contract with Rebellion Publishing Limited (UK).

Rebellion Publishing has confirmed that Kalpabiswa Publications is the sole authorized Bengali-language publisher of this iconic series.

Sayak Dutta Choudhury translated the comics for Kalpabiswa. The first volume of the Bengali translation was released at the 2026 International Kolkata Book Fair. They plan to publish the subsequent volumes on a bimonthly or quarterly basis.

- Rovers-er Roy: Part 1 (56 pages, January 2026, ISBN 978-93-47889-02-8)
- Rovers-er Roy: Part 2 (56 pages, April 2026, ISBN 978-93-47889-59-2)

=== Aschorjyo and Bismoy Science fiction awards ===
From 2023, Kalpabiswa Publication and Pratisruti are sponsoring the only science fiction awards in Bengali. The Aschorjyo award, given for considerable contribution to Kalpabigyan is given by Kalpabiswa. The Bismoy science fiction award is given to the best newcomer in the field of Kalpabigyan by Pratisruti.

=== Awards and recognitions ===
- Oxford Bookstore Book Cover Prize (2022) for Kankabati Kalpabigyan Lekheni, Edited by Yashodhara Ray Chaudhuri, Ankita and Dip Ghosh, designed by Ujjwal Ghosh
- Oxford Bookstore Book Cover Prize (2024) for Brave new World, translated by Sayak Dutta Chowdhury, designed by Ujjwal Ghosh and Byomkeshi Limerick, by Prasenjit Dasgupta, designed by Ujjwal Ghosh
- Kalpabiswa Publication was awarded the best small bookstall (2024) at International Kolkata Book Fair.

== KalpaDB ==
In 2026, the creators of Kalpabiswa launched KalpaDB, an open-source, community-driven digital database. The platform serves as a public repository dedicated to archiving, indexing, and cataloging Indian speculative fiction, including books, short stories, and magazines. Operating under a Creative Commons (CC BY-SA 4.0) license, the database allows researchers and readers to track publication histories, author bibliographies, and historical trends within Indian science fiction and fantasy literature.
