= The Da Vinci Code (film) =

2006 mystery thriller film by Ron Howard

- Theatrical release poster
- Directed by: Ron Howard
- Screenplay by: Akiva Goldsman
- Based on: The Da Vinci Code by Dan Brown
- Produced by: Brian Grazer; Ron Howard; John Calley
- Starring: Tom Hanks; Audrey Tautou; Ian McKellen; Alfred Molina; Jürgen Prochnow; Paul Bettany; Jean Reno
- Cinematography: Salvatore Totino
- Edited by: Dan Hanley; Mike Hill
- Music by: Hans Zimmer
- Production companies: Columbia Pictures; Imagine Entertainment; Skylark Productions
- Distributed by: Sony Pictures Releasing (worldwide); Gaumont Columbia TriStar Films (France)
- Release dates: May 17, 2006 (Cannes); May 19, 2006 (United States, Malta and United Kingdom)
- Running time: 149 minutes
- Countries: United States; Malta; France; United Kingdom
- Languages: English; French; Latin; Spanish
- Budget: $125 million
- Box office: $801.3 million (Note: Initially grossed $760 million, it gained an additional $41.3 million in a 2025 release. This would make the final total of $801.3 million)

The Da Vinci Code is a 2006 mystery thriller film directed by Ron Howard, written by Akiva Goldsman, and based on Dan Brown's 2003 novel of the same name. The first in the Robert Langdon film series, the film stars Tom Hanks, Audrey Tautou, Ian McKellen, Alfred Molina, Jürgen Prochnow, Jean Reno, and Paul Bettany.

In the film, Robert Langdon, a professor of religious symbology from Harvard University, is the prime suspect in the grisly and unusual murder of Louvre curator Jacques Saunière. On the body, the police find a disconcerting cipher and start an investigation. Langdon escapes with the assistance of police cryptologist Sophie Neveu, and they begin a quest for the legendary Holy Grail. Sir Leigh Teabing, a noted British Grail historian, tells them that the actual Holy Grail is explicitly encoded in Leonardo da Vinci's wall painting The Last Supper. Also searching for the Grail is a secret cabal within Opus Dei, an actual prelature of the Holy See, who wish to keep the true Grail a secret to prevent the destruction of Christianity.

The film, like the book, was considered controversial. It was met with especially harsh criticism by the Catholic Church for the accusation that it is behind a two-thousand-year-old cover-up concerning what the Holy Grail really is and the concept that Jesus Christ and Mary Magdalene were married, producing a daughter, as well as its treatment of the organizations Priory of Sion and Opus Dei. Many members urged the laity to boycott the film. In the book, Brown states that the Priory of Sion and "all descriptions of artwork, architecture, documents and secret rituals in this novel are accurate".

The Da Vinci Code premiered as the opening film of the 59th Cannes Film Festival on May 17, 2006, and was theatrically released in the United States on May 19. The film received mixed reviews from critics, but was a commercial success, grossing $224 million in its worldwide opening weekend and an initial total of $760 million worldwide against a $125 million production budget, becoming the second-highest-grossing film of 2006, as well as Howard's highest-grossing film to date. It was followed by two sequels, both directed by Howard: Angels & Demons (2009) and Inferno (2016).

== Plot ==
Louvre curator Jacques Saunière is pursued by Silas, an albino Catholic monk who demands the location of the "keystone" to find and destroy the Holy Grail. Saunière gives him a false lead and is murdered. The police find his body posed like Da Vinci's Vitruvian Man. Police captain Bezu Fache summons Robert Langdon, an American symbologist who is in Paris for a lecture on the interpretation of symbols, to examine Saunière's body.

Langdon is shown the body and a secret message, readable only by UV light. It contains an out-of-order Fibonacci sequence. Police cryptographer Sophie Neveu, Saunière's granddaughter, says that Fache planted a tracker on him after finding the words "P.S. Find Robert Langdon" at the end of Saunière's secret message. Fache believes that Langdon murdered Saunière. Sophie throws away the tracker, distracting the police while they sneak around the Louvre, finding more clues in Leonardo da Vinci's works. Langdon deduces that Saunière was the grand master of the Priory of Sion.

Silas works for an anonymous person referred to as "The Teacher", along with members of Opus Dei, led by Bishop Aringarosa. He travels to the church as directed by Saunière and finds a marker with "Job 38:11" inscribed in it, the bible verse that begins, "Here you shall come, and no farther..." Enraged, he kills the nun in residence.

Langdon and Sophie travel to a French bank to access Saunière's safe deposit box, using the Fibonacci sequence. Inside is a cryptex, a cylindrical container that contains a message on papyrus. It can only be opened without destroying the contents by turning dials to spell a code word. As the police arrive, bank manager Andre Vernet helps Langdon and Sophie escape, then attempts to steal the cryptex and murder them. Langdon and Sophie escape with it.

They visit Langdon's friend, Sir Leigh Teabing, a Holy Grail expert. He claims that the Grail is not a cup but instead is Mary Magdalene. He says that she was not a prostitute but the wife of Jesus Christ. He believes Mary was pregnant during Jesus' crucifixion, and the Priory was formed to protect their descendants. The Opus Dei have been trying to destroy the Grail to preserve the Vatican's credibility. Later, Silas appears, but Teabing disables him by striking the leg bound by a cilice, in deference to Christ's torture.

The group escapes to London using Teabing's private plane, along with his butler, Remy Jean. Their interpretation of a clue hidden in the cryptex box leads them to the Temple Church, where they find nothing. Remy, claiming to be the Teacher, frees Silas.

Remy takes Teabing hostage, dumping him in the car trunk, and taking Silas to hide in an Opus Dei safe house. Teabing, the actual Teacher, later poisons Remy and sends the police after Silas. Police shoot Silas after he accidentally wounds Aringarosa, who is arrested by Fache, who resents being used to hunt Langdon.

Teabing, wanting to bring down the Church for centuries of persecution and deceit, confronts Langdon and Sophie. Now understanding the true meaning behind the clue to unlocking the cryptex, the trio goes to Westminster Abbey to Isaac Newton's tomb, a former grand master of the Priory. Teabing demands the pair opens the cryptex. Langdon tries and seemingly fails before tossing it into the air. Teabing dives for and catches it, but the vial breaks and the papyrus is thought destroyed.

The police arrive to arrest Teabing, who realizes Langdon must have solved the cryptex's code and removed the papyrus before throwing it. The code was "APPLE", after the apocryphal story of the apple which led Newton to discover his law of universal gravitation. The clue inside the cryptex, which tells of the Grail hiding "'neath the rose", leads Langdon and Sophie to Rosslyn Chapel in Scotland.

Inside the chapel, they find a secret room where Magdalene's tomb has been removed. Langdon, after searching through documents, realizes that Sophie's family died in a car crash, that Saunière was not her grandfather but her protector, and that she is the last descendant of Christ. The two are greeted by members of the Priory, including Sophie's grandmother, who promises to protect her. Langdon and Sophie part ways, the former returning to Paris.

While shaving, Langdon cuts himself and has an epiphany when his blood curves down the sink, reminding him of the Rose Line. Realizing the true meaning of the cryptex clue, he follows the line to the Louvre, concluding that the Grail is hidden below the Pyramide Inversée. Langdon kneels atop it; Mary Magdalene's sarcophagus is in a secret underground chamber.

== Cast ==
- Tom Hanks as Robert Langdon
- Audrey Tautou as Sophie Neveu / Princess Sophie Saint-Clair
- Ian McKellen as Sir Leigh Teabing
- Alfred Molina as Bishop Aringarosa
- Jürgen Prochnow as André Vernet
- Jean Reno as Police Captain Bezu Fache
- Paul Bettany as Silas
  - Hugh Mitchell as young Silas
- Étienne Chicot as Lieutenant Jérôme Collet
- Jean-Yves Berteloot as Remy Jean
- Jean-Pierre Marielle as Jacques Saunière
- Charlotte Graham as Mary Magdalene
- Seth Gabel as Michael the Cleric
- Marie-Françoise Audollent as Sister Sandrine
- Francesco Carnelutti as Prefect
- Rita Davies as Sophie's grandmother
- Denis Podalydès as Flight Controller
- Author Dan Brown and his wife make cameos (forefront) in the first scene of the book signing scene.
- The Templar Revelation authors Lynn Picknett and Clive Prince make a brief appearance as passengers on a bus.

Two actors, Sam Mancuso and Andre Lillis, are credited with playing the unnamed "Pope" character.

== Production ==
=== Development ===
The film rights to Dan Brown's novel The Da Vinci Code (2003) were purchased from Brown for $6 million. Bill Paxton was the director Ron Howard's first choice for the role of Robert Langdon, but had to decline as he was beginning filming for the television series Big Love. Howard approached Ricky Gervais for the role of Remy Jean, but he turned it down due to the fear of him ruining the film. Akiva Goldsman wrote the screenplay for the film, Goldsman previously worked with Howard on A Beautiful Mind (2001) and Cinderella Man (2005).

=== Filming ===
Filming had been scheduled to start in May 2005; however, some delays caused filming to begin on June 30, 2005.

The filmmakers shot many of the inside scenes at Pinewood Studios; the opening sequence in the cavernous 007 Stage at Pinewood Shepperton, where the interior of the Louvre was re-created. In this sequence, Hanks' character is taken by French police to the Louvre, where a dead body has been discovered. David White of Altered States FX, a prosthetics and special make-up effects company, was tasked with creating a naked photorealistic silicone body for the scene. Lighting effects were used to obscure the body's genitalia; a technique also used on television programs such as NCIS.

Pinewood's state-of-the-art Underwater Stage was used to film underwater sequences. The stage opened in 2005 after four years of planning and development. The water in the tank is filtered using an ultraviolet system, which creates crystal clear water, and the water is maintained at 30 °C (86 °F) to create a comfortable environment to work in for both cast and crew.

Alternative versions of Bettany's nude flagellation scenes were shot, in which he wears a black loincloth. Clips of these versions appear in the History Channel's Opus Dei Unveiled documentary, broadcast in summer 2006.

=== Location ===
The Louvre gave permission to film relevant scenes on its premises. A replica of the Mona Lisa was used during filming as the crew was not allowed to illuminate the original work with its lighting. During the on-site filming at the Louvre, the Mona Lisa's chamber was used as a storage room. Westminster Abbey denied the use of its premises, as did the church of Saint-Sulpice. The Westminster Abbey scenes were instead filmed at Lincoln and Winchester cathedrals, which both belong to the Church of England (Westminster Abbey is a Royal Peculiar, a church or chapel under the direct jurisdiction of the monarch, while Saint-Sulpice is a Roman Catholic institution).

Due to the denial of a location permit for Saint-Sulpice, the entire scene had to be re-created virtually by post-production company Rainmaker U.K. and though the set had been partially built, the coordinates were centimeters out from what the compositors had expected and so the entire process was extremely difficult to complete.

Lincoln Cathedral reportedly received £100,000 in exchange for the right to film there; filming took place August 15–19, 2005, mainly within the cloisters of the cathedral. The cathedral's bell, which strikes the hour, was silent for the first time since World War II during that time. Although it remained a closed set, protesters led by a 61-year-old woman named Sister Mary Michael demonstrated against the filming. She spent 12 hours praying on her knees outside the cathedral in protest against what she saw as the blasphemous use of a holy place to film a book containing heresy.

Winchester Cathedral answered criticism by using its location fee to fund an exhibition, lecture series, and campaign to debunk the book. The scenes for the Pope's summer residence, Castel Gandolfo, were filmed on location at Belvoir Castle in Leicestershire, England.

Shoreham Airport in West Sussex, England, was used as a filming location, with its art-deco terminal building used in a night shoot for the scenes at Le Bourget Airport.

Filming also took place elsewhere in the United Kingdom. Locations included the King's College London campus, Fairfield Halls (Croydon), the Temple Church (London), Burghley House (Lincolnshire) and Rosslyn Chapel and Rosslyn Castle (Midlothian, Scotland) make an appearance at the final part of the film.

== Music ==
The film's music was composed by Hans Zimmer, whose work resulted in a nomination for the 2007 Golden Globe Award for Best Original Score.

== Release ==
The Da Vinci Code premiered at the Cannes Film Festival on May 17, 2006. According to the Associated Press, the film received negative reactions from critics at the festival. A line spoken by Tom Hanks "drew prolonged laughter and some catcalls", and near the end of the screening, "there were a few whistles and hisses, and there was none of the scattered applause even bad films sometimes receive at Cannes".

=== Marketing ===
The film's teaser trailer was released in May 2005, a year before the film's worldwide release and prior to the start of filming.

A cross-promotion appeared on The Amazing Race 9, where one team earned a trip to the film's premiere in Hollywood, California. However, as a result of scheduling conflicts after the season finale aired, the team was unable to attend the premiere of the film, which had moved from Hollywood to the Cannes Film Festival.

== Reception ==
=== Critical response ===
On the review aggregator website Rotten Tomatoes, 25% of 231 critics' reviews are positive, with an average rating of 4.8/10. The website's consensus reads: "What makes Dan Brown's novel a best seller is evidently not present in this dull and bloated film adaptation of The Da Vinci Code." Metacritic, which uses a weighted average, assigned the film a score of 46 out of 100, based on 40 critics, indicating "mixed or average" reviews. Audiences polled by CinemaScore gave the film an average grade of "B+" on an A+ to F scale.

The film was poorly received at the Cannes Film Festival, where it debuted. Michael Medved gave the film a negative review, calling it an attack on religion. Anthony Lane of The New Yorker addressed the concerns of Catholics in his film review, stating that the film "is self-evident, spirit-lowering tripe that could not conceivably cause a single member of the flock to turn aside from the faith". In his Movie Guide, Leonard Maltin called the film "a letdown in every respect". Director Howard noted that the overwhelmingly negative reviews were "frustrating" to him.

Conversely, Roger Ebert of the Chicago Sun-Times (who had spoken very negatively of the novel) gave the film three out of four stars, writing, "The movie works; it's involving, intriguing and constantly seems on the edge of startling revelations." Of the storyline, he also commented, "Yes, the plot is absurd, but then most movie plots are absurd. That's what we pay to see." Lawrence Toppman of The Charlotte Observer, who also liked the film, gave it three and a half out of four stars and noted, "unlike most Hollywood blockbusters, this one assumes audience members will be smart".

Although many critics gave mixed to negative reviews of the film, critics praised the performances of McKellen as well as Bettany.

On the "Worst Movies of 2006" episode of the television show Ebert & Roeper (January 13, 2007), guest critic Michael Phillips (sitting in for the recovering Roger Ebert) listed the film at No. 2. The film earned a Razzie Award nomination for Ron Howard as Worst Director but lost to M. Night Shyamalan for Lady in the Water.

=== Box office ===
==== Opening weekend ====
The film opened with an estimated $31 million in box office sales on its opening day, averaging $7,764 per screen. During its opening weekend, moviegoers spent an estimated $77 million in the United States and Canada, and $224 million worldwide. The Da Vinci Code is the best domestic opening for both Tom Hanks and Ron Howard.

It also enjoyed the third biggest opening weekend for that year (after Pirates of the Caribbean: Dead Man's Chest and X-Men: The Last Stand, and the second biggest worldwide opening weekend ever, just behind Star Wars: Episode III – Revenge of the Sith (2005).) This event has led some critics, particularly in the United Kingdom, to moot the idea of the "critic-proof film".

==== Ranking and gross ====
The Da Vinci Code debuted at number one at the North American box office, grossing more than $111 million in its first week. On June 20, it became the second film of 2006 to pass the $200 million mark in North America. It had the fifth-highest gross of 2006 in the United States and Canada and grossed $758 million worldwide—the second-highest total of 2006. Its worldwide total made it the 21st highest-grossing film of all time at the time, and the highest-grossing film in the franchise. It also surpassed the 12-year-old record of Forrest Gump as the highest-grossing film of Tom Hanks's career; it was surpassed by Toy Story 3 in 2010.

== Censorship ==
The film was banned in a number of countries, including Syria, Belarus, and Lebanon. In Jordan, authorities banned the film claiming it "tarnishes the memory of Christian and Islamic figures and contradicts the truth as written in the Bible and the Quran about Jesus". In Iran, it was banned due to protests by Muslims and Christian minorities.

=== Australia ===
The film was not banned in Australia, and has been classified M (Mature) by the Australian Classification Board (ACB). However, one cinema, The Entrance Cinema in the suburb of The Entrance on the New South Wales Central Coast, refused to screen the film due to its depiction of the Catholic Church. Then-cinema manager Denton Wright said that the ban reflected the beliefs of the cinema's owners, a small Catholic family with socially conservative religious views. However, Apostolic Nuncio Archbishop Ambrose De Paoli stated that he did not believe the film would change people's perceptions of Christianity, and that it may "awaken people's curiosity" about the religion, "which may be a positive thing".

=== China ===
Although The Da Vinci Code was passed by Chinese censors, it was abruptly removed by authorities from public view in mainland China, after "a remarkable run ... grossing over $13 million", because of protests by Chinese Catholic groups.

=== Egypt ===
Both the book and the film were banned in Egypt due to pressure from Coptic Christians. Some Muslims compared the film to the Danish cartoons that had caused controversy earlier that year. Hafez Abu Saeda, of the Egyptian Organization for Human Rights, said, "This violates freedom of thought and belief..... This is fiction. It's art, and it should be regarded as art."

=== Faroe Islands ===
The biggest cinema in the Faroe Islands, Havnar Bio, decided to boycott the film, effectively blocking it from the other smaller cinemas, which rely on second-hand films from this source. Its CEO, Jákup Eli Jacobsen, said that he "fears losing the operating license if it exhibits blasphemy in the cinema".

A private initiative by the individual Herluf Sørensen arranged the film to be played, despite the boycott by Havnar Bio. The film played at the Nordic House in the Faroe Islands on June 8 and 9, 2006.

=== India ===
There was a huge outcry in many states by the Christian and the Muslim minorities to ban the film from screening in India for its perceived anti-Christian message. Possibly the largest reaction occurred in Kolkata, where a group of around 25 protesters "stormed" Crossword bookstore, pulled copies of the book from the racks and threw them to the ground. On the same day, a group of 50–60 protesters successfully made the Oxford Bookstore on Park Street decide to stop selling the book "until the controversy sparked by the film's release was resolved.

The film was allowed to be released without any cuts but with an A (Adults Only) certification from the Central Board for Film Certification and a 15-second disclaimer added at the end stating that the film was purely a work of fiction. The Supreme Court of India also rejected petitions calling for a ban on the film, saying the plot which suggested Jesus was married was fictional and not offensive.

The film was totally banned in some states with significant Muslim and Christian populations such as Punjab, Lakshadweep, Goa, Meghalaya, Nagaland, Mizoram, Jammu and Kashmir, Tamil Nadu and Andhra Pradesh. The Andhra Pradesh High Court subsequently reversed the State Government's order banning the screening of the film in the state; the State Government had previously banned the film based on the objections lodged by Christians and Muslims.

=== Pakistan ===
Pakistan banned The Da Vinci Code for showing what officials called blasphemous material about Jesus. Christian groups, along with the Muttahida Majlis-e-Amal, held protests against the film calling for a global ban.

=== Philippines ===
The Philippine Alliance Against Pornography (PAAP) appealed to then Philippine President Gloria Macapagal Arroyo to stop the showing of The Da Vinci Code in the Philippines. They branded the film "the most pornographic and blasphemous film in history" and also requested the help of Pope Benedict XVI, the Catholic Bishops Conference of the Philippines and other religious groups to stop the showing of the film.

However, Cecille Guidote Alvarez, Philippine Presidential Adviser on Culture and the Arts, said the Philippine government would not interfere in the controversy about the film and would leave the decision to the Movie and Television Review and Classification Board's rating. Eventually, MTRCB decided to give The Da Vinci Code an R-18 rating (restricted to those 18 years of age and above) despite PAAP's opposition to showing it.

=== Samoa ===
The film was banned outright in the Independent State of Samoa after church leaders watching a pre-release showing filed a complaint with film censors.

=== Solomon Islands ===
The prime minister of Solomon Islands, Manasseh Sogavare, said he would seek to have the film banned in his country, as it might threaten the Solomons' predominantly Christian faith. "We profess Christian religion in the country, and that film that depicts some thoughts about this person called Jesus Christ that Christians adore as not only as a good man, but was himself God, and such a film basically undermines the very roots of Christianity in Solomon Islands."

=== Sri Lanka ===
Sri Lanka also banned the film from being released. It was banned by presidential order of Mahinda Rajapaksa after the Catholic Bishops Conference made an appeal through an epistle.

=== Thailand ===
Christian groups in this mostly Buddhist country protested against the film and called for it to be banned. On May 16, 2006, the Thai Censorship Committee issued a ruling that the film could be shown, but that the last 10 minutes would be cut. Also, some Thai subtitles were to be edited to change their meaning and passages from the Bible would also be quoted at the beginning and end of the film.

However, on the following day, Sony Pictures appealed against the ruling, saying it would pull the film if the decision to cut it was not reversed. The censorship panel then voted 6–5 that the film could be shown uncut, but that a disclaimer would precede and follow the film, saying it was a work of fiction.

== Protests and other reactions ==
There were protesters at several film theaters across the United States on the opening weekend protesting about the themes of the film, calling it blasphemy and claiming that it shamed both the Catholic Church and Jesus Christ Himself. More than 200 protesters also turned out in Athens, Greece, to protest against the film's release shortly before opening day. In Manila, the film was banned from all theaters by the local MTRCB as an R18 film for the Philippines. In Pittsburgh, protesters also showed up at a special screening of the film the day before its widespread release. Protests also occurred at the filming sites, but only a monk and a nun stood in a quiet protest at the Cannes premiere. In Chennai, India, the film was banned for two months as a precaution against possible communal tensions.

=== The Vatican ===
At a conference on April 28, 2006, the secretary of the Congregation for the Doctrine of the Faith, a Vatican curial department, Archbishop Angelo Amato specifically called for a boycott of the film. He said that the film was "full of calumnies, offences, and historical and theological errors".

Cardinal Francis Arinze, in a documentary called The Da Vinci Code: A Masterful Deception, urged unspecified legal action against the makers of the film. He was formerly Prefect of the Congregation for Divine Worship and the Discipline of the Sacraments in the Vatican.

=== Opus Dei ===
Stating that it does not intend to organize any boycotts, Opus Dei (the Catholic organization that is featured prominently in the novel and the film) released a statement on February 14, 2006, asking Sony Pictures to consider editing the soon-to-be-released film so that it would not contain references that it felt might be hurtful to Catholics. The statement also said Brown's book offers a "deformed" image of the church and that Opus Dei will use the opportunity of the film's release to educate about the church.

On Easter, April 16, 2006, Opus Dei published an open letter by its Japanese Information Office mildly proposing that Sony Pictures consider including a disclaimer on the film adaptation as a "sign of respect towards the figure of Jesus Christ, the history of the Church, and the religious beliefs of viewers". The organization also encouraged the studio to label the film as fictitious clearly "and that any resemblance to reality is pure coincidence."

According to a statement by Manuel Sánchez Hurtado, Opus Dei Press Office Rome, in contrast to Sony Corporation's published "Code of Conduct", the company had announced that the film would not include such a disclaimer.

=== American Catholic bishops ===
U.S. Catholic bishops launched a website, JesusDecoded.com, refuting the critical claims in the novel that were about to be brought to the screen. The bishops were concerned about what they said were errors and serious misstatements in The Da Vinci Code. The film has also been rated morally offensive by the United States Conference of Catholic Bishops' Office for Film and Broadcasting, which denounced its depiction of both the Jesus–Mary Magdalene relationship and that of Opus Dei as "deeply abhorrent".

=== Peru ===
The Peruvian Episcopal Conference declared the film — and the book — as part of a "systematic attack on the Catholic Church". Furthermore, the Archbishop of Lima, the Cardinal and member of Opus Dei Juan Luis Cipriani, urged his community not to see the film. "If someone goes (to see the film), they are giving money to those who hurt the faith. It's not a problem of fiction; if truth is not respected, what arises we could call white glove terrorism."

=== People with albinism ===
The National Organization for Albinism and Hypopigmentation (NOAH) as well as individuals with albinism have criticized the film's perpetuation of unrealistic and negative stereotypes about people with albinism with the character Silas, citing a long-standing trend of the film industry of depicting albinos as villains.

=== Cast response ===
==== Tom Hanks' response ====
Hanks told the Evening Standard that those involved with the film "always knew there would be a segment of society that would not want this film to be shown. But the story we tell is loaded with all sorts of hooey and fun kind of scavenger-hunt-type nonsense". He said it was a mistake "to take any sort of film at face value, particularly a huge-budget motion picture like this."

He also said at the Cannes Film Festival that he and his wife saw no contradiction between their faith and the film, as "My heritage, and that of my wife, suggests that our sins have been taken away, not our brains."

==== Ian McKellen's response ====
Also at Cannes, McKellen was quoted as saying, "While I was reading the book, I believed it entirely. Clever Dan Brown twisted my mind convincingly. But when I put it down, I thought, 'What a load of [pause] potential codswallop."

During a May 17, 2006, interview on The Today Show with the Da Vinci Code cast and director, Matt Lauer posed a question to the group about how they would have felt if the film had borne a prominent disclaimer that it is a work of fiction, as some religious groups wanted. (Some high-ranking Vatican cabinet members had called for a boycott of the film.) McKellen responded, "I've often thought the Bible should have a disclaimer in the front saying 'This is fiction.' I mean, walking on water? It takes... an act of faith. And I have faith in this film—not that it's true, not that it's factual, but that it's a jolly good story... And I think audiences are clever enough and bright enough to separate out fact and fiction, and discuss the thing when they've seen it."

== Accolades ==
Award	Category	Recipient(s) and nominee(s)	Result
64th Golden Globe Awards	Best Original Score	Hans Zimmer	Nominated
12th Critics' Choice Awards	Best Composer	Hans Zimmer	Nominated
49th Annual Grammy Awards	Best Score Soundtrack	Hans Zimmer	Nominated
33rd People's Choice Awards	Favorite Movie Drama	The Da Vinci Code	Nominated
27th Golden Raspberry Awards	Worst Director	Ron Howard	Nominated
11th Satellite Awards	Best Original Score	Hans Zimmer	Nominated
11th Satellite Awards	Best Visual Effects	Kevin Ahern	Nominated
11th Satellite Awards	Best Sound	Anthony J. Ciccolini III, Kevin O'Connell, and Greg P. Russell	Nominated
11th Satellite Awards	Best DVD Extras	The Da Vinci Code	Nominated
2006 Teen Choice Awards	Choice Movie: Villain	Ian McKellen	Nominated

== Home media ==
The Da Vinci Code was released on DVD on November 14, 2006, in four editions:

1. A two-disc release in both widescreen and fullscreen.
2. A Target-widescreen exclusive release, along with a History Channel documentary.
3. A Walmart-exclusive three-disc release in both widescreen and fullscreen containing a bonus disc about the paintings and props used in the film, along with how the book was adapted to the screen.
4. A "special edition gift set" that includes a two-disc DVD set, working cryptex, and replica Robert Langdon journal.

All DVD sets include an introduction from director Howard, ten featurettes and other bonus features. The film was also released on UMD for the Sony PlayStation Portable on November 14, 2006.

In Hong Kong and Korea (Region 3), Australia, New Zealand, Spain and Latin America (DVD region code 4), a version of the two-disc set included an extended edition of the film, featuring over twenty-five minutes of extra footage, bringing the running time to 174 minutes. However, there is no regular DVD release of the extended version in the United States or United Kingdom.

On April 28, 2009, a two-disc Blu-ray edition of the extended version of the film was released in North America.

On October 11, 2016, a 4K Ultra HD Blu-ray edition was released.

A limited edition 4K Ultra HD Blu-ray Steelbook was released on May 19, 2026 to celebrate the film's 20th Anniversary. The Steelbook features both the theatrical and extended versions of the film.

== Sequels ==
=== Angels & Demons ===
The screenwriter Akiva Goldsman, with the help of the Jurassic Park screenwriter David Koepp, adapted Angels & Demons (a 2000 Dan Brown novel published six years before The Da Vinci Code) into a film script, which was also directed by Howard. Chronologically, the story takes place before The Da Vinci Code. However, the filmmakers re-tooled it as a sequel. Hanks reprises his role as Langdon in the film, which was released in May 2009 to moderate (but generally better) reviews.

=== Inferno ===
Sony Pictures produced a film adaptation of Inferno, the fourth book in the Robert Langdon series, which was released in October 2016 with Howard as director, David Koepp adapting the screenplay and Hanks reprising his role as Robert Langdon. Filming began on April 27, 2015, in Venice, Italy, and finished on July 21, 2015. On December 2, 2014, Felicity Jones was in early talks to star in the film. The Bollywood actor Irrfan Khan was cast as The Provost. The Danish actress Sidse Babett Knudsen was added to the cast as Elizabeth Sinskey.

== See also ==
- Robert Langdon (franchise)
- The Da Vinci Code WebQuests
- The Da Vinci Code (video game)
- The Da Vinci Treasure – A mockbuster produced by The Asylum
- Cultural references to Leonardo da Vinci
- National Treasure - film about the Knights Templar Treasure

== Sources ==
The following are reference sources, repeated in alphabetic order:

- Larry Carroll: "Ian McKellen Sticks Up For Evil In Da Vinci Code, X-Men" [6], MTV News, May 15, 2006.
- Catholic World News, "Reaffirm the Resurrection, Pope urges faithful", Catholic World News, May 1, 2006.
- CNN, "'Da Vinci Code' a hot ticket", CNN, May 21, 2006 (webpage expired).
- CNN, "'Da Vinci Code' opens with estimated $29 million", CNN, May 20, 2006 (webpage expired).
- DPA, "Hundreds of Greek Orthodox march to protest Da Vinci Code movie", Deutsche Presse-Agentur, May 16, 2006.
- Fretland, Katie, "Fire chars British set of new Bond movie"' July 30, 2006, webpage: WHAS11-DVC: Louvre interior set filmed at Pinewood.
- Sánchez Hurtado, Manuel, The Other Code, Opus Dei Press Office, May 17, 2006.
- KDKA News, "Locals Protest 'Da Vinci Code' Movie", KDKA News, May 19, 2006.
- Leonardo da Vinci, Mona Lisa (La Gioconda) painting, 1503–1507, in Louvre Museum.
- Pinewood Shepperton studios, "Gordon Brown Opens Underwater Stage at Pinewood Studios", May 19, 2006, webpage: PinewoodShep-Stage.
- Philip Pullella, "Boycott Da Vinci Code film", Reuters, April 28, 2006, web: ScotsmanVatDVC. Retrieved August 22, 2006.
- "Ian McKellen Unable to Suspend Disbelief While Reading the Bible", US Weekly, May 17, 2006 (has video clip).
