= Professor Nat Boltu Chakra: Moner Machine =

Moner Machine ("The Machine of the Mind") is one of the most prominent short stories in the series Professor Nat Boltu Chakra, written by Adrish Bardhan, one of the most prolific writers in the genre of Bengali science fiction or Kalpabigyan. The series revolves around the exciting scientific experiments and expeditions done by the duo Professor Nat Boltu and his student and favored 'Watson' like companion Dinanath Nath alias Dinana. The series has been written from the late 1960s to 2008.

== Author ==
Adrish Bardhan (1932–2019) was one of the most prolific contributors to the genre of fiction in Bangla, encompassing science fiction, horror, detective/thriller fiction through over two hundred titles of translations, adaptations, and original works. He coined the term 'Kalpabigyan'. After graduating with a BSc from the University of Calcutta, he moved to Bombay for work, influenced by Sibram Chakrabarti’s novel ‘Bari Theke Paliye' (Running Away from Home). Bardhan held various jobs across the country before returning to Kolkata in the early ’60s. He started his career under the pseudonym Akash Sen and also coined the term Kalpabigyan for science fiction in 1962. He also edited major SF magazines during the 1960s–80s: Aschorjo (1963–1968), Fantastic (1975–1976), and Bisway (1982).

"Moner Machine"
- Short Story by Adrish Bardhan
- Country: India
- Language: Bengali
- Genre: Science Fiction

Publication
- Publication type: Magazines
- Publisher: Ananda Publisher
- Media type: Hardcover
- Publication date: 2009, reprint 2013

Chronology
- Series: Nat Boltu Chakra Sangraha Volume 1
Kalo Tham	Cosmic Kuasha

== Publication History ==
Evidence from paratextual materials suggests that Bardhan initiated the Nat Boltu Chakra series in the late 1960s. He subsequently published numerous stories annually, primarily in periodicals such as Kishor Bharati and Kishor Gyan-Bigyan, as well as in the pujabarshiki (annual Durga Puja magazines) of Dev Sahitya Kutir and later, Shuktara. The comprehensive two-volume collection of the Nat Boltu Chakra series, published by Ananda Publishers, spans over 1500 pages and comprises a total of 91 short stories and novellas (Ananda, 2009 and 2013, with subsequent reprints). However, specific publication details are documented for only approximately 30 of these individual works. The short story titled 'Moner Machine' is included in Volume 1 of the Professor Nat Boltu Chakra Sangraha, also published by Ananda Publishers. Within this volume, it is positioned as the seventh story, following 'Kalo Tham' (Black Pillar) and preceding 'Cosmic kuasha' (Cosmic Fog). In the prefaces of both volumes, Bardhan offered an apology for the omission of precise publication data, attributing it to personal circumstances.

== Plot Summary ==
The narrative centers on three individuals: Professor Nat Boltu, a scientist; his associate, Dinanath; and another scientist, Doctor Bramhabid. Doctor Bramhabid developed an innovation known as the 'Guided Genetic System,' abbreviated as G.G.S. While his prior experiments with this system on animals such as rats and monkeys yielded positive outcomes, he had yet to conduct human trials. For this crucial human experimentation, he selected Dinanath as his test subject. Dinanath, who also serves as the narrator, acknowledges the dedication evident in the animal trials but simultaneously points out their inherent cruelty. The story then shifts to Doctor Bramhabid's ambition to embark on an expedition to the planet Venus.

Despite considerable reluctance, Dinanath ultimately consented to participate in this expedition, succumbing to the persistent encouragement and psychological influence exerted by his professor and doctor, Bramhabid. Within the narrative, the doctor elucidates a process wherein an individual's chromosomes would undergo continuous alteration, directed by their willpower or desires. This phenomenon, which Professor Nat Boltu terms the creation of a 'super creature,' would enable a transformation of appearance and personality akin to that of a superhero, compressing evolutionary changes that typically span millennia into an instantaneous process.

Doctor Bramhabid rendered Dinanath mute to enable him to achieve inner tranquility under the exceptionally challenging conditions of Venus. The doctor posited that individuals must, through sheer willpower, adapt themselves to any given circumstance. This particular line of inquiry was designated as 'Human Mutation Genetics.' Within his laboratory, he engineered a diverse array of genes that were responsive to the brain's bioelectrical currents. He elucidated these concepts by referencing his publication, 'Directed Biocurrent Mutagenesis with Guided Genetic System'.

Human willpower is remarkably potent from birth, with every molecule of the human body imbued with primordial energy. Harnessing this substantial energy allowed Dinanath to endure the challenging conditions on Venus. His physical form underwent a significant transformation, developing an enormous size and a texture akin to tree bark. G.G.S. equipped him with formidable claws and octopus-like appendages. During an encounter with a native Venusian creature, Dinanath found himself in the role of the alien. Crucially, from the spaceship's control cabin, the professor and doctor continuously guided Dinanath to alter his shape, not impulsively, but with deliberate control to maintain their communication link. Furthermore, Dinanath was tasked with conducting scientific research on Venus. Under the scientists' direction, he proved unstoppable, exploring the planet's every corner and crevice, undeterred by any obstacles.

Despite their profound understanding of the potential psychological ramifications of such immense power, particularly its tendency to foster extreme arrogance when unchecked, the scientists deliberately incorporated specific chromosomal safeguards embedded inside Dinanath’s body. These measures were intended to ensure his continued restraint. Ultimately, Dinanath's reflections underscore the extraordinary resilience of humanity, positing that individuals possess the inherent capacity to dominate the universe by harnessing the potent force of their intellect and willpower.

He returned to this verdant world in his original form. However, the profound shock he experienced meant he remained unable to speak even after his return from Venus. His voice was only restored when the two scientists exclaimed "Bravo, Bravo" close to his ears.

== Characters ==
In all the short stories the character of Nat Boltu Chakra and Dinanath Nath- is constant, Along with that many new characters appear. Like in the short story Moner Machine the character of Doctor Bramhabid appears.

Nat Boltu Chakra- Nat Boltu Chakra is 80 years old and 'tall for a Bengali man' at 5’9”, with 'broken, stubbly cheeks, toothless gums, bald head (and) a half-crazy appearance' that “generates immediate laughter".. Always dressed in stained and disheveled dhuti-panjabi, the pre-colonial Bengali attire for men, he is prone to bouts of anger and shouting and well exemplifies the “thorny on the outside, soft on the inside” hero type without being hypermasculine. Even though he is frail and tires easily, he never fails in courage, often putting his own life on the line. The power of his “world-famous Bengali brain” is unparalleled in the very universe (as attested by various alien life-forms) and world organizations, be they military or scientific, are ever in need of his erratic but superior intellect and pioneering inventions.

Dinanath Nath- Dinanath Nath, his favored companion and the primary first-person narrator of the series with a 6’ 2” muscular yoga-powered frame comparable to the mythical Ashwatthama and anger like Shiva which once aroused knows no bounds. Dinanath is a very picture of youthful courage and stubbornness. Nat Boltu needs him to be his “hands and feet” and requires his assistance in practically every story. Dinanath repeatedly describes himself as unintelligent and this makes Nat Boltu scold him incessantly.

Doctor Bramhabid- Doctor Bramhabid's name is literally translated as 'the one who knows about the universe.' Not much information is given about his character, but he is an inventor who has invented ‘The Guided Genetic System,’ and he was researching 'Human Mutation Genetics.' To make his inventions successful, he tested them on animals and also, as a human participant, implemented them upon Dinanath.

== Genre ==
In the preface of Volume 1 of Professor Nat Boltu Sangraha, published by Ananda Publishers, Bardhan clearly claims children as his audience and affirms that, just as ghost stories are not written for ghosts, his science fiction too is not written for scientists. He uses the analogy of a bitter pill (the science) coated with sugar (his fiction) to describe how he's adapted the genre for children. So, Nat Boltu Sangraha can be classified as Bengali science fiction stories for children and young adults.

== Series ==
Moner Machine is a short story that was anthologized in the series Nat Boltu Sangraha volume 1 series whose first edition was published in April, 2009 and was reprinted in 2013.

== Narrative Strategies ==
Most of the stories in the series are written in the first person, with some sections of narration in the third person, while Nat Boltu also presents epistolary first accounts in a few stories. The short story "Moner Machine" is written in third-person narration. Dinanath also takes the “dear reader" mode and frequently directly addresses the readers. He is also a writer like Boymkesh’s Ajit.

== Reference to Contemporary Bengali Science Fiction ==
'Tekka Dilen Professor' ('The Professor Scores a Point') opens with Dinanath’s self-reflexive lament about how his readers are convinced that he is, much like Giridhar from Premendra Mitra’s 'Mahakasher Atithi' ('Guests from Outer Space'), intoxicated by marijuana, since he records such far-fetched and implausible scientific adventures.

== Themes ==
The short story Moner Machine deals with the themes of augmentation or transmutation—bodily and genetic changes. The short story also explores the power of human will and the superiority of human beings. But it also warns us about the fatality of excessive power and the need to keep it in check. A few other stories in the Nat Boltu Chakra series dealing with similar themes are Molecule Manus, Cosmic Kuasha, to name a few.

== Series Reception ==
Bardhan’s creations, detective 'Indranath Rudra’ (13 volumes), lady detective ‘Narayani’ and ‘Professor Nut Boltu Chakra’ got huge popularity among the Bengali readers. (IE Bangla Web Desk, 2019). After that, his field began to expand. His mind wandered in the fields of science fiction, the occult, the supernatural, translation, etc.

== Bibliography ==
- Bardhan, Adrish. Professor Nat Boltu Chakra Akhanda Songoskoron, Ananda Publishers, April,2009, ISBN 978-81-7756-507-2.
