= Lynn Picknett =

English writer

Lynn Picknett (born 1947) is an English writer of books that are mainly about religious history and popular conspiracy theories, the paranormal, the occult, and historical mysteries.

== Biography ==
Born in Folkestone, Kent, England, in April 1947, Picknett grew up in an alleged haunted house in York, attending Park Grove Junior School and Queen Anne Grammar School. After graduating from university with an Upper 2nd (hons) degree in English Literature, she briefly became a teacher, a shop assistant, and a stand-up comic before moving to London in 1971 to join Marshall Cavendish Publications as a trainee sub-editor.

In the 1980s, Picknett was Deputy Editor on The Unexplained and contributor to many other publications. She was also a regular contributor on various radio shows, including Michael van Straten and Clive Bull's on LBC and Talk Radio. She was also a television presenter for both Anglia and Southern TV.

In 1990, Picknett was guest curator for the Royal Photographic Society's exhibition The Unexplained at Bath, performing the same function in 1999 for the National Museum of Photography, Film and Television at Bradford.

In the early 1990s, Picknett teamed up with fellow researcher and writer Clive Prince. Their first book, Turin Shroud: How Leonardo da Vinci Fooled History, claimed that the characteristics of the Shroud of Turin could be reproduced using only a pinhole camera (camera obscura) and that Leonardo da Vinci, in producing the image, used his own face for the model of Jesus. This is inconsistent with the first exhibition of the Shroud of Turin, authentic or not, in 1357, almost a century before Leonardo's birth. Picknett and Prince counter-argue that the relic predating Leonardo "was not the same one as today's."

The 1997 book The Templar Revelation by Picknett and Prince was credited by Dan Brown, both in The Da Vinci Code and in the 2006 court case (Baigent & Leigh v Random House), as the main inspiration for his novel.

Picknett and Prince perform most of the research for their books themselves, but also have collaborated with others. Between 1998 and 2003, they produced three books in partnership with researchers Stephen Prior and Robert Brydon, including Double Standards: The Rudolf Hess Cover-Up (2001). They have credited Keith Prince as a contributor to Turin Shroud, and Philip Coppens for help with The Stargate Conspiracy (1999), which they dedicated to him.

Picknett and Prince make a brief appearance in the film The Da Vinci Code. The pair appear on a London bus as the protagonists are travelling to the Temple Church, off Fleet Street in central London. Robert Langdon (Tom Hanks) leaves his seat to join Sophie (Audrey Tautou) at the back of the bus, and Picknett and Prince are seen sitting on the left.

== Works ==
Picknett is the co-author of:

- Encyclopedia of Dreams (1988) (with Anna Fornari and Emilio Rombaldini)
- Turin Shroud: In Whose Image? the Truth Behind the Centuries-Long Conspiracy of Silence (1994) (with Clive Prince)
- The Templar Revelation (1997) (with Clive Prince)
- Stargate Conspiracy: The Truth about Extraterrestrial Life and the Mysteries of Ancient Egypt (2001) (with Clive Prince)
- Double Standards: The Rudolf Hess Cover-Up (2002) (with Clive Prince and Stephen Prior)
- War of the Windsors: A Century of Unconstitutional Monarchy (2002) (with Clive Prince and Stephen Prior)
- Friendly Fire. The Secret War between the Allies (2004) (with Clive Prince and Stephen Prior)
- The Sion Revelation (2006) (with Clive Prince)
- The Masks of Christ: Behind the Lies and Cover-ups About the Man Believed to Be God (2008) (with Clive Prince)
- The Forbidden Universe (2011) (with Clive Prince)
- When God Had a Wife: The Fall and Rise of the Sacred Feminine in the Judeo-Christian Tradition (2019) (with Clive Prince)

Picknett is the author of:

- The Loch Ness Monster (Pitkin Guides)
- Royal Romance an Illustrated History of the Royal Love Affairs
- Mary Magdalene: Christianity's Hidden Goddess
- The Secret History of Lucifer
- Mammoth Book of UFOs
- Flights of Fancy? 100 Years of Paranormal Experiences
