= Adrish Bardhan =

Bengali writer (1932–2019)

- অদ্রীশ বর্ধন
- Born: 1 December 1932; Calcutta, Bengal Presidency, British India
- Died: 20 May 2019 (aged 86); Kolkata, West Bengal, India
- Education: Bachelor of Science
- Alma mater: University of Calcutta
- Occupations: Writer, Translator, Editor
- Writing career
- Pen name: Akash Sen
- Language: Bengali
- Genres: Science fiction, Detective fiction, Crime fiction, Horror Fiction
- Notable works: Professor Nutboltu Chakro; Aschorjo

Adrish Bardhan (Bengali: অদ্রীশ বর্ধন, Bengali pronunciation: [ɔdriʃ bɔrdʱɔn]; 1 December 1932 – 20 May 2019) was a Bengali Science fiction writer, editor and translator.

== Personal life ==
Bardhan was born on 1 December 1932 in Calcutta. He graduated with a Bachelor of Science degree from the University of Calcutta. He had served in several corporate roles before he shifted his focus to his literary career. He married in 1970. His son, Ambar Bardhan, was born in 1972. He died on 20 May 2019 at the age of 86.

== Literary Career ==
Bardhan played a pioneering role in popularising the Science fiction genre among the Bengali literary audience. He coined the term "kalpabigyan", which means Science fiction in Bengali. He started his literary career under the pseudonym "Akash Sen". His popular characters include Professor Nutboltu Chakro, a researcher with equal grasp across all scientific disciplines. The scientist is always accompanied by his assistant Dinonath Nath. The tales often feature futuristic depictions of human predicament and encourage readers to become environmentally aware. Some elements which appear in these tales are an erratic android robot, "the talking tree" and "dark energy". His Detective characters include Indranath Rudra, Father Ghyanshyam and lady detective Narayani, one of the fewest female detectives in Bengali literature. Other popular characters include the vagabond Chanokkyo Chakladar. Bardhan also wrote Crime fiction and Horror fiction. His translations of Sherlock Holmes and the works of Edgar Allan Poe are notable.

=== Magazines ===
In 1963, Bardhan founded Aschorjo, the first Bengali Science fiction magazine. The magazine ceased publication in 1969. Premendra Mitra and Satyajit Ray were closely associated with the magazine. Several earlier stories in the magazine were written by Bardhan himself under various pseudonyms. Other contributors include Ranen Ghosh, Enakkshi Chattopadhyay and Bishu Das. It featured short stories, serialised novellae, translations from Western Science fiction, book reviews and film reviews. He founded Fantastic magazine in 1975, which he co-edited with Ranen Ghosh. The magazine featured works of speculative fiction, Fantasy and Horror fiction alongside Science fiction in Bengali. Sunil Gangopadhyay, Shirshendu Mukhopadhyay and Syed Mustafa Siraj contributed to the magazine. It later became erratic and finally ceased publication in 2007. He edited Kishore Mon from 1984 to 1986. He edited the Kalpabiswa webzine in 2015.

=== Other Contributions ===
In 1965, Bardhan broadcast "Mahakashjatri Bangali" on All India Radio with Premendra Mitra and Dilip Roy Chowdhury. Satyajit Ray, Bardhan, Mitra and Roy Chowdhury created the radio drama "Sabuj Manush" which was broadcast in 1966. It featured distinct stories by each writer to form a shared literary universe. The work was later published in Betar Jagat magazine as the first Bengali anthological Science fiction.

The Science fiction Cine Club was conceptualized by Satyajit Ray with Bardhan and launched on 26 January 1966. The Club was first of its kind in India. Bardhan was the founder secretary of this venture .

Bardhan also undertook several publishing ventures to promote Science fiction.

== Notable Works ==
- Abar Sherlock Holmes (2007)
- Amar Maa Sob Jane (1992, 1995, 1996)
- Amanushiki (1984)
- Amar Maa Sob Jane (1992, 1995, 1996)
- Aschorjo Almari (2008)
- Asojhyo Suspense (2001, 2006, 2008)
- Atonko Omnibus (2006)
- Biswa Sera Science Fiction (2012)
- Case of Charles Dexter Ward (1976)
- Edgar Allan Poe-r Rachana Sangraha (3 volumes)
- ET (1985)
- Goyenda Indranath Rudra (13 volumes from 2002 to 2014)
- Jule Verne Samagra (2013, 2015, 2016, 2017)
- Kanya Tumi Ananya (2004)
- Kathasaritsagar
- Makorsha Atonko (2008)
- Meghdweeper Atonko (1996)
- Nitanka (2008)
- Paanchti Rahasya Upanyas (2004)
- Patay Patay Rahasya (1994)
- Professor Nutboltu Chakro Songroho (2009, 2013)
- Sherlock Holmes Samagra (2011, 2012)
- Sera Kalpabigyan Omnibus (2004)
- Sera Goyenda Upanyas - Indranath Rudra-r Chaarti Adventure (2016)
- Sera Aschorjo! Sera Fantastic (1994)
- Superman Bikramjit (2008)
- Tarzan Fire Elo (2006)

== Awards ==
- Dakshini Barta Best Story Award
- Dineshchandra Smriti Purashkar
- Kalpabiswa Sammanana
- Kishore Jnan-Bijnan Purashkar
- Moumachhi Smriti Purashkar
- Ranjit Smriti Purashkar
- Sudhindranath Raha Purashkar
