= The Alien (unproduced film) =

Unproduced Indian-American science fiction film

- Directed by: Satyajit Ray
- Written by: Satyajit Ray
- Based on: Bankubabur Bandhu by Satyajit Ray
- Starring: Peter Sellers; Marlon Brando
- Music by: Satyajit Ray
- Production company: Columbia Pictures
- Distributed by: Columbia Pictures
- Countries: India; United States
- Language: English

The Alien was an unproduced Indian-American science fiction film in development in the late 1960s which was eventually cancelled. It was to be directed by Indian filmmaker Satyajit Ray and co-produced by Columbia Pictures. The script was written by Ray in 1967, loosely based on Bankubabur Bandhu (Banku Babu's Friend or Mr. Banku's Friend), a Bengali science fiction story he had written in 1962 for Sandesh, the Ray family magazine, which gained popularity among Bengalis in the early 1960s. Bankubabur Bandhu was eventually adapted into a television film by Satyajit Ray's son Sandip Ray, and a play by the theatre group Swapnasandhani Kaushik Sen, in 2006.

The Alien project has been called "the most bizarre episode in Ray's career".

== Plot ==
The plot revolves around a spaceship that lands in a pond in rural Bengal. The villagers begin worshiping it as a temple risen from the depths of the earth. The alien, known as "Mr Ang", establishes contact with a young village boy named Haba (meaning "Dumb" in Bengali) through dreams and also plays a number of pranks on the village community in the course of its short stay on planet Earth. The plot contains the ebullient presence of an Indian businessman, a journalist from Calcutta and an American engineer.

Ray's biographer W. Andrew Robinson describes one particular scene from the screenplay as follows: "In a series of fantastically quick, short steps over the lotus leaves, the Alien reaches the shore of the pond. He looks down at the grass, examines the blade and is off hopping into the bamboo grove. There the Alien sees a small plant. His eyes light up with a yellow light. He passes his hand over the plant, and flowers come out. A thin, soft high-pitched laugh shows the Alien is pleased."

== Production ==
Ray wrote the script in early 1967.

The Alien had Columbia Pictures as producer for this planned US–India co-production, and Peter Sellers and Marlon Brando acting in lead roles. However, Ray was surprised to find that the script he had written had already been copyrighted and the fee appropriated by Michael Wilson, a Colombo-based producer who acted as Ray's representative in Hollywood. Wilson had copyrighted the script as co-writer, despite not being involved in any way in its creation. Marlon Brando later dropped out of the project and though an attempt was made to bring James Coburn in his place, Ray became disillusioned and returned to Calcutta. Columbia expressed interest in reviving the project several times in the 1970s and 1980s but nothing came of it.

"Ray had not completely ruled out The Alien project when, in 1982, Steven Spielberg's E.T: The Extraterrestrial premiered".

== Legacy ==
When the film E.T. the Extra-Terrestrial was produced in 1982, Ray noted similarities in the movie to his own earlier script. Ray discussed the collapse of the project in a 1980 Sight & Sound feature, with further details revealed by his biographer Andrew Robinson (in The Inner Eye, 1989). Ray claimed that Steven Spielberg's film "would not have been possible without my script of The Alien being available throughout America in mimeographed copies." When the issue was raised by the press, Spielberg denied this claim and said "I was a kid in high school when his script was circulating in Hollywood." Star Weekend disputes Spielberg's claim, pointing out that he had graduated from high school in 1965 and began his career as a director in Hollywood in 1969. The Times of India noted that E.T. and Close Encounters of the Third Kind (1977) had "remarkable parallels" with The Alien. These parallels include the physical nature of the alien. In his screenplay, which Ray wrote entirely in English, he described the alien as "a cross between a gnome and a famished refugee child: large head, spindly limbs, a lean torso. Is it male or female or neuter? We don't know. What its form basically conveys is a kind of ethereal innocence, and it is difficult to associate either great evil or great power with it; yet a feeling of eeriness is there because of the resemblance to a sickly human child."

The 2003 Hindi film Koi... Mil Gaya, directed by Rakesh Roshan, appears to be based on Satyajit Ray's The Alien. In particular, the film appears to parallel The Alien more closely than E.T. in that it revolves around an intellectually disabled person coming in contact with a friendly alien.

In 2003, Satyajit Ray's son Sandip Ray began working on adapting Ray's original 1962 story Bankubabur Bandhu into a Bengali television movie of the same name. The adapted film, directed by Kaushik Sen, was eventually shown on television in India in 2006. This version is based on Ray's original story Bankubabur Bandhu where the protagonist was a school teacher named Banku Babu, in contrast to his script for The Alien where the protagonist was a boy named Haba.

== Reception ==
The project was said to "expostulate [Ray] posthumanist vision". "Satyajit Ray's conception of an alien is almost like his idea of a Bengali male–a missing link between the childlike (that is, somewhat unformed) and the ridiculous", wrote Narasingha P. Sil.
