= Charu Chandra Bhattacharya =

Indian science teacher and writer (1883–1961)

- Born: 29 June 1883; South 24 Parganas, Bengal Province, British India
- Died: 26 August 1961 (aged 78)
- Resting place: Calcutta, Shantiniketan
- Other name: চারুচন্দ্র ভট্টাচার্য
- Occupations: Writer, teacher
- Parent(s): Basanta Kumar Bhattacharya (father), Menaka Devi

Charu Chandra Bhattacharya (Bengali: চারুচন্দ্র ভট্টাচার্য; 1883–1961) was a prominent science teacher and writer of various scientific articles mainly for children in Bengali.

== Early life and career ==
Bhattacharya was born to Basanta Kumar Bhattacharya (father) and Menaka Devi on 29 June 1883 (16 Asharh, 1290 in the Bengali calendar). His ancestral house was at Harinavi, South 24 Parganas, West Bengal, India. From childhood, he was an extraordinary student. He passed the "Entrance Examination" with first class from Metropolitan Institution, Calcutta in 1899. In 1901, Bhattacharya stood 12th place in the F. A. examination. He did his graduation (B. A.) with an Honours from Presidency College (affiliated to the University of Calcutta at that time) in 1903 and Masters (M. A.) from the University of Calcutta in 1905 in physics.

His professional career was started through the post of a Demonstrator at Physics department of Presidency College, later he joined the faculty there. Till 1940, he performed this duty for nearly 35 years. He got Jagadish Chandra Bosu as a teacher when he was a student; and Meghnad Saha, Satyendra Nath Bosu, Sisir Kumar Mitra & Prashanta Chandra Mahalnabish as students when he was a teacher of Presidency College. Another student, Pratul Chandra Gupta once told that, "...he could explain complex matters in a very simple way."

== Personal life ==
All of his writings are in a simple dialect. He preferred Chalit Bhasha than Sadhu Bhasha while writing. Bhattacharya died on 26 August 1961.

== Contributions ==
=== As a writer and publisher ===
In 1939, he joined in the publication department of Visva Bharati, Shantiniketan. At that time, the world was terrified by the Second World War & the department had not sufficient money. But, even in this situation, Bhattacharya dared to publish the Rabindra Rochonaboli (Collected works by Rabindranath) and finally did it with Prashanta Chandra Mahalnabish, though these books were not of much demand.

Later, when Rabindranath Tagore planned to publish Bishwa Vidya Songroho and LokShiksha series of books to promote literacy, Bhattacharya performed this task. First book of LokShiksha was BishwaPorichoy by Tagore himself, which the poet dedicated to Satyendra Nath Bosu. In 1943, after two years of death of Tagore, Bhattacharya started writing more books of the Bishwa Vidya Songroho series. His first book was about the great scientist: Jagadish Chandra Bosu and named as Jagadish Chandrer Abishkar (Innovation of Jagadish) (1943). LokShiksha series consisted of 10 books, out of which 5 were of science, and out of nearly 150 books of BishwaVidyaSongroho, around 50 books were of science.

Pulin Bihari Sen, who was among the pioneers of Bengali publication, once told that,

...The main achievement of him is that, he has created a new hope in culture of science in Bengali by motivating a group of authors in this way.

He can be thought of as a successful successor to Jagadananda Roy & Ramendra Sundar Tribedi. His first book on popular science was Nabya Bijnan (Neo Science; 1918). Later, in 1926, his second book Ban(g)alir Khadyo (Food of Bengali) was published.

He had a deep connection with Bangiya Bijnan Parishad, founded by Satyendra Nath Bose. He was an active member of the first executive committee. He was elected the vice-president from 1949 to 1958, president during 1960–61. His article, Acharya Jagadish Chandra Bosu was published in the first issue of the famous magazine, Jnan O Bijnan, published from the organisation. Like Visva Bharati, this organisation also had LokBijnan and Bijnan Probesh series. First book of LokBijnan series was Bhattacharya's Toriter Avyutthan in 1949. The first 4 books of the Bijnan Probesh series were also written by him: Praromvo, PodarthoVidya in 3 volumes; all of these were published in 1949. On 31 December 1956, he was included in the trustee of Bongiya Bijnan Parishad.

After the demise of Rajshekhar Bosu, he delivered the First Rajshekhar Bosu Memorial Lecture, which later is published in a book entitled Poromanur Neucleus in 1962. A few more books in this context are: Acharya Jagadish Chandra Bosu (1938), Boijnanik Abishkarer Kahini (1953), Bishwer Upadan (1943), Byadhir Porajoy (1949), PodartoVidyar NoboJug (1951).

=== As an editor ===
In first life, Bhattacharya edited a magazine, Beporoya. Later he edited Bosudhara for a long time. Bhandar, the journal of Samabay Samiti was edited by him (during the 1926–1932 years). This magazine was also edited by Tagore.

=== As a preceptor ===
Besides writing on popular science, he wrote 2 textbooks of science for classes VI & VIII of West Bengal Board of Secondary Education. Bhattacharya contributed in making Bengali terminology a lot. Calcutta University once established a committee regarding this, where Rajshekhar Bosu was the president and Bhattacharya was the secretary. He also helped the Central Government of India regarding various measurement and terminologies of science. His articles are often found in many school level textbooks of literature in West Bengal.

== List of articles ==
- Acharya Jagadish Chandra Bosu
- Alo Aar Ron(g): Bhanga Gorar Khela: PodarthoVidya (2nd vol.), Bijnan Probesh series.
- Chokh
- Taper NanaKotha
- Tap Cholachol
- Jenar O Basonter Tika: Byadhir Porajoy, LokShiksha series.
- Pasteur O Rogjibanu
- Pasteurer Porobortigon
- Galileo: Boijnanik Abishkarer Kahini.
- Newton
- Thomas Alva Edison
- Marie Curie
- Ronald Ross
- Ex-Roshmi Abishkar: PodarthoVidyar Nobojug, LokShiksha series.
- Atom-Anko
- Radiumer Prokriti
- Atom Bhan(g)a
- Atom Boma O Hydrogen Boma
- Upadaner Prokriti: Bishwer Upadan, Bishwa Vidya Songroha.
- Electron O Proton
- Electroner Prokriti
- Keno Rokomari Khabar: Ban(g)alir Khadyo.
- Khabar Bachhai, Bachhai Khabar
- Amar Pathddoshar Kale:

== See also ==
- Rajshekhar Bosu
