= The Da Vinci Code WebQuests =

Web-based puzzles

The Da Vinci Code WebQuests (also called The Da Vinci Code Challenges) are a series of web-based puzzles related to the bestselling 2003 novel The Da Vinci Code, as well as the 2006 film. There have been several unrelated web quests, including one in 2006 run by Google.

== Original official promotional WebQuests ==
The original Da Vinci Code web quest challenges were first made available via the website of the book's author, Dan Brown, as part of a promotional campaign, and both remain hosted on the publisher's website. In January 2004, it was announced on the live television program Good Morning America that hundreds of thousands of people had participated in the original challenge, and that 40,000 people had successfully completed it. Though the official "prize" was given out at that time, the web versions of the quests were never closed, and have remained active ever since. The original version involved deciphering a series of cryptic clues at the publisher's website. Those wishing to solve the quests were required to examine the U.S. version of the book's dustcover jacket, and to search the web to learn the answers to certain questions or clues. The second Da Vinci Code WebQuest, titled Uncover The Code, followed a similar style.

== The Google WebQuest ==
On April 17, 2006, Google launched its own Da Vinci Code-related quest, based around the release of The Da Vinci Code's film version. It was created in coordination with Sony Pictures, and was called the Da Vinci Code Google Quest, an online series of puzzles with a prize offered to those who answer all 24 puzzles correctly. Participants were required to sign up for a Google Account in order to play.

The first part of the puzzle ended on May 11, 2006, with those who qualified as finalists continuing to play until May 21.

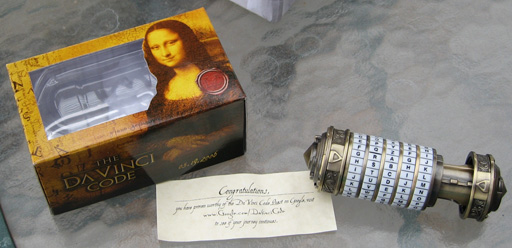
Cryptex replica, scroll which includes the URL to the final puzzle, and the box it came in

In the USA the first 10,000 people who finished all 24 puzzles on May 11, 2006, and successfully registered for the final contest received a Cryptex replica with a scroll inside, containing a URL to the final puzzle (the code to open the cryptex was "GRAIL", and only the last two letters were necessary). The final puzzle was released on May 19, 2006, at approximately 1:00 pm EDT, and was based on a 48-hour time limit from when the individual started the timer (logged into the site to start their puzzles). The finalist with the shortest time to complete all five puzzles was to be declared the winner. Had this phase not produced a definitive winner, the quest would have entered a final phase involving an essay challenge.

Within the USA, the prize was substantial, with an estimated retail value of US$128,170.54 and included:

- First-class round-trip air transportation for four to New York City, Paris, Rome and London courtesy of Orbitz.com. (Approximate Retail Value (ARV): $97,000.00)
- Four nights deluxe hotel accommodations and ground transportation for four at each travel destination courtesy of BooksAMillion and Frommer's. (ARV: $16,600.00)
- Four Leisure Select return tickets from London to Paris and London to Avignon courtesy of Eurostar. (ARV: $5,797.24)
- One Sony 40" BRAVIA S-Series LCD HDTV Television (ARV: $2,999.99)
- One Sony VAIO VGN-TX770P/B Laptop (ARV: $2,599.99)
- One Sony Cyber-shot DSC-N1 Digital Camera (ARV: $499.95)
- One Sony Platinum DVD Dream System (model DAV-X1) (ARV: $799.99)
- One Sony NV-U70 Portable Navigation System (ARV: $599.95)
- One Sony DPP-FP50 Digital Photo Printer (ARV: $149.95)
- Four Sony Walkman Core MP3 Players (ARV $639.80)
- Four copies of the Frommer’s Guide Books and Day by Day Guides to New York, Paris, Rome and London. (ARV: $483.68)

Estimated retail value for grand prize and finalist prizes was $428,170.54.

Outside the US there were various prize packages and rules for different countries. All those who successfully completed all 24 puzzles before the closing date for that country were entered in a prize draw with prizes ranging from a set of Da Vinci Code Top Trumps cards to illustrated copies of The Da Vinci Code.

=== Grand prize winner ===
The Google-sponsored webquest was taken offline once the final phase was completed. According to a written response for the Official Winners List from Hilltop New Media, Inc. on behalf of Google, the winner was Anthony N. (last name withheld) from Collierville, Tennessee. It is unknown what his final puzzle time was.

Perhaps due to complications arising out of the American version of the Quest, it appears that winners have never been announced in any of the other countries in which the Quest was running. These countries (including Australia and the United Kingdom) had a cut-down version of the quest that included neither codexes nor a timed "final challenge".

== The Eurostar Da Vinci Code WebQuest ==
Another webquest launched in mid-May 2006, called the Eurostar Quest. Participants were invited to "board the Eurostar", taking them through various destinations in Paris and London, encountering riddles, puzzles and hidden clues scattered across both cities. It was won by Olivier Klein, a 28-year-old IT technician from Schweighouse-sur-Moder.

== See also ==
- The Da Vinci Code
- The Da Vinci Code (film)
- The Da Vinci Code (video game)
