= Jagadananda Roy =

- জগদানন্দ রায
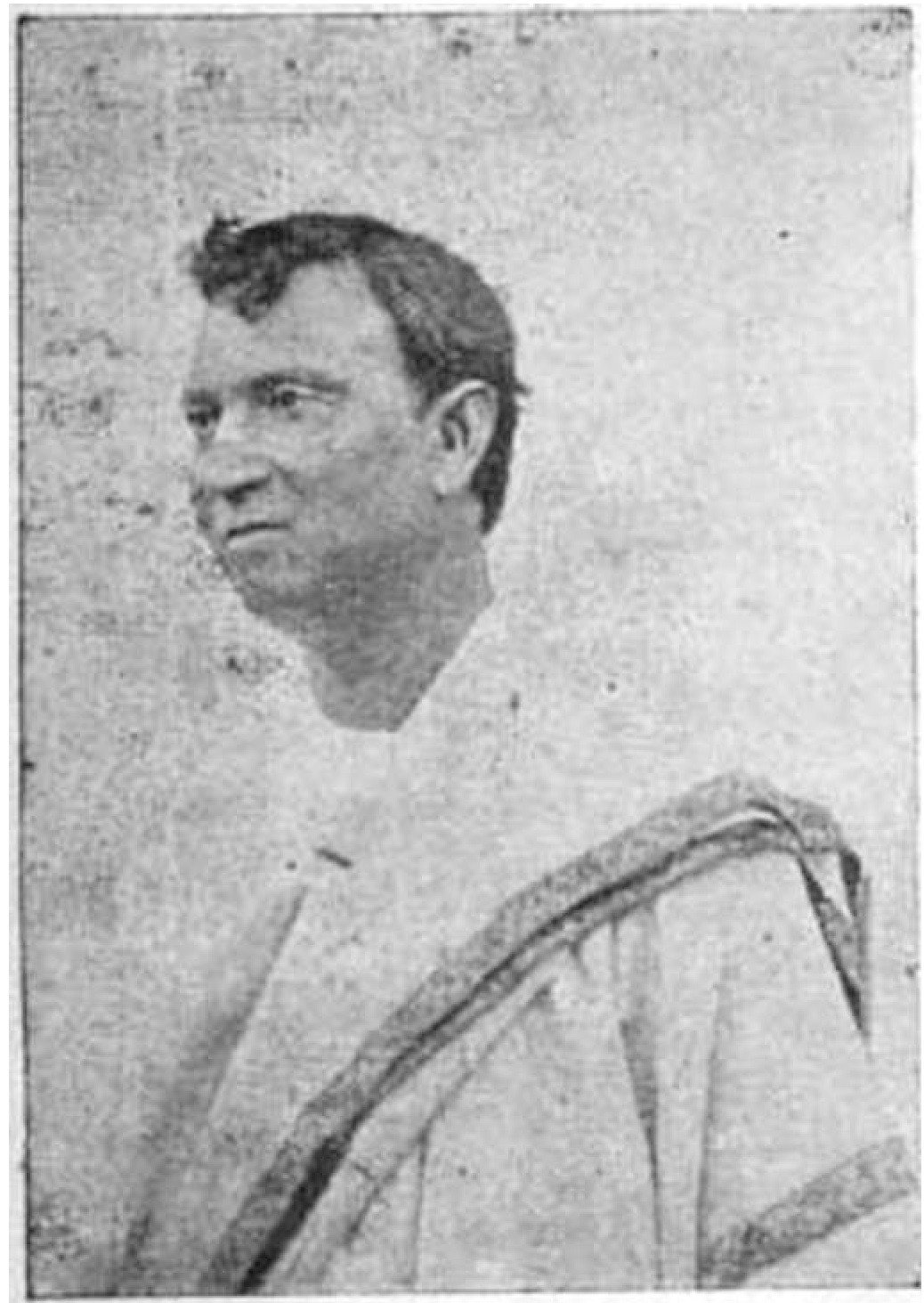
- Jagadananda Roy
- Born: 18 September 1869; Krishnanagar, Bengal Presidency, British India (now in Nadia district, West Bengal)
- Died: 25 June 1933 (aged 63); Shantiniketan, Bengal Presidency, British India (now in West Bengal, India)
- Occupations: professor, Writer
- Writing career
- Language: Bengali
- Subject: Science fiction
- Literary movement: Bengali Renaissance

Jagadananda Roy (Bengali: জগদানন্দ রায; 1869–1933) was a scientific article writer as well as Bengali science fiction writer. His works were primarily written for teens.

Born in an aristocratic family from Krishnanagar, Nadia, he went to teach in a missionary school and wrote popular articles on science. He met Rabindranath Tagore who edited a journal called Sadhana and Roy later joined to become a teacher at Rabindranath Tagore's Visva Bharati.

He also wrote numerous books on science including such as Prakrtiki Paricay, Vijnanacarya Jagadis Basur Abiskar, Vaijnaniki, Prakrtiki, Jnanasopan, Grahanaksatra, Pokamakad (on insects), Vijnaner Galpa, Gachpala, Mach-byang-sap, sabda, Pakhi (on birds), Naksatracena (on stars).

Roy wrote one of the earliest science fiction stories in Bengali, Shukra Bhraman (Travels to Venus) in 1892, later published in his book Prakritiki (1914). This described travel to Venus and conjured up alien creatures on Uranus. His humanoid aliens are described as resembling apes, with dense black fur, large heads and long nails. This imaginative science-fiction preceded that of H. G. Wells' somewhat similar The War of the Worlds (1898) by about a decade.

== See also ==
- Bengali science fiction
- Charu Chandra Bhattacharya
