= Yashodhara Ray Chaudhuri =

Indian poet

- Born: 1965 (age 60–61)
- Occupation: Poet

Yashodhara Ray Chaudhuri (born 1965) is an Indian poet. She produced collections of Bengali poetry. She was awarded the Krittibas Puraskar prize in 1998 by the Krittibas Patrika.

Yashodhara is a translator from the original French language into Bengali. She was awarded the Diplome de langue from Alliance Francaise du Calcutta in 1998 and has translated Leonardo da Vinci by Serge Bremley in 2008 and Combat de la Vie by Dr. Luc Montaignier in 2012. She has also translated the Martian Chronicles by Ray Bradbury from English. Science Fiction is one of her passions. She is married to Trinanjan Chakrabarty, a scholar and teacher of the French language.

== Early life ==
Chaudhuri studied philosophy at Presidency College, Kolkata, then affiliated with the University of Calcutta, from 1984 to 1989.

== Career ==
Her first published work was Panyasamhita (Psalms on Commodities) (1996, Kabita Pakshik). This was followed by Pisachinikabya (The She–Demonic Verses) (1998, Kabita Pakshik). It is a book of love poems centering on alienation, distorted relationships, and loneliness.

Chaudhuri authored two works in 1999, Chirantan Galpomala (Timeless Tales) and Radio-Bitan (The Radio Garden).

Abar Prothom theke Poro (Read Anew from A) (2001 Ananda Publishers) featured themes of the creation of life—especially childbirth—as well as childhood and society. Meyeder Projatantra (The Republic of Women) (2005, Saptarshi Prakashan) was another. Themes include relationships between women. She wrote in the voice of the womb, which compares itself to the womb of the grandmother and the mother. Another section, "Dharabahik Uponyas" (Serialized Novelette), tells about the ongoing journey of communication between women across time, space, and generations.

She published one collection of stories, "Meyeder Kichhu Ekta Hoyechhe" (2007, Deep Prokashan), including ten stories written between 1989 and 2006.

A collection of poetry, Kurukshetra, On-Line (2008, Saptarshi Prakashan), as the book related to the recent killings and political unrest in Bengal, especially the Nandigram carnage. Recent publications include Chhaya-Shoririni (2009, Pratibhas), a collection of three novellas. It deals with characters bordering on virtual reality, whose professional and personal life is submerged in a plethora of complex identities created by social networking sites, reality TV, and news shows.

In 2008, she translated a French book, Leonardo da Vinci by Serge Bremley.

Godyabodhi, a collection of Bengali prose, was published in January 2020, containing nine essays on poetry.

Chaudhuri was a 1991 batch member of the Indian Audit and Accounts Service and works for the Comptroller and Auditor General of India. As of 2019, she had served in Jharkhand, West Bengal, Assam, and Odisha.

== Publications ==
Poetry

- 1996 Panya Samhita
- 1998 Pisachini Kabya
- 1999 Chirantan Galpo mala
- 1999 Radio Bitan
- 2001 Abar Prothom Theke Poro
- 2005 Meyeder Projatantro
- 2007 Kurukkhetro Online
- 2010 Virtualer Nabin Kishor
- 2012 Kabita Sangraha (anthology)
- 2015 Matribhumi Bumper
- 2016 Nijhum Grontho
- 2017 Bhabadehe Swargiya Sangit
- 2017 Shreshtho Kobita (anthology of selected poetry)
- 2020 Jwar parabarty, Signet
- 2022 Peerasamuha, Barnik
- 2023 Anabadamaner Kobita, Dhansere (edited work)

Prose

- 2007 BunchiLand (children's book)
- 2007 Meyeder kichu ekta hoyeche (short stories)
- 2008 Chhaya sharirini (3 novellas)
- 2013 Solitaire (short stories)
- 2014 Bishal Bharatiya Laghu Galpo (short stories)
- 2017 Electra (short stories)
- 2018 Bhalobasar Golpo (short stories. Sopan Publishers Kolkata)
- 2019 Ladies Compartment (short stories. Deys Publishers Kolkata)
- 2020 Godyabodhi (collection of Bengali Proses. Tobuo Proyas Prokashoni)
- 2021 Onkiter budbud, Kalpobiswa
- 2021 Kankabati Kalpobiggan lekheni, Kalpabiswa (Co-edited collection of sci-fi by women)
- 2022 Urnanabho, Barnik
- 2022 Khanditar Biswadarshan, Sristisukh
- 2023 Hariye Jawa Gaaner khata, lyrical books
- 2023 Uran Ofuran, Sristisukh
- 2023 Asahobas theke Anabodaman, Karigar

Translation work

- 2008 Leonardo da Vinci (translation from original French)
- 2011 Bosquet Bobin Burine er kobita (translation from French poetry)
- 2012 Rog O tar Pratikar (translation from original French)
- 2022 Mongol Groher Diary, Ray Bradbury (from English The Martian Chronicles)
