= The Templar Revelation =

1997 book by Lynn Picknett and Clive Prince

- First U.S. edition cover
- Author: Lynn Picknett and Clive Prince
- Publisher: Transworld Publishers Ltd (United Kingdom); Touchstone Books (United States)
- Pages: 432 (U.S. paperback)
- ISBN: 0-684-84891-0
- OCLC: 40159168
- Followed by: The Sion Revelation

The Templar Revelation: Secret Guardians of the True Identity of Christ is a book written by Lynn Picknett and Clive Prince and published in 1997 by Transworld Publishers Ltd in Great Britain, Australia and New Zealand. It proposes a fringe hypothesis regarding the relationship between Jesus, John the Baptist and Mary Magdalene, and states that their true story has been suppressed by the Roman Catholic Church through, among other tactics, the conscious selection of the texts that make up the canonical New Testament, their campaigns against heresy, and their propaganda against non-Christians.

== Summary ==
While researching the life and works of Leonardo da Vinci, including "his part in faking the Turin Shroud" which the authors wrote about in their book Turin Shroud— In Whose Image?, they discovered a number of signs of unorthodox Christian thinking in the imagery used to portray some of the central characters in the New Testament, especially John the Baptist. Some paintings examined for their unusual choice of imagery include the two versions of Madonna of the Rocks and The Last Supper.

In the latter painting, they propose that the person in the painting seated, from a viewer's point of view, to the left of Jesus is Mary Magdalene rather than John the Apostle, as most art historians identify that person. Furthermore, they point out that their body angles form the letter M, a reference to the Magdalene, and that she and Jesus are dressed in similar but oppositely colored clothes, a negative image of each other. They also mention a number of other signs: a mystery knife pointed at one of the characters, that Leonardo da Vinci himself is in the painting with his face pointing away from Jesus, and that Jesus is confronted by an admonishing hand to his right making "the John gesture," an index finger pointing up.

In trying to understand the significance of these unusual images they conducted research into what they term a "thread of heresy" that reaches back over 2000 years. They claim to find evidence for this occult tradition in such assorted subjects as The Knights Templar, the Cathars, Gnosticism, the Holy Grail, and the legends connected with southern France, and in particular the town of Rennes-le-Château. They utilise the historical and biblical scholarship of such people as Morton Smith, Hugh J. Schonfield, G.R.S. Mead, Frances A. Yates, and Geza Vermes on which to build their claims.

Among their conclusions are the following:

- Jesus was a disciple of John the Baptist, and that John's religious teachings were essentially that of the Egyptian mystery religion of Isis-Osiris-Horus.
- Jesus was initiated into the inner circle of John the Baptist, but was not selected to succeed him. Rather it was Simon Magus who was selected as John the Baptist's successor.
- Mary Magdalene had a ritualized, "sacred" sexual relationship with Jesus, in keeping with their religious beliefs, and as his initiator into the sacred mysteries had an equal relationship to Jesus.
- Politics and religion were synonymous in ancient Israel, and Jesus was an astute and aggressive political competitor against John.
- The Jesus group (but not Jesus) may have been responsible for the death of John the Baptist.
- Jesus’ disciples were not initiated into the inner mysteries of his teachings.
- The term Christ had a different significance to the participants in the biblical drama than they do nowadays. To those in John the Baptist's circle it would have referred to all who were baptized and initiated into the arcana of their belief system.
- Numerous images and stories in the canonical New Testament are in actuality adaptations of those found in other religious traditions, and are not unique.
- Jesus is one in a line of many dying-and-rising gods, who share many similar traits.

The authors offer, but not claim, that perhaps Leonardo da Vinci was sending veiled messages through his art, which could be understood only by others who were open to their meaning. And while on the surface these paintings seem to be simple biblical depictions, they represent in fact his belief in the superiority of John the Baptist over Jesus.

== Reception ==
CNN dismissed the authors' findings in their review, calling their viewpoints "upside-down" and criticizing their reliance on non-canonical sources. They concluded that the book's ideas "are based on the flimsiest of premises which are supported by the slimmest of indirect and circumstantial evidence".

In a review for The Newcastle Herald, Alfred Holland derided the book's findings, but praised its entertainment value, stating "for this reviewer it's all a load of manure, but if your scene is a tight, well-written romp pursuing bewitching and imaginative speculation through the byzantine corridors of history, and you want an escape from our present-day, equally byzantine, political magicians, then it's a thoroughly enjoyable read."

Writing for The Courier-Mail, Alison Coates similarly noted that "this is not a book for which serious academic claims can be made but it is not entirely without value, because it attempts (sometimes successfully) to put puzzling historical events into an understandable context and to raise important questions about the beginnings of the Christian church."
