= Oxford Bookstore =

Indian bookstore chain

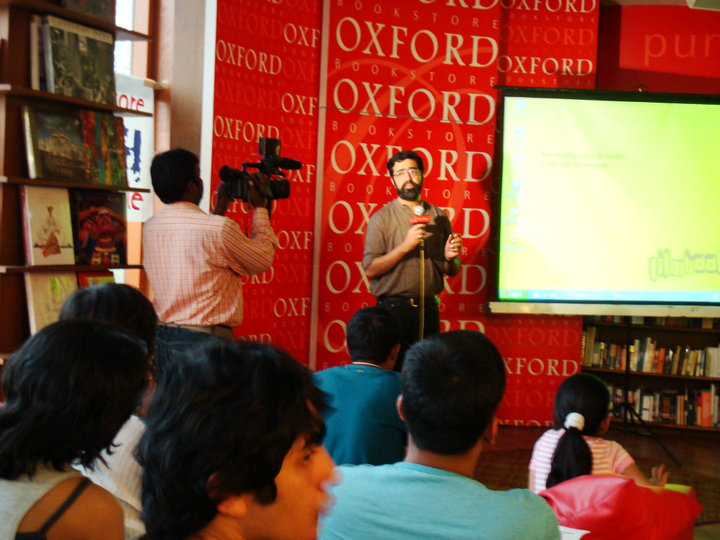
A book event at Oxford bookstore

The Oxford Bookstore, formerly known as Oxford Bookstore and Stationery Company, is an Indian book store chain established in 1919. It has no connection with Oxford University Press. Its outlets, on prime locations in the high streets of most of the major cities of the Raj such as Delhi, Mumbai, Meerut, Chennai (2006) and Calcutta, are well known even today. Still known as the Oxford Bookstores, the outlets are now managed by the Apeejay Surrendra Group, a Calcutta-based conglomerate, while the book wholesaling business has been merged with India Book House to become Oxford and IBH.

== Name ==
Oxford University Press came to India in 1912, and learned of the existence of the Oxford Bookstores shortly after they were set up in 1919. They had a brief legal tussle over the use of the telegraphic address 'Oxonian', but in general tolerated and even encouraged the firm, giving them special terms for OUP and Clarendon Press titles. ‘An enterprising firm, certainly good at display,’ Humphrey Sumner Milford, Publisher to the University, commented to Sir Maurice Gwyer.

OUP had taken legal advice and been told that the geographical identifier ‘Oxford’ carried no protection unless teamed with ‘University’ or ‘Press’; and if any two words of the name were used they could ‘jump in with both feet’, as Milford said, and prosecute for trademark violation. The Press had been able to stifle the activities of the University of Oxford, Tennessee, without too much trouble, but marmalade, sausages and shoes could all call themselves ‘Oxford’ with impunity. Milford encouraged Oxford Bookstores because he felt their ‘enterprise’ deserved it, and since they were not publishers their operations actually helped OUP, and the confusion over who owned the Oxford Bookstores may have acted in OUP's advantage.

== History ==
The Oxford Bookstore was a landmark in Calcutta during the days of the Raj, along with Whiteaway Laidlaw's famous departmental store. Like most bookshops of the time, the store also stocked fancy leather goods, toys, perfume, albums, photo frames, indoor games, playing cards and silver and electroplated goods. It features in the memoirs of many eminent British and Indian figures of the twentieth century, and has always played a part in the city's life. In the 1970s, during the Naxalite rising, it was used as a message drop-off point by activists, who would slip notes into particular books for other members of their group to find.

=== India Book House ===
The Cover of a Laurel and Hardy Comic Book produced in India by Kiran Publications for India Book House under licence from Larry Harmon Pictures

India Book House Pvt. Limited (IBH), formed in 1952, was an importer, distributor and publisher of books and magazines in India. It was headquartered in Mumbai, and later merged with the 'Oxford Bookstore and Stationery Company'. It published paperback editions of children's authors such as Enid Blyton and Frederick Forsyth, as well as comics such as The Adventures of Tintin and Asterix, often in Indian languages as well. Their most famous series is the Amar Chitra Katha comics line that retells stories from the great Indian epics, mythology, history, folklore, and fables. In 2007, the imprint and all its titles were acquired by ACK Media Pvt. Limited which owns brands such as Amar Chitra Katha and Tinkle. The new entity IBH Books and Magazines Distributors Pvt. Ltd, is one of the leading publishers of illustrated volumes on Indian history and heritage, specializing in architecture, fine art, decorative art, film, environment, and lifestyle
