= List of books about Jesus =

This is a bibliography of works with information or interpretations of the life and teachings of Jesus. The list is grouped by date, and sorted within each group (except for the very earliest works) alphabetically by name of author.

Jesus of Nazareth (/ˈdʒiːzəs/; 7–2 BC/BCE to 30–36 AD/CE), commonly referred to as Jesus Christ or simply as Jesus or Christ, is the central figure of Christianity. Most Christian denominations venerate him as God the Son incarnated and believe that he rose from the dead after being crucified. The principal sources of information regarding Jesus are the four canonical gospels. Note that this list does not contain important books about Jesus pertaining to Islam, the Church of Jesus Christ of Latter-day Saints, Bahá'í, or several other significant faiths.

== 1st and 2nd centuries ==
- The New Testament of the Bible, especially the Gospels (see List of Gospels). Editions include The Greek New Testament, Aland, United Bible Societies.
- The Nag Hammadi Library
- The Diatessaron by Tatian, a harmonisation of the four canonical Gospels.
- Miller, Robert J., ed. (1 September 2010). The Complete Gospels (4th ed.). Salem, OR: Polebridge Press. ISBN 978-1598150186.
- Holmes, Michael W., ed. (1999). The Apostolic Fathers: Greek texts and English Translations (3rd ed.). Grand Rapids, MI: Baker Books. 1st edition 1890, translated and edited by Lightfoot, J. B.; 1891, revised by Harmer, J. R.
- Josephus, Antiquities of the Jews 18.63-64 (18.3.3 in the numbering system of older editions). The authenticity of this passage is disputed.

== 7th century ==
- The Quran, especially chapters 3 through 5 and 19.

== 17th century ==
- Browne, Sir Thomas (1672). Pseudodoxia Epidemica ("Vulgar Errors") (6th ed.). Link to online text in Wikipedia article.

== 18th century ==
- Dupuis, Charles François (1872). The Origin of All Religious Worship. Translated from the French. New Orleans – via archive.org. First French edition 1798, abridged from a 12-volume work of 1795.
- Reimarus, Hermann Samuel (1970) [c.1750–1760]. Buchanan, George Wesley (ed.). The Goal of Jesus and His Disciples. Translated from the German by Buchanan, George Wesley. Leiden: E. J. Brill. The English title does not correspond to that of any work by Reimarius in either German or English Wikipedia.
- Volney, C. F. (1890) [1802]. The Ruins, or Meditations on the Revolutions of Empires: and the Law of Nature. Translated from the French by Thomas Jefferson and Joel Barlow. New York, NY: Twentieth Century Publishing Co – via gutenberg.org. Original French publication 1791.

== 19th century ==
- The Book of Mormon, especially Third Nephi.
- Doctrine and Covenants
- Bauer, Bruno (May 2002) [1843]. Trejo, Paul (ed.). An English Edition of Bruno Bauer's 1843 Christianity Exposed: A Recollection of the Eighteenth Century and a Contribution to the Crisis of the Nineteenth Century. Translated from the German by Ziegler, Esther. Lewiston, NY: Edwin Mellen Press. ISBN 978-0773471832.
- Carlyle, Thomas (1896). On Heroes and Hero-Worship: and the Heroic in History. London: Ward, Lock & Bowden Ltd.
- Edersheim, Alfred (1883). The Life and Times of Jesus the Messiah.
- Kierkegaard, Søren (1941) [1850]. Training in Christianity, and the Edifying Discourse Which 'Accompanied' It. Translated from the Danish. Oxford: Oxford University Press.
- Notovitch, Nicolas (1890). The Unknown Life of Jesus Christ. Translated from the Russian by J. H. Connelly and L. Landsberg. New York, NY: R. F. Fenno – via gutenberg.org. Original Russian publication 1887.
- Renan, Joseph Ernest (1863). The Life of Jesus. London: Trübner & Co.
- Strauss, David Friedrich (June 1, 2010) [1846]. The Life of Jesus, Critically Examined. Translated from the 4th German edition by George Eliot. Cosimo Classics. ISBN 978-1616403096. Original German publication 1835–36.
- Strauss, David Friedrich (1879). The Life of Jesus for the People. Authorised translation (2nd ed.). London and Edinburgh: Williams and Norgate – via archive.org. Original German publication 1864.
- Strauss, David Friedrich (1977). The Christ of Faith and the Jesus of History: A Critique of Schleiermacher's The Life of Jesus. Translated from the German by Keck, Leander E. Minneapolis, MN: Fortress Press. ISBN 978-0800612733. Original German publication 1865.
- Tolstoy, Leo (1894). The Kingdom of God is Within You. Translated from the Russian by Garnett, Constance. New York, NY: Cassell Publishing Co – via gutenberg.org., Wikipedia article The Kingdom of God is Within You. Original Russian publication 1894.
- White, Ellen G. (1898). The Desire of Ages. Written by a founder of the Seventh-day Adventist Church. Link to online text in main Wikipedia article.

== 20th century ==
=== 1901–1950 ===
- Bundy, Walter E. (1922). The Psychic Health of Jesus. New York: The Macmillan Company – via archive.org.
- Brandes, Georg (1926). Jesus: A Myth. Translated from the Danish by Björkman, Edwin. New York: Albert & Charles Boni.
- Dobson, Rev. C. C. (May 29, 2008) [1936]. Did Our Lord Visit Britain: As They Say in Cornwall and Somerset? (9th ed.). London: Covenant Publishing. ISBN 978-0852050514.
- Dowling, Levi H. (1911) [1908]. The Aquarian Gospel of Jesus the Christ. The Philosophic and Practical Basis of the Religion of the Aquarian Age of the World and of the Church Universal. London: L. N. Fowler & Co. The main Wikipedia article contains links to the online text.
- Drews, Arthur (1909). The Christ Myth. Translated from the German by Burns, C. Delisle. London and Leipsic: T. Fisher Unwin. Link to online text in Wikipedia article.
- Eisler, Robert (1931). The Messiah Jesus and John the Baptist, According to Flavius Josephus' 'Capture of Jerusalem'. London: Methuen.
- Gibran, Kahlil (March 1995) [1928]. Jesus, the Son of Man. New York, NY: Alfred A. Knopf. ISBN 978-0679439226.
- Graves, Robert (October 1981) [1946]. King Jesus: A Novel. New York, NY: Farrar Straus and Giroux. ISBN 978-0374181147.
- Hoskyns, Sir Edwyn; Davey, Noel (1931). The Riddle of the New Testament. London: Faber and Faber.
- Jack, James William (1933). The Historic Christ. An Examination of Dr. Robert Eisler's Theory According to the Slavonic version of Josephus and the Other Sources. London: J. Clarke & Co.
- Kalthoff, Albert (1907) [1904]. The Rise of Christianity. Translated from the German by McCabe, Joseph. London: Watts & Co – via archive.org.
- Lewis, C. S. (March 3, 2009) [1942–1944]. Mere Christianity (Revised and enlarged ed.). San Francisco: Harper. ISBN 978-0060652920. A book on Christianity and logical support for Jesus as God, from an Anglo-Catholic perspective.
- Morison, Frank (1930). Who Moved the Stone? A Discussion of the Trial, Death and Resurrection of Jesus Christ. London: Faber & Faber.
- Oursler, Fulton (1949), The Greatest Story Ever Told: A Tale Of The Greatest Life Ever Lived, New York: Doubleday.
- Pyle, Howard (1903), Rejected of Men: A Story of To-day, New York: Harper. A novel about Jesus' coming to early twentieth century America.
- Remsburg, John E. (1909). The Christ: A Critical Review and Analysis of the Evidences of His Existence. New York: The Truth Seeker Company – via archive.org.
- Robertson, J. M., M.P. (1917). The Jesus Problem: A Restatement of the Myth Theory. London: Watts & Co – via archive.org.
- Schweitzer, Albert (1910). The Quest of the Historical Jesus: A Critical Study of Its Progress from Reimarus to Wrede. Translated from the German by Montgomery, W. London: Adam and Charles Black – via archive.org.
- Talmage, James E. (1922) [1915]. Jesus the Christ (6th ed.). Salt Lake City, UT: The Church of Jesus Christ of Latter-day Saints – via gutenberg.org. Main Wikipedia article Jesus the Christ (book).
- Urantia Foundation (1924–1955). The Urantia Book. Link to online text in the main Wikipedia article.

=== 1951–2000 ===
- Albright, William F. (1968). Yahweh and the Gods of Canaan: An Historical Analysis of Two Contrasting Faiths. Garden City, New York: Doubleday & Co. ISBN 0-931464-01-3.
- Allegro, John M. (May 18, 1970). The Sacred Mushroom and the Cross: A Study of the Nature and Origins of Christianity Within the Fertility Cults of the Ancient Near East. London: Hodder & Stoughton. ISBN 978-0340128756.
- Andrews, Richard; Schellenberger, Paul (November 1996). The Tomb of God: The Body of Jesus and the Solution to a 2,000-Year-Old Mystery. New York, NY: Little, Brown and Company. ISBN 978-0316042758.
- Badenas, Robert (1985). Christ the End of the Law, Romans 10.4 in Pauline Perspective. Sheffield: JSOT Publishers. ISBN 0-905774-93-0.
- Baigent, Michael; Leigh, Richard; Lincoln, Henry (September 7, 2006) [1982]. The Holy Blood and the Holy Grail (New ed.). New York, NY: Arrow Books. ISBN 978-0099503095.
- Baigent, Michael; Leigh, Richard; Lincoln, Henry (October 1987). The Messianic Legacy. New York, NY: Henry Holt & Company. ISBN 978-0805005684.
- Blomberg, Craig L. (November 10, 2007) [1987]. The Historical Reliability of the Gospels (2nd ed.). Downer's Grove, Illinois: InterVarsity Press. ISBN 978-0830828074.
- Bornkamm, Gunther (1960). Jesus of Nazareth. London: Hodder & Stoughton. ISBN 978-0340011256.
- Brandon, S. G. F. (1967). Jesus and the Zealots: a Study of the Political Factor in Primitive Christianity. Manchester: Manchester University Press. ISBN 978-0684310107.
- Brandon, S. G. F. (1968). The Trial of Jesus of Nazareth. London: Batsford. ISBN 978-0713412505.
- Brown, Raymond E. (October 13, 1997). An Introduction to the New Testament. New Haven: Yale University Press. ISBN 978-0300140163.
- Bultmann, Rudolf (1958). Jesus Christ and Mythology. New York: Charles Scribner's Sons. Bultmann was a prominent figure in early 20th century historical Jesus research.
- Capps, Donald (2000). Jesus: A Psychological Biography. St. Louis, Mo.: Chalice Press. ISBN 978-0-8272-1713-3.
- Carmichael, Joel (1963). The Death of Jesus. London: Victor Gollancz Ltd.
- Cohen, Shaye J. D. (1987). From the Maccabees to the Mishnah. Louisville, KY: Westminster John Knox Press. ISBN 978-0664250171.
- Craig, William Lane (2000). The Son Rises: The Historical Evidence for the Resurrection of Jesus. Eugene, OR: Wipf and Stock. ISBN 978-1579104641.
- Craig, William Lane (1998). Will the Real Jesus Please Stand Up? A Debate Between William Lane Craig and John Dominic Crossan. Grand Rapids, MI: Baker Publishing Group. ISBN 978-0801021756.
- Crossan, John Dominic (August 3, 1996). Who Killed Jesus? Exposing the Roots of Anti-Semitism in the Gospel Story of the Death of Jesus. New York City: HarperCollins. ISBN 978-0060614805. Crossan is a prominent figure in contemporary historical Jesus research.
- Cupitt, Don; Armstrong, Peter (December 1977). Who Was Jesus?. London: BBC Books. ISBN 978-0563174134.
- Davenport, Guy; Urrutia, Benjamin (June 1, 1998). The Logia of Yeshua: The Sayings of Jesus. Berkeley, CA: Counterpoint. ISBN 978-1887178709.
- Dibelius, Martin (1963). Jesus: A Study of the Gospels. UK: SCM Press. Dibelius a prominent figure in 20th century historical Jesus research.
- Doherty, Earl (2005) [1999]. The Jesus Puzzle: Did Christianity Begin with a Mythical Christ? Challenging the Existence of an Historical Jesus. Ottawa: Age of Reason Publications. ISBN 978-0968925911.
- Dundes, Alan (November 1, 1990) [1976]. The Hero Pattern and the Life of Jesus. Princeton, NJ: Princeton University Press. In In Quest of the Hero. ISBN 978-0691020624.
- Dunn, James D. G. (April 1, 1990). Jesus, Paul and the Law. Louisville, KY: Westminster John Knox Press. ISBN 978-0664250959.
- Ehrman, Bart D. (1997). The New Testament: A Historical Introduction to the Early Christian Writings. New York and Oxford: Oxford University Press. ISBN 0-19-508481-0 – via archive.org.
- Ehrman, Bart D. (1999). Jesus: Apocalyptic Prophet of the New Millennium. New York and Oxford: Oxford University Press. ISBN 978-0195124743.
- Faber-Kaiser, A. (April 1977). Jesus died in Kashmir: Jesus, Moses and the Ten Lost Tribes of Israel. Translated from the Spanish by M. G. Horwood. London: Gordon and Cremonesi. ISBN 978-0860330417. Original Spanish publication 1976.
- Fredriksen, Paula (July 1, 1988). From Jesus to Christ: The Origins of the New Testament Images of Christ. New Haven, CT: Yale University Press. ISBN 978-0300040180.
- Fredriksen, Paula (November 1999). Jesus of Nazareth, King of the Jews: A Jewish Life and the Emergence of Christianity. New York, NY: Alfred A. Knopf. ISBN 978-0679446750.
- Freke, Timothy; Gandy, Peter (1999). The Jesus Mysteries: Was the "Original Jesus" a Pagan God?. London: Thorsons. ISBN 978-0722536766.
- Funk, Robert W.; Hoover, Roy W.; Jesus Seminar (January 17, 1994). The Five Gospels: What Did Jesus Really Say? The Search for the Authentic Words of Jesus. New York, NY: Macmillan USA. ISBN 978-0025419490. Funk was an expert on parables, and Crossan (a founding member of the Jesus Seminar) is a major figure in contemporary historical Jesus research. Crossan promotes the view that Jesus was more of a Cynic sage, an important current viewpoint but secondary to the view that he was an apocalyptic prophet.
- Graves, Robert; Podro, Joshua (1953). The Nazarene Gospel Restored. London: Cassell & Co. ASIN B005VN4RCS.
- Graves, Robert (1957). Jesus in Rome: A Historical Conjecture. London: Cassell & Co. ASIN B000J2KBMG.
- Hinnels, John R., ed. (1975). Mithraic Studies: Proceedings of the First International Congress of Mithraic Studies. Manchester: Manchester University Press. ISBN 978-0719005367.
- Johnson, Luke Timothy (1996). The Real Jesus: The Misguided Quest for the Historical Jesus and the Truth of the Traditional Gospels. San Francisco: Harper. ISBN 978-0060641771.
- Joyce, Donovan (January 1973) [1972]. The Jesus Scroll: A Time Bomb for Christianity?. New York, NY: Doubleday. ISBN 978-0803743007.
- Käsemann, Ernst (2013) [1969]. Jesus Means Freedom: A Polemical Survey of the New Testament. London: SCM Press. ISBN 9780334007753. Käsemann is a prominent figure in historical Jesus research.
- Kazantzakis, Nikos (1960) [1955]. The Last Temptation of Christ. Translated from the Greek. Simon & Schuster. ASIN B00M53Z3A2.
- Laidler, Keith (August 31, 1998). The Head of God – The Lost Treasure of the Templars. London: Weidenfeld & Nicolson. ISBN 978-0297841296.
- Leidner, Harold (April 2, 2000). The Fabrication of the Christ Myth. Survey Press. ISBN 978-0967790107.
- Maccoby, Hyam Zoundell (1973). Revolution in Judea. Jesus and the Jewish Resistance. London: Ocean Books.
- Maccoby, Hyam Zoundell (September 5, 2000). Jesus the Pharisee. London: SCM Press. ISBN 978-0334029144.
- McDowell, Josh (October 22, 1999) [1972]. The New Evidence that Demands a Verdict: Fully Updated to Answer the Questions Challenging Christians Today. Nashville, TN: Thomas Nelson. ISBN 978-0785243632.
- Meier, John P. (December 31, 1996) [1991]. A Marginal Jew: Rethinking the Historical Jesus. Volume 1. New York, NY: Bantam Doubleday Dell. ISBN 978-0385264259.
- Meier, John P. (December 31, 1996) [1994]. A Marginal Jew: Rethinking the Historical Jesus. Volume 2. New York, NY: Bantam Doubleday Dell. ISBN 978-0385469920. Volumes 3 and 4: 21st century.
- Mendenhall, George E. (1973). The Tenth Generation: The Origins of the Biblical Tradition. Baltimore, MD: Johns Hopkins University Press. ISBN 9780801812675. A study of the earliest traditions of Israel from linguistic and archaeological evidence which treats the teachings and followers of Jesus in that context.
- Messori, Vittorio (November 1978). Jesus Hypotheses. Translated from the Italian by Smith, M. St Paul Publications. ISBN 978-0854391554. Italian title, Ipotesi su Gesù (1976). A book which initially explores the question of Jesus from two secular points of view, mythical (Jesus never lived) and critical (Jesus was not God), and finally considers a third hypothesis - faith.
- Mitchell, Stephen (October 1991). The Gospel According to Jesus: A New Translation and Guide to His Essential Teaching for Believers and Unbelievers. HarperCollins. ISBN 978-0060166410.
- Pelikan, Jaroslav (July 1, 1985). Jesus Through the Centuries: His Place in the History of Culture. New Haven, CT: Yale University Press. ISBN 978-0300034967.
- Phipps, William E. (February 28, 1986) [1970]. Was Jesus Married? The Distortion of Sexuality in the Christian Tradition (New ed.). Lanham, MD: Rowman & Littlefield. ISBN 978-0819151919.
- Picknett, Lynn; Prince, Clive (August 1, 1997). The Templar Revelation: Secret Guardians of the True Identity of Christ. London: Bantam Press. ISBN 978-0593038703.
- Prophet, Elizabeth Clare (1986). The Lost Years of Jesus: On the Discoveries of Notovich, Abhedananda, Roerich and Caspari. Washington, DC: Summit University Press. ISBN 978-0916766795.
- Rieser, Max (June 1979). The True Founder of Christianity and the Hellenistic Philosophy. Amsterdam: Graduate Press. ISBN 978-9062960811.
- Roberts, Michèle (June 1984). The Wild Girl. London: Routledge. ISBN 978-0413529206. A novel.
- Robinson, John (September 4, 2013) [1963]. Honest to God. London: SCM Press. ISBN 978-0334047339.
- Runeberg, Arne (1952). Jesu korsfästelse i religionshistorisk belysning (in Swedish). Helsingfors: Söderström. Employs evolutionary anthropology.
- Sanders, E. P. (1985). Jesus and Judaism. Minneapolis, MN: Fortress Press. ISBN 978-0800607432. A specialist book, but not inaccessible.
- Sanders, E. P. (November 30, 1995) [1993]. The Historical Figure of Jesus (New ed.). London: Penguin Books. ISBN 978-0140144994. An up-to-date, popular, but thoroughly scholarly book. Sanders is a prominent figure in contemporary historical Jesus research.
- Schaberg, Jane (October 17, 2006) [1987]. Illegitimacy of Jesus: A Feminist Theological Interpretation of the Infancy Narratives (20th anniversary ed.). Sheffield: Sheffield Phoenix Press. ISBN 978-1905048847.
- Schillebeeckx, Edward (June 1, 1987) [1963]. Christ, the Sacrament of the Encounter with God. New York, NY: Sheed and Ward. ISBN 978-0934134729.
- Schweitzer, Albert (1958). The Psychiatric Study of Jesus: Exposition and Criticism. Translated from the German by Joy, Charles R. Boston: Beacon Press – via archive.org.
- Sheen, Fulton J. (December 31, 1977) [1958]. Life of Christ (New ed.). Bantam Doubleday Dell. ISBN 978-0385132206.
- Shorto, Russell (March 17, 1997). Gospel Truth, The New Image of Jesus Emerging from Science and History and Why It Matters. New York: Riverhead Books. ISBN 1-57322-056-6.
- Smith, Morton (1978). Jesus the Magician: Charlatan or Son of God?. Harper & Row.
- Spong, John Shelby (May 11, 1994). Resurrection: Myth or Reality? A Bishop's Search for the Origins of Christianity. Australia: HarperCollins. ISBN 978-0060675462.
- Theissen, Gerd (May 1, 2007) [1987]. The Shadow of the Galilean: The Quest of the Historical Jesus in Narrative Form (20th anniversary ed.). Minneapolis, MN: Fortress Press. ISBN 978-0800639006.
- Theissen, Gerd; Merz, Annette (May 1, 1998) [1996]. The Historical Jesus: A Comprehensive Guide. Minneapolis, MN: Fortress Press. ISBN 978-0800631222. An amazing book, tough but rewarding, exceptionally detailed.
- Thiering, Barbara (May 1992). Jesus & the Riddle of the Dead Sea Scrolls: Unlocking the Secrets of His Life Story. Toronto: HarperCollins. ISBN 978-0060677824.
- Thiering, Barbara (September 17, 1992). Jesus The Man: A New Interpretation from the Dead Sea Scrolls, Decoding the Real Story of Jesus and Mary Magdalene. London: Doubleday. ISBN 978-0385403344.
- Thiering, Barbara (1996). Jesus of the Apocalypse: The Life of Jesus After the Crucifixion. Doubleday. ISBN 978-0385405591.
- Thiering, Barbara (1998). The Book That Jesus Wrote: John's Gospel. Doubleday. ISBN 978-0868247120.
- Vermes, Géza (1973). Jesus the Jew: A Historian's Reading of the Gospels. Minneapolis, MN: Fortress Press. ISBN 978-0800614430. Vermes is a prominent figure in contemporary historical Jesus research.
- Wallace-Murphy, Tim; Hopkins, Marilyn; Simmans, Graham (March 30, 2000). Rex Deus: The True Mystery of Rennes-le-Château and the Dynasty of Jesus. Element. ISBN 978-1862044722.
- Walvoord, John F. (1969). Jesus Christ Our Lord. Moody Press. ISBN 978-0802443250.
- Watchtower Bible (1991). The Greatest Man Who Ever Lived. New York, NY: Watch Tower Bible Tract Society of NY. ASIN B000FDXHFC. Official doctrine of the Jehovah's Witnesses.
- Wells, G. A. (1971). The Jesus of the Early Christians, a Study of Christian Origins. Pemberton Books. ISBN 978-0301710143.
- Wells, G. A. (December 19, 1994) [1974]. Did Jesus Exist? (2nd ed.). Amherst, NY: Prometheus Books. ISBN 978-0879753955.
- Wells, G. A. (1988) [1982]. The Historical Evidence for Jesus (2nd ed.). Amherst, NY: Prometheus Books. ISBN 978-0879754297.
- Wells, G. A. (April 1, 1989). Who Was Jesus? A Critique of the New Testament Record. Chicago, IL: Open Court Publishing Company. ISBN 978-0812690965.
- Wells, G. A. (November 1, 1996). The Jesus Legend. Chicago, IL: Open Court Publishing Company. ISBN 978-0812693348.
- Wells, G. A. (December 30, 1998). The Jesus Myth. Chicago, IL: Open Court Publishing Company. ISBN 978-0812693928.
- Wilson, A. N., Jesus: A Life (1992)
- Wilson, Ian (1997). Jesus: The Evidence. San Francisco, CA: Harper San Francisco. ISBN 978-0062514721.
- Witherington, Ben III (December 1995). The Jesus Quest: The Third Search for the Jew of Nazareth. InterVarsity Press. ISBN 978-0830818617.
- Wrede, William (December 1971). The Messianic Secret. Translated from the German by J. C. G. Greig. Cambridge: James Clarke & Co. Ltd. ISBN 978-0227677179. Original German publication 1901. Wrede was a prominent figure in early 20th century historical Jesus research.
- Wright, N. T. (November 14, 1996). Jesus and the Victory of God. London: SPCK Publishing. ISBN 978-0281050536. The second in a projected five or six volume series on Christian origins, dealing with the life and death of Christ from a very open evangelical perspective.
- Yancey, Philip (September 9, 1995). The Jesus I Never Knew. Nashville, TN: Thomas Nelson. ISBN 978-0310385707.
- Yoder, John H. (December 31, 1996) [1972]. The Politics of Jesus (2nd ed.). Grand Rapids, MI: William B. Eerdmans Publishing Co. ISBN 0-8028-0734-8.
- Zacharias, Ravi (August 8, 2000). Jesus Among Other Gods. W Publishing Group. ISBN 978-0849914379.

== 21st century ==
- Shmuley Boteach (2012), Kosher Jesus, Gefen Publishing House, ISBN 978-9652295781.
- The Life and Death of the Radical Historical Jesus, David Burns, 2013, Oxford University Press.
- A New Sensation by Jesus Christ, Beth Cook and Laurie Stimpson April 21, 2014 ISBN 978-1-4918-9847-5
- Akers, Keith (February 1, 2001). The Lost Religion of Jesus. New York, NY: Lantern Books. ISBN 978-1930051263.
- Baigent, Michael (May 2, 2006). The Jesus Papers: Exposing the Greatest Cover-up in History. San Francisco, CA: Harper Element. ISBN 978-0007236428.
- Bailey, Kenneth E. (2008). Jesus Through Middle Eastern Eyes. San Francisco, CA: InterVarsity Press. ISBN 978-0830825684.
- Bellinger, Gerhard J. (April 2009). Jesus: Leben – Wirken – Schicksal (in German). Books on Demand GmbH. ISBN 978-3-8370-3964-1.
- Benedict XVI, Pope (May 15, 2007). Jesus of Nazareth. New York City: Doubleday. ISBN 978-0-385-52341-7.
- Browne, Sylvia (November 7, 2006). The Mystical Life of Jesus: An Uncommon Perspective on the Life of Christ. New York, NY: Doubleday. ISBN 978-0525950011.
- Browne, Sylvia (November 6, 2007). The Two Marys: The Hidden History of the Mother and Wife of Jesus. USA: Dutton Adult. ISBN 978-0525950431.
- Bruce, Bryan (January 1, 2010). Jesus: The Cold Case : Reinvestigating the Death of the Most Famous Person in History. New Zealand: Random House New Zealand. ISBN 978-1869791971.
- Carotta, Francesco (August 31, 2003). Jesus Was Caesar. On the Julian Origin of Christianity. An Investigative Report. Soesterberg, NL: Aspekt BV. ISBN 978-9059113961.
- Caruana, Laurence (2013) [2007]. The Hidden Passion: A Novel of the Gnostic Christ, Based on the Nag Hammadi Texts (2nd ed.). Recluse Publishing. ISBN 978-0978263706.
- Freke, Timothy; Gandy, Peter (October 25, 2007). The Gospel of the Second Coming. London: Hay House. ISBN 978-1401915520.
- Gardner, Laurence (June 1, 2001) [1996]. Bloodline of the Holy Grail – The Hidden Lineage of Jesus Revealed (2nd ed.). Ottery St Mary, UK: Multi MediaQuest International. ISBN 978-1903773062.
- Gardner, Laurence (February 7, 2005). The Magdalene Legacy. The Jesus and Mary Bloodline Conspiracy, Revelations Beyond the Da Vinci Code. London: Harper Element. ISBN 978-0007200849.
- Gardner, Laurence (March 3, 2008). The Grail Enigma: The Hidden Heirs of Jesus and Mary Magdalene. London: Harper Element. ISBN 978-0007266944.
- Harpur, Tom (November 14, 2005). The Pagan Christ: Recovering the Lost Light. Canada: Thomas Allen & Son Limited. ISBN 978-0887621451.
- Hassnain, Fida (October 1, 2004) [1994]. A Search for the Historical Jesus. Down-to-Earth Books. ISBN 978-1878115171.
- Jacobovici, Simcha; Pellegrino, Charles (February 27, 2007). The Jesus Family Tomb: The Discovery, the Investigation, and the Evidence That Could Change History. New York, NY: HarperOne. ISBN 978-0061192029.
- Jordan Anthony J. Title A Jesus biography 2015. September 2015. ISBN 9780957622913
- Lincoln, Andrew T. (2013). Born of a Virgin?: reconceiving Jesus in the Bible, tradition, and theology. Grand Rapids, MI: Eerdmans. ISBN 9780802869258. OCLC 836206087.
- Longfellow, Ki (March 27, 2007). The Secret Magdalene: A Novel. Crown Publishing Group. ISBN 978-0307346667. A Gnostic view of His relationship with Mary Magdalene as well as His ministry.
- McLaren, Brian (April 4, 2006). The Secret Message of Jesus: Uncovering the Truth That Could Change Everything. Thomas Nelson. ISBN 978-0849900006.
- Meier, John P. (October 1, 2001). A Marginal Jew: Rethinking the Historical Jesus. Volume 3. New York, NY: Bantam Doubleday Dell. ISBN 978-0385469937. Volumes 1 and 2: 20th century.
- Meier, John P. (June 2, 2009). A Marginal Jew: Rethinking the Historical Jesus. Volume 4. New Haven, CT: Yale University Press. ISBN 978-0300140965.
- Mendenhall, George E. (April 1, 2001). Ancient Israel's Faith and History: An Introduction to the Bible in Context. Louisville, KY: Westminster John Knox Press. ISBN 978-0664223137. A less technical study than The Tenth Generation of the earliest traditions of Israel from linguistic and archaeological evidence which also treats the teachings and followers of Jesus in that context.
- Montgomery, Hugh (July 1, 2006). The God-Kings of Europe: The Descendents of Jesus Traced Through the Odonic and Davidic Dynasties. USA: Book Tree. ISBN 978-1585091096.
- O'Collins, Gerald (April 4, 2008). Jesus: A Portrait. Maryknoll, NY: Orbis Books. ISBN 978-1570757839.
- O'Collins, Gerald (July 9, 2009). Christology: A Biblical, Historical, and Systematic Study of Jesus (2nd ed.). Oxford: Oxford University Press. ISBN 978-0199557875.
- Ortberg, John (July 20, 2012). Who is this Man ? The Unpredictable Impact of the Inescapable Jesus (1st ed.). Nashville: Zondervan. ISBN 978-0310275947.
- Price, Robert M. (December 20, 2003). The Incredible Shrinking Son of Man: How Reliable Is the Gospel Tradition?. Amherst, NY: Prometheus Books. ISBN 978-1591021216.
- Pullman, Philip (April 1, 2010). The Good Man Jesus and the Scoundrel Christ. Edinburgh: Canongate Books. ISBN 978-1847678256.
- Pradhan, Tapan Kumar (March 25, 2021). Psalms of Love. New Delhi: Kohinoor Books. ISBN 978-8195254613.
- Schonfield, Hugh Joseph (April 1, 2004) [1965]. The Passover Plot. New Light on the History of Jesus (40th anniversary ed.). Disinformation Books. ISBN 978-1932857092.
- Shanks, Hershel; Witherington, Ben III (March 18, 2003). The Brother of Jesus: The Dramatic Story & Meaning of the First Archaeological Link to Jesus & His Family. San Francisco: HarperOne. ISBN 978-0060556600.
- Stott, John (October 1, 2004). The Incomparable Christ. Downers Grove, IL: IVP Books. ISBN 978-0830832224.
- Strobel, Lee (August 19, 2007). The Case for the Real Jesus. Grand Rapids, MI: Zondervan. ISBN 978-0310242109.
- Swanson, Vern Grosvenor (October 15, 2013) [2006]. Dynasty of the Holy Grail: Mormonism's Sacred Bloodline (Revised and expanded ed.). Cedar Fort. ISBN 978-1462111749.
- Tabor, James D. (April 4, 2006). The Jesus Dynasty: The Hidden History of Jesus, His Royal Family, and the Birth of Christianity. New York, NY: Simon & Schuster. ISBN 978-0743287234.
- Antony, Theodore (December 25, 2019). Jesus Christ in Love. New Delhi: Kohinoor Books. ISBN 978-8194283539.
- Thiede, Carsten Peter (May 18, 2003). Jesus: Man or Myth?. Oxford: Lion Books. ISBN 978-0745951478.
- Verhoeven, Paul (May 6, 2010). Jesus of Nazareth: A Realistic Portrait. Translated from the Dutch by Susan Massotty. New York, NY: Seven Stories Press. ISBN 978-1583229057. Original Dutch publication 2007.
- Wallace-Murphy, Tim; Hopkins, Marilyn (2005). Custodians Of Truth: The Continuance Of Rex Deus. Newburyport, MA: Red Wheel/Weiser. ASIN B000KBNAY2.
- Yancey, Philip (January 23, 2002). The Jesus I Never Knew. Nashville: Zondervan. ISBN 978-0310219231.
- Wills, Garry (March 2, 2006). What Jesus Meant. New York, NY: Viking Books. ISBN 978-0670034963.
- Wilson, Barrie (March 30, 2008). How Jesus Became Christian. Toronto: Random House of Canada. ISBN 978-0679314936.
- Wright, N T (March 13, 2012). How God Became King. San Francisco, CA: HarperOne. ISBN 978-0061730573.
- Yogananda, Paramahansa (September 30, 2004). The Second Coming of Christ: The Resurrection of the Christ Within You. USA: Self-Realization Fellowship. ISBN 978-0876125557.
- Aslan, Reza (16 July 2013). Zealot: The Life and Times of Jesus of Nazareth. USA: Random House. ISBN 978-1-4000-6922-4.
- Gott, Ken (November 13, 2024). The Magnificent Jesus. Rijswijk, NL: Public Transformation. ISBN 978-9493274136.

== Unknown date ==
- Putenis, A. K. Jesus, the Messiah. Minneapolis, MN: Fortress Press. Not before 1988, the date of foundation of Fortress Press. No further bibliographical information found online.

== Jesus as different from Paul the Apostle ==
- Maccoby, Hyam (March 6, 1986). The Mythmaker: Paul and the Invention of Christianity. NY, NY: Littlehampton Book Services. ISBN 978-0297788058.
- Wilson, Barrie A. (March 13, 2008). How Jesus Became Christian. London: Weidenfeld & Nicolson. ISBN 978-0297852001.

== Jesus Married? ==
Jacobovici, Simcha (2014). The Lost Gospel. New York: Pegasus. ISBN 978-1-60598-610-4.

== See also ==
- Cultural depictions of Jesus
