= Divine presence =

Concept in religion, spirituality, and theology

Divine presence, presence of God, Inner God, or simply presence is a concept in religion, spirituality, and theology that deals with the ability of a deity to be "present" with human beings, sometimes associated with omnipresence.

== Conceptualizations ==
The concept is shared by many religious traditions, is found in a number of independently derived conceptualizations, and each of these has culturally distinct terminology. Some of the various relevant concepts and terms are:

- Immanence – usually applied in monotheistic, pantheistic, pandeistic, or panentheistic faiths to suggest that the spiritual world permeates the mundane. It is often contrasted with transcendence, in which the divine is seen to be outside the material world.
- Inner light – in various religions, the presence of God as a "light". The Religious Society of Friends regards this concept as a fundamental belief.
- Divine light – an aspect of divine presence with qualities of illumination: thought, intellect, knowledge, insight, wisdom, being, divine love.
- Numen – Latin term for "presence", used historically to refer to a Roman religious concept.
- Divine embodiment – ritual identification with or embodiment of a deity
- Theophany – the appearance of a deity to a human.

== Abrahamic religions ==
=== Judaism ===
- Angel of the Presence – an entity variously considered angelic or else identified with God himself.
- Shekhinah – the dwelling or settling of the divine presence of God and his cosmic glory.

The Sages of Israel have given expression of the Divine Presence (Hebrew: Shekhinah) in their writings:

The Divine Presence rests not [upon man] through sadness, neither through sloth, nor through jesting, nor through levity, nor through loquacity, nor through [a host of] vain pursuits, but rather through the joyful performance of keeping one’s religious duty.

=== Christianity ===
- Immanuel – "God with us" is a Biblical concept that deals with the concept of divine presence, often used by Christians as a title for Jesus
- Incarnation (Christianity) – Believed of the second person of the Trinity, also known as God the Son or the Logos (Word), who "became flesh" by being conceived in the womb of Mary.

Christians generally take Matthew 18:20 to confirm Christ's presence when they meet in his name; cf. Catholic teaching according to the Second Vatican Council: "Christ is always present in His Church, especially in her liturgical celebrations". Christians also recognize a special presence of Christ in the Eucharist, although among varying denominations they differ about exactly how, where, and when Christ is present. While all agree that there is no perceptible change in the elements, some believe that they actually become the body and blood of Christ, others believe the true body and blood of Christ are really present in, with, and under the bread and wine which remain physically unchanged, others believe in a real but purely spiritual presence of Christ in the Eucharist, and still others take the act to be only a symbolic reenactment of the Last Supper.

- Transubstantiation – Catholic sacramental doctrine – Catholic concept of Christ fully, truly and substantially present in the Eucharist with the physical species being substantially absent.
- Consubstantiation – Christian theological doctrine – Lutheran concept of Christ being "infused" within the species of communion with these aspects still substantially present.

=== Islam (with Sufism) ===
Divine Presence in Islam is known as "Hadra" and the human experience of it is known as "Hudur".

Practices in Sufism intended to evoke Hudur usually characterize it as "the heart's presence with Allah" ("Hudur al-Qalb"). Examples of such practices include:

- The Haḍra group ritual
- Muraqabah (meditation) in general
- Realization of the Jism Latif subtle body through practice with the Lataif-e-Sitta

== Indian religions ==
In Hinduism, an avatar is the appearance or incarnation of a deity on Earth.

== See also ==
- Divine embodiment
- Divine illumination
- Divine spark
- Incarnation
- Inward light
- Logos (Christianity)
- The Kingdom of God Is Within You

== Bibliography ==
- Borgen, Peder. Early Christianity and Hellenistic Judaism. Edinburgh: T & T Clark Publishing. 1996.
- Brown, Raymond. An Introduction to the New Testament. New York: Doubleday. 1997.
- Dunn, J. D. G. Christology in the Making. London: SCM Press. 1989.
- Dupuis, Jacques. Christianity and the Religions. Maryknoll, NY: Orbis. 2002.
- Ferguson, Everett. Backgrounds in Early Christianity. Grand Rapids: Eerdmans Publishing. 1993.
- Greene, Colin J. D. Christology in Cultural Perspective: Marking Out the Horizons. Grand Rapids: InterVarsity Press. Eerdmans Publishing. 2003.
- Letham, Robert. The Work of Christ. Downers Grove: InterVarsity Press. 1993.
- Macleod, Donald. The Person of Christ. Downers Grove: InterVarsity Press. 1998.
- McGrath, Alister. Historical Theology: An Introduction to the History of Christian Thought. Oxford: Blackwell Publishing. 1998.
- Kenny, Charles (1882). "6. On the Presence of God" . Half-Hours With The Saints and Servants of God. Burns and Oats.
- Macquarrie, J. Jesus Christ in Modern Thought. London: SCM Press. 1990.
- Neusner, Jacob. From Politics to Piety: The Emergence of Pharisaic Judaism. Providence, R. I.: Brown University. 1973.
- Norris, Richard A. Jr. The Christological Controversy. Philadelphia: Fortress Press. 1980.
- O'Collins, Gerald. Christology: A Biblical, Historical, and Systematic Study of Jesus. Oxford:Oxford University Press. 2009.
- _______ Jesus: A Portrait. London: Darton, Longman & Todd. 2008.
- _______ Salvation for All: God's Other Peoples. Oxford:Oxford University Press. 2008.
- Pelikan, Jaroslav. Development of Christian Doctrine: Some Historical Prolegomena. London: Yale University Press. 1969.
- _______ The Emergence of the Catholic Tradition (100-600). Chicago: University of Chicago Press. 1971.
- Rahner, Karl. Foundations of Christian Faith, trans. W.V. Dych. London: Darton, Longman & Todd. 1978.
- Tyson, John R. Invitation to Christian Spirituality: An Ecumenical Anthology. New York: Oxford University Press. 1999.
