= Biblical conspiracy theory =

Biblical conspiracy theories posit that much of what is believed about the Bible is a deception created to suppress a secret or ancient truth. Such conspiracy theories may claim that Jesus actually had a wife and children, or that a group such as the Priory of Sion has secret information about the true descendants of Jesus; some claim that there was a secret movement to censor books that truly belonged in the Bible, etc.

This subject should not be confused with deliberately fictional Bible conspiracy theories. A number of bestselling modern novels, the most popular of which was The Da Vinci Code, have incorporated elements of Bible conspiracy theories to flesh out their storylines, rather than to push these theories as actual suggestions.

== Common theories ==
=== Christ myth theory ===
Some proponents of the Jesus-myth or Christ-myth theory consider that the whole of Christianity is a conspiracy. American author Acharya S (Dorothy Murdock) in The Christ Conspiracy: The Greatest Story Ever Sold (1999) argues that Jesus and Christianity were created by members of various secret societies, mystery schools, and religions, that these people drew on numerous myths and rituals which existed previously, and that the church then constructed these ideas into Christianity by suppressing the originally intended understanding. In the 1930s British spiritualist Hannen Swaffer's home circle, following the teachings of the native-American spirit "Silver Birch", also claimed a Jesus-myth.

=== Church suppression of reincarnation conspiracy ===
Some New Age believers consider that Jesus taught reincarnation but the Christian Church suppressed it. Geddes MacGregor in Reincarnation in Christianity (1978) suggests that Origen's texts written in support of the belief in reincarnation somehow disappeared or were suppressed.

=== Jesus, Mary Magdalene and the Holy Grail ===
Some common hypotheses are that:

- Mary Magdalene was one of the apostles of Jesus, possibly even the only disciple, but this was suppressed by the early Church.
- Jesus had an intimate relationship with Mary Magdalene which may or may not have resulted in marriage or children; their continued bloodline is then said to be Christianity's deepest secret.

The Holy Blood and the Holy Grail, by Michael Baigent, Richard Leigh and Henry Lincoln (1982) is seen by many as the source of that plotline in The Da Vinci Code.

=== Resurrected Jesus as an impostor ===
The Gospel of Afranius, an atheistic Russian work that came out in English in 2022, proposes politically motivated gaslighting as the origin of the foundational Christian belief in the resurrection of Jesus.

== Books ==
- The Gospel of Afranius
- The Jesus Papers: Exposing the Greatest Cover-Up in History, Michael Baigent (2006)
- Jesus the Magician: Charlatan or Son of God?, Morton Smith (1978)
- The Jesus Dynasty, James Tabor (2006)
- Jesus the Man: New Interpretations from the Dead Sea Scrolls, Barbara Thiering (1993)
- The Jesus Scroll, Donovan Joyce (1972)
- Holy Blood, Holy Grail, Michael Baigent, Richard Leigh, and Henry Lincoln (1982)
- The Templar Revelation, Lynn Picknett and Clive Prince (1997)
- The Jesus Mysteries: Was the "Original Jesus" a Pagan God?, Timothy Freke and Peter Gandy (1999)
- The Jesus Conspiracy: The Turin Shroud and the Truth About the Resurrection, Holger Kersten and Elmar R. Gruber (1994)
- History of the First Council of Nice: A World's Christian Convention, A.D. 325; With a Life of Constantine, Dean Dudley (1880)

== See also ==
- Bible code
- Caesar's Messiah
- Constantinian shift
- Criticism of the Bible
- Forged: Writing in the Name of God – Why the Bible's Authors Are Not Who We Think They Are
- Gospel of Judas
- Holy Grail
- Islamic view of the Christian Bible
- Panbabylonism
- The True Word
- The Two Babylons
- Tiberius Julius Abdes Pantera
- Toledot Yeshu
- Zeitgeist (film series)
