= Criticism of the Bible =

Criticism of the Bible, the collection of religious texts held to be sacred by Christianity, Judaism, Samaritanism, and other Abrahamic religions, often concerns the text's factual accuracy, moral tenability, and supposed inerrancy claimed by biblical literalists. There remain questions of biblical authorship and what material to include in the biblical canon. Christian fundamentalists regard the Bible as the perfect word of God; fundamentalist Jews hold the Hebrew Bible in similar high regard.

Modern scholarship holds that most biblical books are of unknown or multiple authorship and combine tradition, myth, and polemic rather than strict history. Critics note biblical inconsistencies and textual issues. Bible translation involves interpretive choices and manuscript differences, leading to debates over accuracy and meaning. Archaeological evidence supports few Old Testament events and challenges many others. Critics argue that the Bible's early narratives, including the Genesis, the Exodus, and the united monarchy, are historically and scientifically inaccurate, as evidence from archaeology, geology, astronomy, biology, and genetics contradicts literal interpretations. Though Jesus is broadly agreed to have existed, the details of his historicity are also debated.

Philosophers Elizabeth S. Anderson and Simon Blackburn argue that the Bible is morally inconsistent, citing passages they describe as endorsing slavery, genocide, misogyny, violence, and other unethical practices.

== Authorship ==
At the end of the 17th century, only a few Bible scholars doubted that Moses wrote the Torah (also known as the Pentateuch, traditionally called the "Five Books of Moses"), such as Thomas Hobbes, Isaac La Peyrère and Baruch Spinoza, but in the late 18th century some scholars such as Jean Astruc (1753) began to systematically question his authorship. By the end of the 19th century, some such as Julius Wellhausen and Abraham Kuenen went as far as to claim that as a whole the work was of many more authors over many centuries from 1000 BC (the time of David) to 500 BC (the time of Ezra) and that the history it contained was often more polemical rather than strictly factual. By the first half of the 20th century, Hermann Gunkel had drawn attention to mythic aspects, and Albrecht Alt, Martin Noth, and the tradition history school argued that although its core traditions had genuinely ancient roots, the narratives were fictional framing devices and were not intended as history in the modern sense.

The modern consensus amongst Bible scholars is that the vast majority of the authors of books of the Bible are unknown. Most of them are written anonymously, and only some of the 27 books of the New Testament mention an author, some of which are probably or known to be pseudepigrapha, meaning they were written by someone other than whom the author said he was. The anonymous books have traditionally been attributed authors, though none of these, such as the "Five Books of Moses", or the four canonical gospels "according to Matthew, Mark, Luke, and John" have appeared to stand up under scrutiny. Only the 7 undisputed Pauline epistles appear to have most likely been written by Paul the Apostle, the Book of Revelation by John of Patmos (not by John the Apostle, nor by the author(s) of the other 'Johannine literature'). Scholars disagree whether Paul wrote the "Deutero-Pauline epistles" and whether Simon Peter wrote First Epistle of Peter; all other New Testament books that mention an author are most likely forgeries. Though, for the Pastorals, this can be a result of mainly a passing down the tradition of "scholarly consensus" vs. merited by the evidence.

In the 2nd century, the gnostics often claimed that their form of Christianity was the first, and they regarded Jesus as a teacher or an allegorical figure. Elaine Pagels has proposed that there are several examples of gnostic attitudes in the Pauline epistles. Bart D. Ehrman and Raymond E. Brown note that some of the Pauline epistles are widely regarded by scholars as pseudonymous, and it is the view of Timothy Freke, and others, that this involved a forgery in an attempt by the Church to bring in Paul's gnostic supporters and turn the arguments in the other epistles on their head.

== Canonicity ==
Specific collections of biblical writings, such as the Hebrew Bible and Christian Bibles, are considered sacred and authoritative by their respective faith groups. The limits of the canon were effectively set by the proto-orthodox churches from the 1st throughout the 4th century; however, the status of the scriptures has been a topic of scholarly discussion in the later churches. Increasingly, the biblical works have been subjected to literary and historical criticism in an effort to interpret the biblical texts, independent of churches and dogmatic influences.

In the middle of the second century, Marcion of Sinope proposed rejecting the entire Jewish Bible. He considered the God portrayed therein to be a lesser deity, a demiurge, and that the law of Moses was contrived. A similar view is referred to as Jesuism, which does not affirm the scriptural authority of any biblical text other than the teachings of Jesus in the Gospels.

Judaism discount the New Testament and Old Testament deuterocanonicals. They, along with most Christians, also discredit the legitimacy of New Testament apocrypha.

== Ethics ==
Elizabeth Anderson, a professor of philosophy and women's studies at the University of Michigan, Ann Arbor, states that "the Bible contains both good and evil teachings", and it is "morally inconsistent".

Anderson criticizes commands she interprets that God gave to men in the Old Testament, such as: kill adulterers, homosexuals, and "people who work on the Sabbath" (Leviticus 20:10; Leviticus 20:13; Exodus 35:2, respectively); to commit ethnic cleansing (Exodus 34:11–14, Leviticus 26:7–9); commit genocide (Numbers 21: 2–3, Numbers 21:33–35, Deuteronomy 2:26–35, and Joshua 1–12); and other mass killings. Anderson considers the Bible to permit slavery, the beating of slaves, the rape of female captives in wartime, polygamy (for men), the killing of prisoners, and child sacrifice. She also provides several examples to illustrate what she considers "God's moral character": "Routinely punishes people for the sins of others ... punishes all mothers by condemning them to painful childbirth", punishes four generations of descendants of those who worship other gods, kills 24,000 Israelites because some of them sinned (Numbers 25:1–9), kills 70,000 Israelites for the sin of David in 2 Samuel 24:10–15, and "sends two bears out of the woods to tear forty-two children to pieces" because they called someone names in 2 Kings 2:23–24.

Anderson criticizes what she terms morally repugnant lessons of the New Testament. She claims that "Jesus tells us his mission is to make family members hate one another, so that they shall love him more than their kin" (Matthew 10:35–37), that "Disciples must hate their parents, siblings, wives, and children (Luke 14:26)", and that Peter and Paul elevate men over their wives "who must obey their husbands as gods" (1 Corinthians 11:3, 1 Corinthians 14:34–35, Ephesians 5:22–24, Colossians 3:18, 1 Timothy 2:11–12, 1 Peter 3:1). Anderson states that the Gospel of John implies that "infants and anyone who never had the opportunity to hear about Christ are damned [to hell], through no fault of their own".

Simon Blackburn states that the "Bible can be read as giving us a carte blanche for harsh attitudes to children, the mentally handicapped, animals, the environment, the divorced, unbelievers, people with various sexual habits, and elderly women".

Blackburn criticizes what he terms morally suspect themes of the New Testament. He notes some "moral quirks" of Jesus: that he could be "sectarian" (Matthew 10:5–6), racist (Matthew 15:26 and Mark 7:27), and placed no value on animal life (Luke 8:27–33).

Blackburn provides examples of Old Testament moral criticisms, such as the phrase in Exodus 22:18, ("Thou shalt not suffer a witch to live.") which he says has "helped to burn alive tens or hundreds of thousands of women in Europe and America". He states that the Old Testament God apparently has "no problems with a slave-owning society", considers birth control a crime punishable by death, and "is keen on child abuse". Additional examples that are questioned today are the prohibition on touching women during their "period of menstrual uncleanliness (Leviticus 15:19–24)", the apparent approval of selling daughters into slavery (Exodus 21:7), and the obligation to put to death someone working on the Sabbath (Exodus 35:2).

== Historicity ==
The historicity of the Bible is the question of the Bible's "acceptability as a history".

Archaeological discoveries since the 19th century are open to interpretation, but broadly speaking they lend support to few of the Old Testament's narratives as history and offer evidence to challenge others.

Biblical minimalism is a label applied to a loosely knit group of scholars who hold that the Bible's version of history is not supported by any archaeological evidence so far unearthed, thus the Bible cannot be trusted as a history source. Author Richard I. Pervo details the non-historical sources of the Book of Acts.

=== Historicity of Jesus ===
The validity of the Gospels is challenged by writers like Kersey Graves and Gerald Massey, who argue that the story of Jesus incorporates elements from mythic tales, such as those of Horus and Greek myths. Comparative mythology examines these parallels and suggests that Christianity may be based on a mythical creation rather than a historical figure. Some critics propose that Jesus was the Jewish manifestation of a Pan-Hellenic cult known as Osiris-Dionysus.

Christ myth theory proponents claim that the age, authorship, and authenticity of the Gospels can not be verified, thus the Gospels can not bear witness to the historicity of Jesus. This is in contrast with writers such as David Strauss, who regarded only the supernatural elements of the gospels as myth, but whereas these supernatural myths were a point of contention, there was no refutation of the gospels' authenticity as a witness to the historicity of Jesus. Critics of the Gospels such as Richard Dawkins and Thomas Henry Huxley note that they were written long after the death of Jesus and that we have no real knowledge of the date of composition of the Gospels. Annie Besant and Thomas Paine note that the authors of the Gospels are not known.

In modern scholarship, the Christ myth theory is considered a fringe theory and is dismissed by virtually every scholar.

== Internal consistency ==
There are many places in the Bible in which inconsistencies—such as different numbers and names for the same feature, and different sequences for the same events—have been alleged and presented by critics as difficulties. Responses to these criticisms include the modern documentary hypothesis, the two-source hypothesis, and theories that the pastoral epistles are pseudonymous.

However, authors such as Raymond Brown have presented arguments that the Gospels contradict each other in various important respects and on various important details. W. D. Davies and E. P. Sanders state that: "on many points, especially about Jesus' early life, the evangelists were ignorant ... they simply did not know, and, guided by rumour, hope or supposition, did the best they could". Yet, E.P. Sanders has also opined, "The dominant view today seems to be that we can know pretty well what Jesus was out to accomplish, that we can know a lot about what he said, and that those two things make sense within the world of first-century Judaism." More critical scholars see the nativity stories either as completely fictional accounts, or at least constructed from traditions that predate the Gospels.

For example, many versions of the Bible specifically point out that the most reliable early manuscripts and other ancient witnesses did not include Mark 16:9–20, i.e., the Gospel of Mark originally ended at Mark 16:8, and additional verses were added a few hundred years later. This is known as the "Markan Appendix".

Some authors, on contrary, argue that the Markan Appendix is the original and genuine ending of Mark's gospel. The case for authenticity can be made based on patristic evidence:

All of the patristic evidence shows clearly that the longer ending of Mark was widely used and widely accepted as authoritative from the second through the fourth century. Much of this evidence predates the manuscripts Sinaiticus and Vaticanus. Because canonicity was not so easily attained without strong tradition supporting apostolic or prophetic authorship, this evidence strongly supports the idea that we should seriously consider Mark 16:9-20 as the original ending of Mark’s gospel.

With regards to the Old Testament, there is an error in 2 Kings 8:26 where it says Ahaziah of Judah was 22 when he became king, but in 2 Chronicles 22:2 it says he was 42 when he began to reign. According to some Christian apologists one of the explanations to this would be that he first reigned at 22 as is stated in 2 Kings 8:26, was then kidnapped by the Arabians and Philistines for 20 years and then came back to the throne at 42, as is stated in 2 Chronicles 2:22. In other transcripts of 2 Chronicles, such as in the Septuagint, it states that he reigned for 20 years instead of 42. This suggests a possible translation error.

== Translation issues ==
Translation of scripture into the vernacular (such as English and hundreds of other languages), though a common phenomenon, is also a subject of debate and criticism. For readability, clarity, or other reasons, translators may choose different wording or sentence structure, and some translations may choose to paraphrase passages. Because many of the words in the original language have ambiguous or difficult to translate meanings, debates over correct interpretation occur. For instance, at creation (Gen 1:2), is רוח אלהים (ruach 'elohiym) the "wind of god", "spirit of god" (i.e., the Holy Spirit in Christianity), or a "mighty wind" over the primordial deep? In Hebrew, רוח (ruach) can mean "wind", "breath" or "spirit". Both ancient and modern translators are divided over this and many other such ambiguities. Another example is the word used in the Masoretic Text to indicate the woman who would bear Immanuel is alleged to mean a young, unmarried woman in Hebrew, while Matthew 1:23 follows the Septuagint version of the passage that uses the Greek word parthenos, translated virgin, and is used to support the Christian idea of virgin birth. Those who view the Masoretic Text, which forms the basis of most English translations of the Old Testament, as being more accurate than the Septuagint, and trust its usual translation, may see this as an inconsistency, whereas those who take the Septuagint to be accurate may not.

More recently, several discoveries of ancient manuscripts such as the Dead Sea Scrolls, and Codex Sinaiticus, have led to modern translations like the New International Version differing somewhat from the older ones such as the 17th century King James Version, removing verses not present in the earliest manuscripts (see List of omitted Bible verses), some of which are acknowledged as interpolations, such as the Comma Johanneum, others having several highly variant versions in very important places, such as the resurrection scene in Mark 16. The King-James-Only Movement rejects these changes and upholds the King James Version as the most accurate.

In a 1973 Journal of Biblical Literature article, Philip B. Harner, Professor Emeritus of Religion at Heidelberg College, claimed that the traditional translation of John 1:1c ("and the Word was God" and one of the most frequently cited verses to support the doctrine of the Trinity) is incorrect. He endorses the New English Bible translation of John 1:1c, "and what God was, the Word was."

== The Bible and science ==
Common points of criticism against the Bible are targeted at the Genesis creation narrative, Genesis flood narrative, and the Tower of Babel. According to young Earth creationism, flat earth theory, and geocentrism, which all take a literal view of the book of Genesis, the universe, and all forms of life on Earth were created directly by God roughly 6,000 years ago, a global flood killed almost all life on Earth, and the diversity of languages originated from God confusing his people, who were in the process of constructing a large tower. These assertions, however, are contradicted by contemporary research in disciplines, such as archaeology, astronomy, biology, chemistry, geoscience, and physics. For instance, cosmological evidence suggests that the universe is approximately 13.8 billion years old. Analyses of the geological time scale date the Earth to be 4.5 billion years old. Developments in astronomy show the Solar System formed in a protoplanetary disk roughly 4.6 billion years ago. Physics and cosmology show that the Universe expanded, at a rapid rate, from quantum fluctuations in a process known as the Big Bang. Research within biology, chemistry, physics, astronomy, and geology has provided sufficient evidence to show life originated over 4 billion years ago through chemical processes. Countless fossils present throughout the fossil record, as well as research in molecular biology, genetics, anatomy, physiology, zoology, and other life sciences show all living organisms evolved over billions of years and share a common ancestry. Archaeological excavations have expanded human history, with material evidence of ancient cultures older than 6,000 years old. Moreover, 6,000 years is not enough time to account for the current amount of genetic variation in humans. If all humans were descended from two individuals that lived less than 10,000 years ago, it would require an impossibly high rate of mutation to reach humanity's current level of genetic diversity.

The argument that the literal story of Genesis can qualify as science collapses on three major grounds: the creationists' need to invoke miracles in order to compress the events of the earth's history into the biblical span of a few thousand years; their unwillingness to abandon claims clearly disproved, including the assertion that all fossils are products of Noah's flood; and their reliance upon distortion, misquote, half-quote, and citation out of context to characterize the ideas of their opponents.

— Bully for Brontosaurus by Stephen Jay Gould

According to one of the world's leading biblical archaeologists, William G. Dever,

Archaeology certainly doesn't prove literal readings of the Bible...It calls them into question, and that's what bothers some people. Most people really think that archaeology is out there to prove the Bible. No archaeologist thinks so. ... From the beginnings of what we call biblical archeology, perhaps 150 years ago, scholars, mostly western scholars, have attempted to use archeological data to prove the Bible. And for a long time it was thought to work. William Albright, the great father of our discipline, often spoke of the "archeological revolution." Well, the revolution has come but not in the way that Albright thought. The truth of the matter today is that archeology raises more questions about the historicity of the Hebrew Bible and even the New Testament than it provides answers, and that's very disturbing to some people.

Dever also wrote:

Archaeology as it is practiced today must be able to challenge, as well as confirm, the Bible stories. Some things described there really did happen, but others did not. The biblical narratives about Abraham, Moses, Joshua and Solomon probably reflect some historical memories of people and places, but the 'larger than life' portraits of the Bible are unrealistic and contradicted by the archaeological evidence....

I am not reading the Bible as Scripture… I am in fact not even a theist. My view all along—and especially in the recent books—is first that the biblical narratives are indeed 'stories', often fictional and almost always propagandistic, but that here and there they contain some valid historical information...

According to Dever, the scholarly consensus is that the figure of Moses is legendary, and not historical. However, he states that a "Moses-like figure" may have existed somewhere in the southern Transjordan in the mid-13th century BC.

Tel Aviv University archaeologist Ze'ev Herzog wrote in the Haaretz newspaper:

This is what archaeologists have learned from their excavations in the Land of Israel: the Israelites were never in Egypt, did not wander in the desert, did not conquer the land in a military campaign and did not pass it on to the 12 tribes of Israel. Perhaps even harder to swallow is that the united monarchy of David and Solomon, which is described by the Bible as a regional power, was at most a small tribal kingdom. And it will come as an unpleasant shock to many that the God of Israel, YHWH, had a female consort and that the early Israelite religion adopted monotheism only in the waning period of the monarchy and not at Mount Sinai.

Israel Finkelstein told The Jerusalem Post that Jewish archaeologists have found no historical or archaeological evidence to back the narrative of the Jews' wandering in Sinai, Joshua's conquest of Canaan or the Exodus. Professor Yoni Mizrahi, an independent archaeologist who has worked with the International Atomic Energy Agency, agreed with Finkelstein.

== See also ==
- Bible conspiracy theory
- Bible desecration
- Biblical criticism
- Bibliolatry
- Christian views on slavery
- Christianity and violence
- Christianity and domestic violence
- Criticism of Christianity
- Criticism of Jesus
- Criticism of the Book of Mormon
- Criticism of the Quran
- Criticism of the Talmud
- Historical criticism (higher criticism)
- The Bible and violence
- Women in Christianity
