= Resurrection Summit =

1996 meeting of biblical scholars

The Resurrection Summit was a meeting held at St. Joseph's Seminary, New York, 7 to 11 April 1996. The summit gathered international biblical scholars in order to discuss the Christian belief that God raised Jesus from the dead.

One of the organizers of the summit was Gerald O'Collins, who, at the time, was a theology professor at the Pontifical Gregorian University in Rome. The summit papers were later compiled into a book. In his reflection upon the summit Wilkins noted that the essays offered a reply to the conclusions of the Jesus Seminar.

== Book ==
The book, called The Resurrection: An Interdisciplinary Symposium on the Resurrection of Jesus, was edited by S. T. Davis, D. Kendall and G. O'Collins, and included contributions from Alan Segal, Janet Soskice, Brian Johnstone, Richard Swinburne, Stephen Davis, Marguerite Shuster, William Craig, William Alston, Carey Newman, Sarah Coakley, John Wilkens, Gerald O'Collins, Peter Carnley, Alan Padgett and Francis Schüssler Fiorenza.

According to Nineham the main concern of the book was "with the objective reality of Resurrection and the risen Christ". The chapters included contributions from biblical studies, systematic theology, the philosophy of religion, homiletics, liturgy, fundamental theology, the study of religious art, apologetics, and literary criticism.

In his review of the book Carson noted that "the volume remains a useful reflection of the breadth of current discussion about the resurrection of Jesus". Mathewes noted that "the essays range from polemics, through positive arguments for the reality of the Resurrection, to discussions of its proper theological significance".
