= Jacques Dupuis =

Jacques Dupuis may refer to:

- Jacques Dupuis (Jesuit) (1923–2004), Belgian Jesuit priest
- Jacques Dupuis (politician) (b. 1948), member of the National Assembly of Quebec
- Jacques Dupuis (violinist) (1830–1870) Belgian violinist and composer
- Jacques Dupuis (architect) (1914–1984)
