= The God Who Riots =

2022 book by Damon Garcia

The God Who Riots: Taking Back the Radical Jesus
- Cover art for the first edition of the book
- Editor: Lisa Kloskin
- Author: Damon Garcia
- Cover artist: Jeff Miller of Faceout Studios
- Language: English
- Genre: Christian literature
- Publisher: Broadleaf Books
- Publication date: August 23, 2022
- Publication place: United States of America
- Pages: 194
- ISBN: 1-506-48037-3
- OCLC: 1292971910
- Website: www.broadleafbooks.com/store/productgroup/2050/The-God-Who-Riots

The God Who Riots: Taking Back the Radical Jesus is the first book written by public theologian and YouTuber Damon Garcia, which was published by the 1517 Media imprint Broadleaf Books on August 23, 2022. In the book, Garcia argues in favor of church reforms, liberation theology, and greater support for the poor and oppressed.

== Background ==
The God Who Riots was written by Damon Garcia and published by Broadleaf Books on August 23, 2022. The premise of the book is that Christianity can be used to create positive change or to perpetuate the way things are in the world. Throughout the book, Garcia demonstrates that both tendencies are supported within Christian tradition, despite the apparent tension between the two. The book uses both a theological and economic framing to argue that Capitalism commodifies and dehumanizes people with significant prejudice toward the poor. The book suggests that Christianity can act as an alternative system to Capitalism despite its own negative history. The book provides both historical and Biblical context for its arguments and references a variety of theologians such as Paulo Freire and John Calvin. Garcia says that his upbringing among conservative Christians led him to his current beliefs rather than the rejection Christianity altogether, and throughout the book he expresses opposition to Conservative Christianity. He argues that God is with the people on the streets, the poor, and the oppressed who are working to create positive changes in the world. Garcia encourages Christians to oppose Capitalism and to abolish systems of injustice and oppression. The book examines the tensions within evangelicalism in the United States and argues for church reforms, liberation theology, and greater support for the poor.

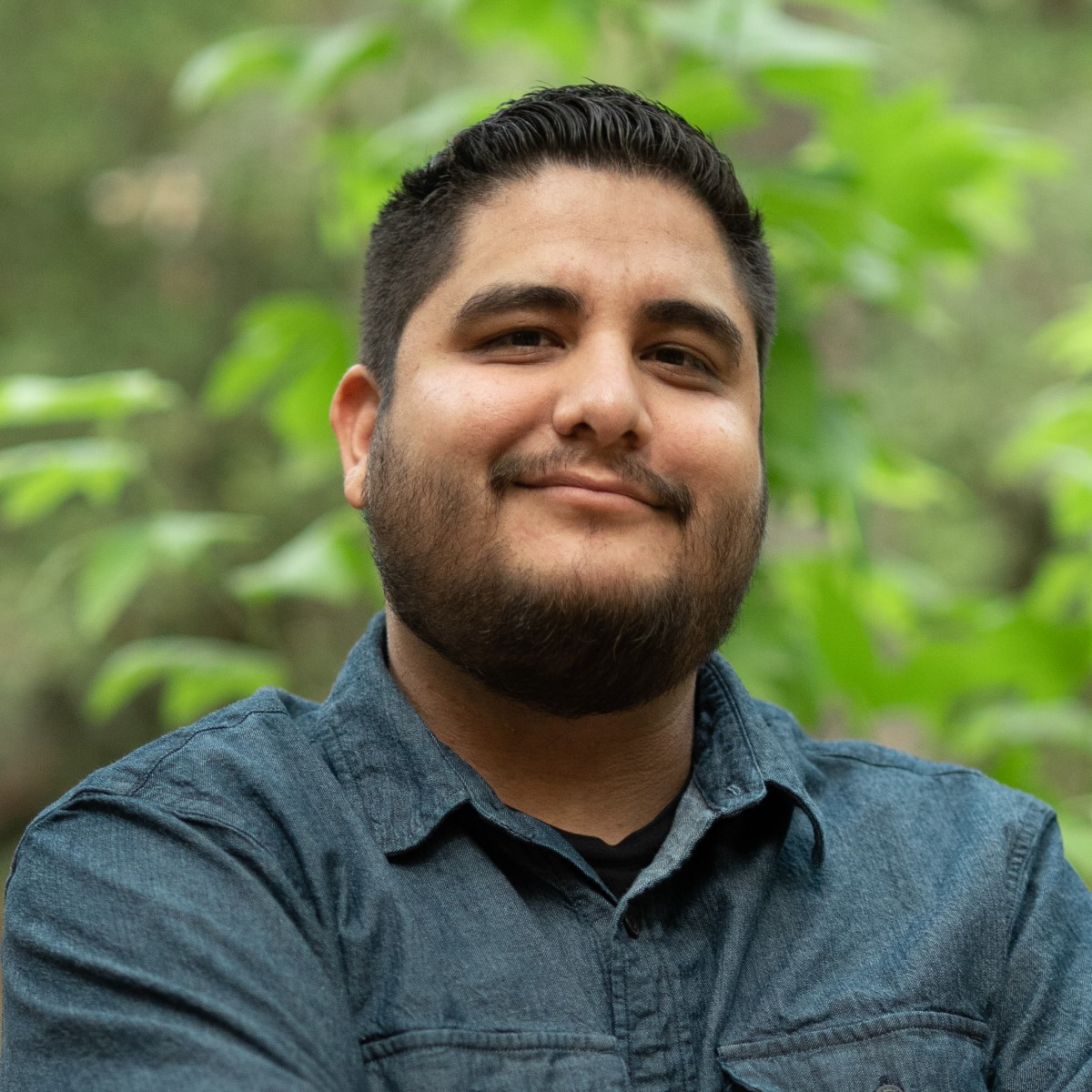
Damon Garcia, the author of the book.

Garcia is a public theologian and YouTuber. The book is Garcia's first published work and is 194 pages and 10 chapters long. The book's acquisition editor was Lisa Kloskin. Garcia did a book launch and Q&A on August 23, 2022, in Santa Barbara, CA. The book discusses how Christianity has harmed people through things like colonialism.

== Reception ==
Karen González wrote in Sojourners that "Garcia makes complex concepts accessible yet still resonant and challenging." Jacqueline Parascandola wrote in Library Journal that "Garcia offers a guide to social change with an accessible and easy-to-understood model." The Publishers Weekly review said that "Garcia thoughtfully examines such topics as wealth inequality, LGBTQ rights, and colonialism through a Christian lens." Jenny Hamilton wrote in Booklist that the book is an "accessible, impassioned debut."

== See also ==
- The Life and Death of the Radical Historical Jesus
- The Cross and the Lynching Tree
- Jesus and John Wayne
