= Errors in the Bible =

Errors in the Bible may refer to:

- Bible errata, accidents in printing, copying, and translating
- Criticism of the Bible regarding its factual accuracy, ethics, or internal inconsistencies
- Biblical inerrancy, a disputed doctrine asserting the Bible contains no errors
