= Redeemer (Christianity) =

Title given to Jesus in Christian theology

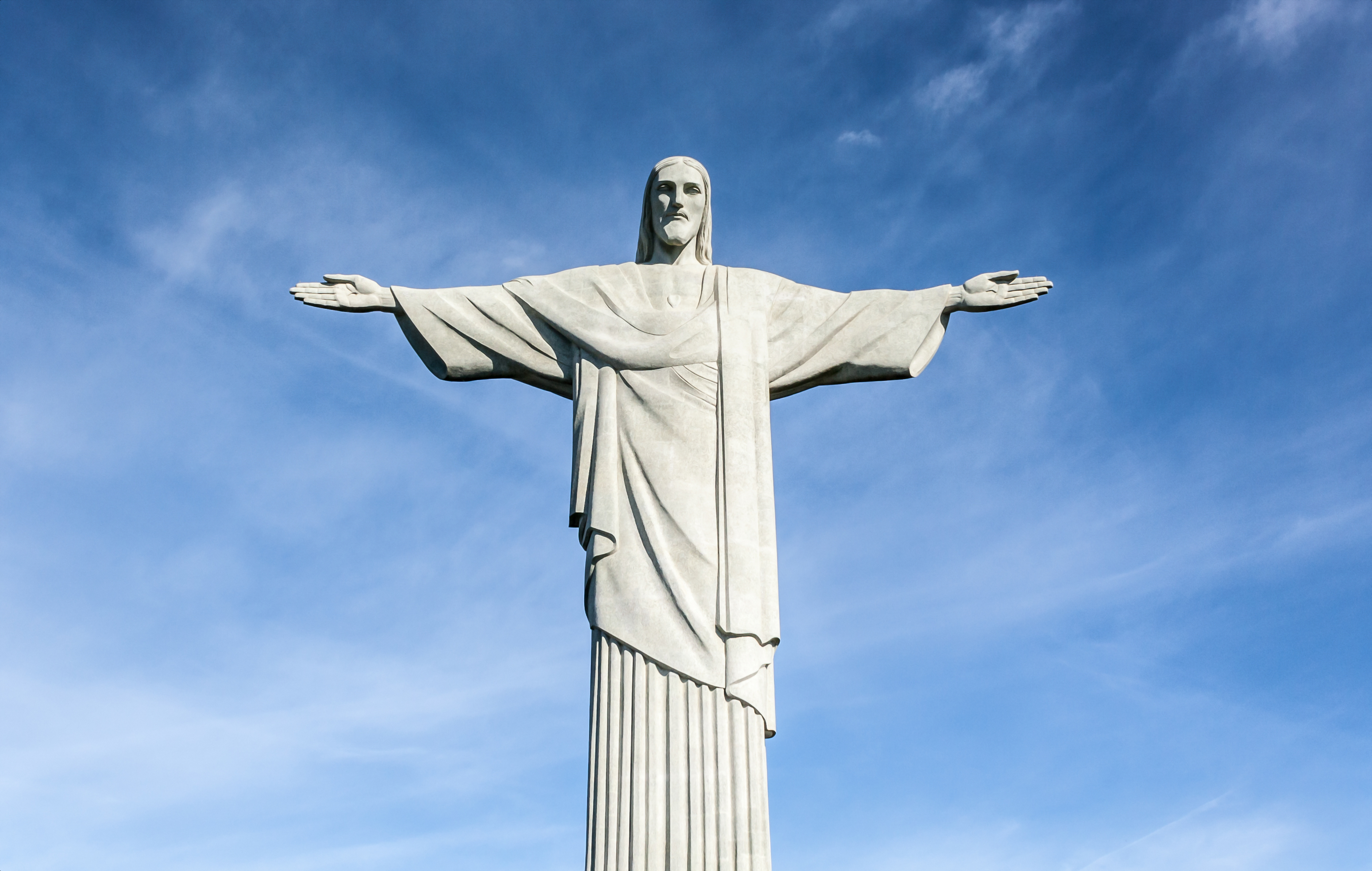
Christ the Redeemer statue in Rio de Janeiro, Brazil. The statue is an iconic image of Jesus Christ with his arms outstretched, representing his message of love and redemption for all people.

In Christian theology, Jesus Christ is sometimes referred to using the title Redeemer or Saviour (alternatively, Savior), referencing the Christian belief that Jesus redeemed the sins of humanity through his ministry, death and resurrection, allowing for people to attain salvation. In the New Testament, redemption can refer both to deliverance from sin and to freedom from captivity.

Although the Gospels do not use the title "Redeemer", the idea of redemption occurs in several of Paul's epistles. Leon Morris says that "Paul uses the concept of redemption primarily to speak of the saving significance of the death of Christ."

== Universality ==
The New Testament speaks of Christ as the one saviour for all people. The First Epistle of John says that Jesus is "the propitiation for our sins and not for ours only but also for the sins of the world" (1 John 2:2). Adherents of unlimited atonement interpret this to mean that Jesus' redemptive role is for all people without exception, while adherents of limited atonement interpret it as being available to all yet would work itself out in only the elect.

Early Christian communities also came to recognize Jesus' redemptive role to be unique (without parallel), complete (as one who conveys the fullness of salvation), and definitive (beyond any possibility of being equaled, let alone surpassed, in his salvific function). Central to this belief was the idea that through Jesus, the powers of evil were overcome, sin was forgiven, spiritual and moral corruption was cleansed, and a new way of life became possible. This new life was described as a restored relationship with God, often understood as being adopted as God's children. This understanding is reflected in early Christian texts. In the Old Testament, the title "saviour" is sometimes applied to human figures such as military leaders (e.g., Judges 3: 9, 3:15, and 3:31). In contrast, the New Testament applies the title only to God, eight times, and to Christ, sixteen times.

== See also ==
- Christian universalism
- Christology
- Goel (Judaism)
- Jesus as the Logos
- Jesus in Christianity
- Messiah § Christianity
- Names and titles of Jesus in the New Testament
- Second Adam
- Co-Redemptrix, preservative redemption (about the Virgin Mary)

== Bibliography ==
- Borgen, Peder. Early Christianity and Hellenistic Judaism. Edinburgh: T & T Clark Publishing. 1996.
- Brown, Raymond. An Introduction to the New Testament. New York: Doubleday. 1997.
- Dunn, J. D. G. Christology in the Making. London: SCM Press. 1989.
- Ferguson, Everett. Backgrounds in Early Christianity. Grand Rapids: Eerdmans Publishing. 1993.
- Greene, Colin J. D. Christology in Cultural Perspective: Marking Out the Horizons. Grand Rapids: InterVarsity Press. Eerdmans Publishing. 2003.
- Holt, Bradley P. Thirsty for God: A Brief History of Christian Spirituality. Minneapolis: Fortress Press. 2005.
- Letham, Robert. The Work of Christ. Downers Grove: InterVarsity Press. 1993.
- Macleod, Donald. The Person of Christ. Downers Grove: InterVarsity Press. 1998.
- McGrath, Alister. Historical Theology: An Introduction to the History of Christian Thought. Oxford: Blackwell Publishing. 1998.
- Macquarrie, J. Jesus Christ in Modern Thought. London: SCM Press. 1990.
- Neusner, Jacob. From Politics to Piety: The Emergence of Pharisaic Judaism. Providence, R.I.: Brown University. 1973.
- Norris, Richard A. Jr. The Christological Controversy. Philadelphia: Fortress Press. 1980.
- O'Collins, Gerald. Christology: A Biblical, Historical, and Systematic Study of Jesus. Oxford:Oxford University Press. 2009.
- O'Collins, Gerald. Jesus: A Portrait. London: Darton, Longman & Todd. 2008.
- O'Collins, Gerald. Salvation for All: God's Other Peoples. Oxford:Oxford University Press. 2008.
- Pelikan, Jaroslav. Development of Christian Doctrine: Some Historical Prolegomena. London: Yale University Press. 1969.
- Pelikan, Jaroslav. The Emergence of the Catholic Tradition (100–600). Chicago: University of Chicago Press. 1971.
- Rahner, Karl. Foundations of Christian Faith, trans. W.V. Dych. London: Darton, Longman & Todd. 1978.
- Tyson, John R. Invitation to Christian Spirituality: An Ecumenical Anthology. New York: Oxford University Press. 1999.
