= Maev O'Collins =

Australian academic (1929–2021)

Maev O'Collins MBE
- Born: June 1929; Victoria (Australia), Australia
- Died: 3 July 2021 (aged 92); Canberra, Australia
- Education: Melbourne University; Columbia University
- Occupations: Social worker, academic
- Known for: Emeritus professor at University of Papua New Guinea

Ellen Maev O'Collins MBE (June 1929 – 3 July 2021) was an Australian social worker by training, who became Emeritus Professor in the Department of Anthropology and Sociology at the University of Papua New Guinea.

== Early life ==
Ellen Maev O'Collins was born in June 1929 into a family of observant Catholics that included her brother, the priest and academic Gerald O'Collins, and Bishop James O'Collins. Her maternal grandfather was Patrick McMahon Glynn, who had been a government minister. She was sent to boarding schools in Melbourne and then studied at the University of Melbourne, before completing her social work studies at Sydney University. Her first employment, in 1952, was with the Melbourne Catholic Social Services Bureau (Catholic Family Welfare Bureau).

After undergraduate studies in Australia, O'Collins completed a Master's degree and a Doctorate in Social Welfare at Columbia University, New York City. In November 1970, she was in New York and was introduced by a Papua New Guinean attached to the Australian Embassy (Papua New Guinea did not achieve independence until 1975) to Michael Somare who became the country's first prime minister. Over dinner, Somare said to her "You are a long way from home. When you finish your studies, come and work for us at the new university in Port Moresby. Then if you get sick of us or we get sick of you, it's not far to go home." She would remain in close contact with Somare until his death in 2021.

== Career ==
After obtaining her PhD, O'Collins applied for a job at the University of Papua New Guinea (UPNG) in Port Moresby, and took up a lecturer position in the Department of Anthropology and Sociology in 1972. Her role was to establish a social work programme that would reflect the needs of local people. She established new social work and welfare programmes that prepared graduates to work with complex social issues, often in very remote locations. At the time, most personnel working in social welfare sector were expatriates, who had little relevant experience of PNG. After a year in the country, she decided to only take the local salary and forgo the overseas allowance paid to Australians, which effectively doubled their salaries. She did this because she had no dependents and because she thought it would make her more comfortable with the PNG people. Many of her students went on to hold leading positions in the PNG government, including a future prime minister Paias Wingti.

In 1989, O'Collins was appointed emeritus professor of UPNG. In the same year, she left PNG and returned to Australia, moving to Canberra. In Canberra, she continued to be involved in consultancies in Papua New Guinea and other countries in the South Pacific. She provided advice to or hosted many students from Oceania who visited Canberra. From 1990, she held an honorary visiting fellow position with the Australian National University (ANU). In 1996 she was asked to help establish the School of Social Work at the Australian Catholic University (ACU), and from 2000 she was an adjunct professor at ACU. In 2002 she published research on the Australian relationship with Norfolk island and continued to maintain contact with Norfolk Island after that.

Also after returning to Australia, O'Collins began to lecture to the University of the Third Age, Rotary Clubs, and other voluntary organizations, as well as to government departments. She provided background briefings to the Australian Federal Police participating in the 2003 Regional Assistance Mission to Solomon Islands. She had considerable interest in the roles played by Australian universities in the Asia/Pacific region and promoted collaborative research. She was also closely involved in encouraging universities to jointly address intolerance within Australia against Indigenous Australians as well as people from Asia and the Pacific. In 2015 she provided funds for a foundation to provide scholarships to Indigenous Australians and Torres Straits islanders who often experienced financial difficulties while studying social work at ACU in Canberra.

== Publications ==
O'Collins main publications were:

- 2013. Last of the lands we knew: Recollections of the Life and Times of Maev O'Collins. (As told to her nephew Les Coleman). 232pp. Connor Court Publishing, Ballarat, Victoria.
- 2003. Insider/outsider perspectives on local-level aid to Bougainville and Papua New Guinea: Dilemmas for communities. NGOs and donors, Development Bulletin No.61 May 2003:73-78. (with Ruth Saovana-Spriggs), Development Studies Network, ANU.
- 2002. An Uneasy Relationship: Norfolk Island and the Commonwealth of Australia, Pandanus Books, ANU.
- 2000. Images of violence in Papua New Guinea: whose images? Whose reality? in Reflections on Violence in Melanesia, S. Dinnen and A. Ley (eds.), Hawkins Press, Leichhardt and Asia Pacific Press, ANU.
- 2000. Reflections on poverty assessments in Papua New Guinea, Fiji and Vanuatu in Pacific Economic Bulletin, 14(1):33-46.
- 1993. Women and Youth: Groups with special needs. Experiences from Papua New Guinea. Development and Planning in Small Island Nations of the Pacific, United Nations Centre for Regional Development, Nagoya, pp. 153–171.
- 1993. Social Development in Papua New Guinea: 1972-1990, Monograph 18, Department of Political and Social Change, ANU.
- 1992. Logging in Solomon Islands: Economic necessity as the overriding issue?, in Resources and Development in the Pacific Islands, S. Henningham and R.J. May (eds). Crawford House Press.
- 1990. Social and cultural impact: a changing Pacific? and Carteret islanders at the Atolls Resettlement Scheme: a response to land loss and population growth, in Implications of expected climate changes in the South Pacific Region: an overview, J. C. Pernetta and P. J. Hughes (eds). Regional Seas Reports and Studies No. 128. Nairobi: United Nations Environment Programme. 1990.

== Awards and honours ==
- O'Collins was appointed a Member of the Order of the British Empire (MBE) in the 1987 Birthday Honours for "services to the community and education" in Papua New Guinea.
- She was made an emeritus professor of the University of Papua New Guinea in 1989.
- In 2019, the Australian Catholic University awarded her an honorary doctorate for her extensive services to social work throughout her career.
- She was appointed a Life Member of the Australian Association of Social Workers in 2018.

== Death ==
Maev O'Collins died on 3 July 2021.
