= Paul King Jewett =

American theologian, minister, and academic (1919-1991)

- Born: October 6, 1919; Johnson City, New York, U.S.
- Died: September 10, 1991 (aged 71); Pasadena, California, U.S.
- Education: Wheaton College (B.A., Philosophy, 1941); Westminster Theological Seminary (Th.B., Th.M., 1945); Harvard University (Th.D., 1951)
- Occupation: Theologian · Author · Biblical scholar · Educator
- Years active: 1950–1991
- Organizations: Fuller Theological Seminary
- Known for: Professor of Systematic Theology at Fuller Theological Seminary (1955–1991); advocate for evangelical egalitarianism and believer’s baptism
- Notable work: Man as Male and Female (1975); The Lord’s Day (1971); Infant Baptism and the Covenant of Grace (1978); The Ordination of Women (1980); God, Creation, and Revelation (1991)
- Spouse: Christine Jewett (m. 1945–1991)
- Children: Two

Paul King Jewett (October 6, 1919 – September 10, 1991) was an American Christian theologian, author and prominent advocate of the ordination of women and of believer's baptism. He taught systematic theology at Fuller Theological Seminary in Pasadena, California. He is credited with helping develop Fuller into one of the largest seminaries in the country.

== Early life and education ==
Jewett was born on October 6, 1919 in Johnson City, New York, the older of two children. His father was a carpenter and his mother was a homemaker. His family attended a Regular Baptist church.

Jewett studied at Wheaton College and received his B.A. in 1941, studying with Gordon H. Clark and majoring in philosophy. He then attended Westminster Theological Seminary and graduated in 1945 with Th.B. and Th.M. degrees. He obtained a doctorate in theology from Harvard in 1951, with much of his dissertation research done in Switzerland at the University of Berne, the University of Zurich, and the University of Basel.

== Career ==
Jewett taught at Gordon Divinity School from 1950 until 1955. He was a professor of systematic theology at Fuller Theological Seminary in Pasadena from 1955 until his death in 1991.

Early in his career, Jewett was ordained as a minister in the American Baptist Church. However, in 1970 he transferred his ordination credentials to the Presbyterian Church, U.S.A. While he continued to believe in Believer's Baptism until the end of his life, he stated that he felt more at home with the Reformed theology of the Presbyterian Church.

== Theology ==
Jewett is credited with being one of the major instigators of the contemporary Christian egalitarian movement in the evangelical church. In 1975 his book Man as Male and Female was published. This work reconsiders the biblical evidence for the role of men and women and argues that Paul was speaking as inspired by God when he argued for the equality of women, but with a Jewish rabbinic mindset when speaking of women as subordinate to man. Jewett called Galatians 3:28 the "Magna Carta of humanity".

Jewett was a controversial figure in evangelicalism beginning with his book Man as Male and Female which reconsidered traditional theology on the male/female relationship going so far as to suggest Paul was at times chauvinistic and uninspired in some areas of the New Testament epistles. His last work, co-authored with Marguerite Shuster was meant to be part of a larger systematic theology he was writing but died before completing. It revealed liberal views on evolution, abortion, capital punishment, and homosexuality.

== Personal life and death ==
Jewett married his wife Christine in 1945, and had two daughters. He died of cancer in Pasadena on September 10, 1991.

== Books ==
- Jewett, Paul King (1954). Emil Brunner's Concept of Revelation. James Clarke – via Internet Archive.
- Jewett, Paul King (1961). Emil Brunner: An Introduction to the Man and His Thought. InterVarsity Press – via Internet Archive.
- Jewett, Paul King (1971). The Lord's Day: A Theological Guide to the Christian Day of Worship. Eerdmans – via Internet Archive.
- Jewett, Paul King (1975). Man as Male and Female: A Study in Sexual Relationships from a Theological Point of View. Eerdmans – via Open Library.
- Jewett, Paul King (1978). Infant Baptism and the Covenant of Grace: An Appraisal of the Argument That As Infants Were Once Circumcised, So They Should Now Be Baptized. Eerdmans – via Open Library.
- Jewett, Paul King (1980). The Ordination of Women: An Essay on the Office of Christian Ministry. Eerdmans – via Open Library.
- Jewett, Paul King (1985). Election and Predestination. Eerdmans – via Internet Archive.
- Jewett, Paul King (1991). God, Creation, and Revelation: A Neo-Evangelical Theology. Eerdmans – via Open Library.
- Jewett, Paul King (1996). Shuster, Marguerite (ed.). Who We Are: Our Dignity as Human: A Neo-Evangelical Theology. Eerdmans – via Open Library.
