= Hermanubis =

Classical-era Greco-Egyptian syncretic God

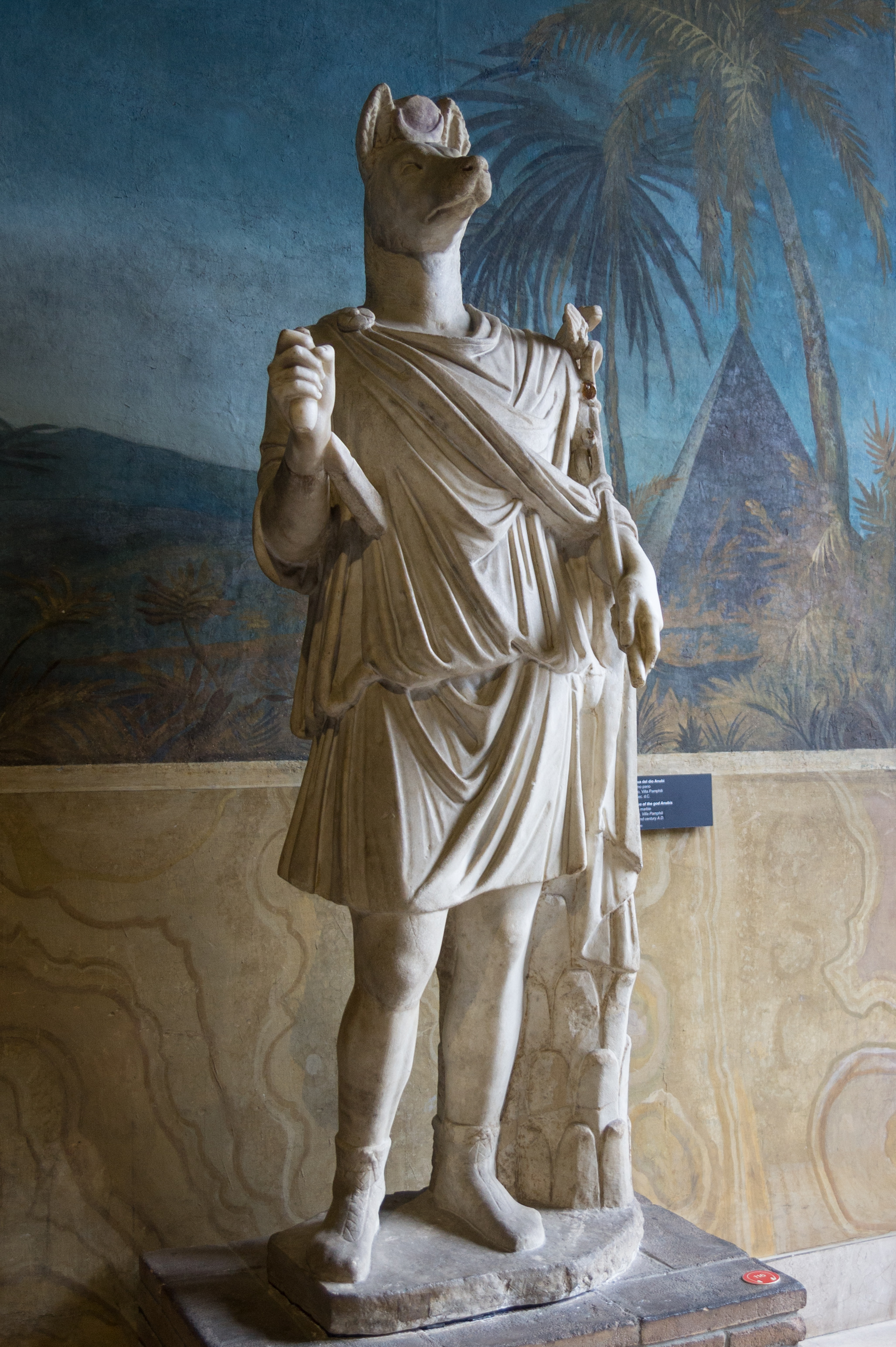
Hermanubis marble statue, 1st–2nd century AD (Vatican Museums)

Hermanubis (Ancient Greek: Ἑρμανοῦβις, romanized: Hermanoubis) is a Graeco-Egyptian god who conducts the souls of the dead to the underworld. He is a syncretism of Hermes from Greek mythology and Anubis from Egyptian mythology. Hermanubis was possibly one of the inspirations of the dog-headed Saint Christopher – a cynocephalus saint, who was, similarly to Anubis/Hermanubis, a powerful ferryman for travelers.

== Description ==
Hermes' and Anubis's similar responsibilities (they were both conductors of souls) led to the god Hermanubis. He was popular during the period of Roman domination over Egypt. Depicted having a human body and a jackal head, with the sacred caduceus that belonged to the Greek god Hermes, he represented the Egyptian priesthood. He engaged in the investigation of truth.

The divine name Ἑρμανοῦβις (Hermanoubis) is known from a handful of epigraphic and literary sources, mostly of the Roman period. Plutarch cites the name as a designation of Anubis in his underworldly aspect, while Porphyry refers to Hermanubis as σύνθετος (sýnthetos) "composite" and μιξέλλην (mixéllin) "half-Greek".

Although it was not common in traditional Greek religion to combine the names of two gods in this manner, the double determination of Hermanubis has some formal parallels in the earlier period. The most obvious is the god Hermaphroditus, attested from the fourth century BC onwards, but his name implies the paradoxical union of two different gods (Hermes and Aphrodite) rather than an assimilation in the manner of Hermanubis.

== Gallery ==
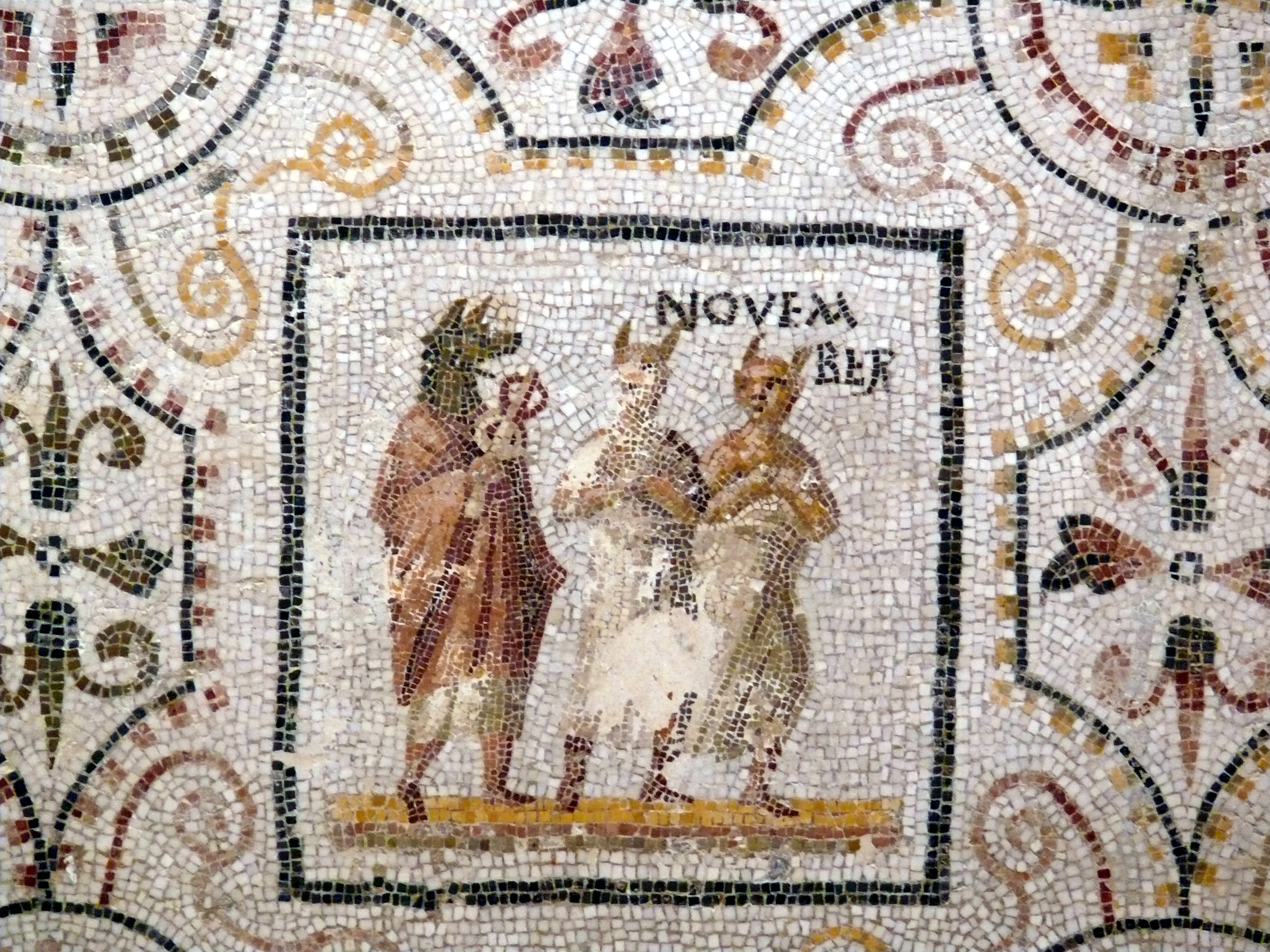
Hermanubis in the November panel of a Roman mosaic calendar from Sousse, Tunisia

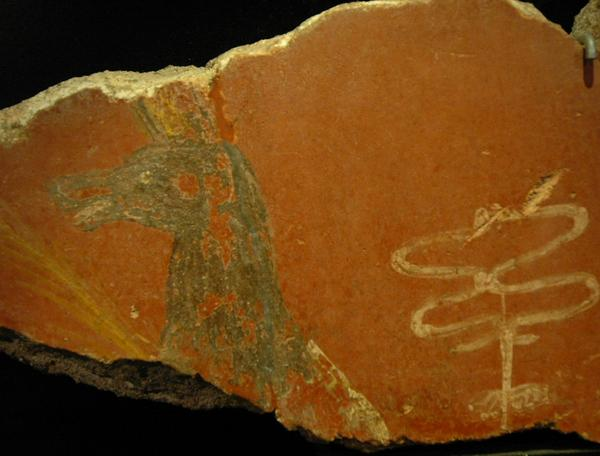
Hermanubis, depicted on a wall painting in an Isis Sanctuary, Mainz

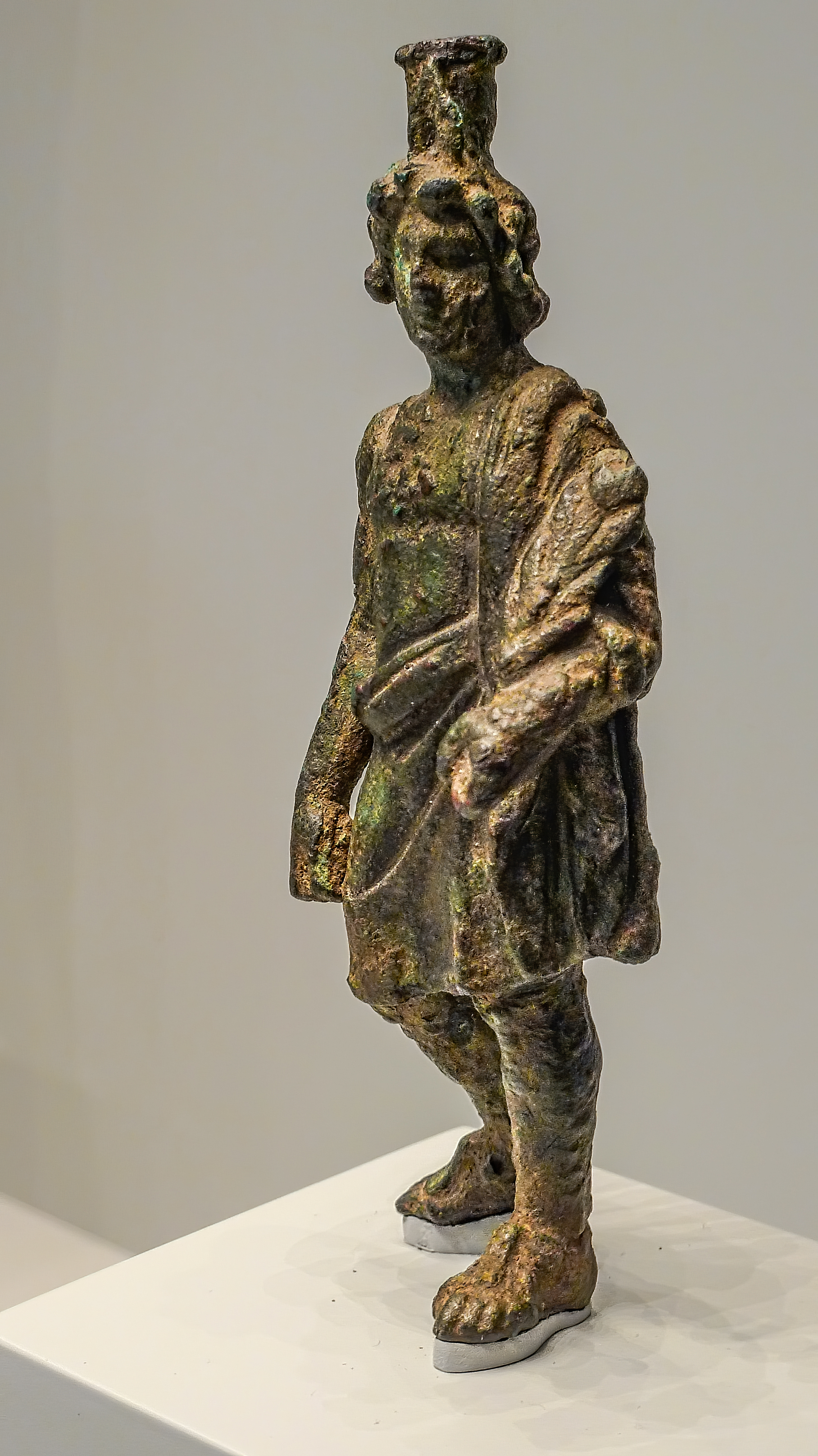
A 2nd-century AD statuette identified as Hermanubis

== See also ==
- Ancient Egyptian religion
- Ancient Greek religion
- Egyptian pantheon
- Osiris-Dionysus
- Serapis

== Bibliography ==
- Bricault, Laurent, "A Statuette of Hermanubis in the J. Paul Getty Museum", in Getty Research Journal, Vol. 10, pp. 225–231, 2018. doi:10.1086/697392.
- A history of Egypt Under Roman Rule by Joseph Grafton Milne (1992) p. 195
- Who's Who in Egyptian Mythology by Anthony S. Mercatante (2002) p. 56
