= Dionysus-Osiris =

Syncretism of the Egyptian god Osiris and the Greek god Dionysus

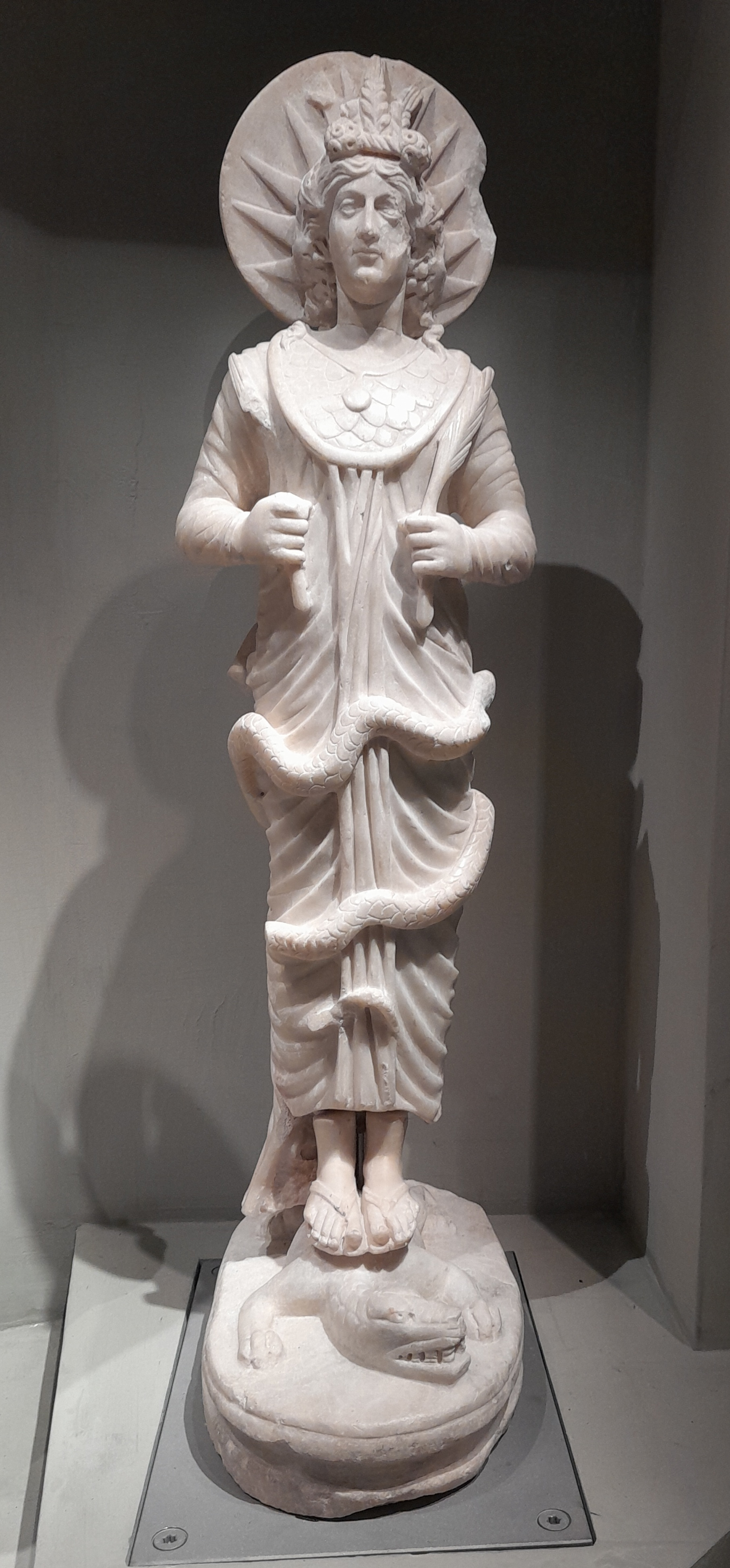
A statuette depicting Osiris-Dionysus as lord of time, late 2nd-century AD, Acropolis Museum Greece.

Dionysus-Osiris, alternatively Osiris-Dionysus, is a deity arising from the syncretism of the Egyptian god Osiris and the Greek god Dionysus.

== Syncretism ==
The two deities had been identified with each other as early as the 5th century BC, as recounted in the Histories of Herodotus:

For no gods are worshipped by all Egyptians in common except Isis and Osiris, who they say is Dionysus; these are worshipped by all alike. [...] Osiris is, in the Greek language, Dionysus.

Other syncretic deities arose from these Egyptian-Greek conflations, including Serapis and Hermanubis.

Dionysus-Osiris was particularly popular in Ptolemaic Egypt, as the Ptolemies claimed descent from Dionysus, and as pharaohs claimed the lineage of Osiris. This association was most notable during a deification ceremony where Mark Antony became Dionysus-Osiris, alongside Cleopatra as Isis-Aphrodite.

In the controversial book The Jesus Mysteries, Osiris-Dionysus is claimed to be the basis of Jesus as a syncretic dying-and-rising god, with early Christianity beginning as a Greco-Roman mystery. The book and its "Jesus Mysteries thesis" have not been accepted by mainstream scholarship, with Bart Ehrman stating that the work is unscholarly.

== See also ==
- Dionysus in comparative mythology
- Mysteries of Osiris
