= George E. Mendenhall =

American Lutheran Old Testament scholar

George Emery Mendenhall
- Born: August 13, 1916; Muscatine, Iowa, U.S.
- Died: August 5, 2016 (aged 99); Ann Arbor, Michigan, U.S.
- Education: Midland College (B.A., 1936); Western Theological Seminary; Lutheran Theological Seminary at Gettysburg (B.D., 1938); Johns Hopkins University (Ph.D., 1947)
- Occupations: Biblical scholar Ordained Lutheran minister University professor
- Employer: University of Michigan
- Notable work: Law and Covenant in Israel and the Ancient Near East; The Tenth Generation: The Origins of the Biblical Tradition; Ancient Israel’s Faith and History: An Introduction the Bible in Context; Our Misunderstood Bible
- Parents: George Newton (father); Mary Johnson Mendenhall (mother)

George Emery Mendenhall (August 13, 1916 – August 5, 2016) was an American Biblical scholar who taught at the University of Michigan's Department of Near Eastern Studies.

== Career ==
Mendenhall graduated from Midland College in Nebraska in 1936, and from Lutheran Theological Seminary at Gettysburg in 1938. Mendenhall was first an ordained Lutheran minister, and during World War II he served as an intelligence officer in the United States Navy. After the war, Mendenhall obtained a Ph.D. in Semitic languages from Johns Hopkins University and began a career in Ancient Near Eastern and Biblical studies as well as related archeology. He was professor at the University of Michigan from 1952 to 1986. The University of Michigan honored Mendenhall by creating the "George E. Mendenhall Professor Emeritus of Ancient and Biblical Studies".

The Tenth Generation proposed that the Ancient Israelite settlement was actually the result of a cultural-religious egalitarian revolution within Canaanite society, rejecting the views it was either a military conquest or a process of peaceful sedentism. It was popular with some New Left scholars in the mid-1970s. Mendenhall died in August 2016, just 8 days short of his 100th birthday.

== Partial bibliography ==
- Law and Covenant in Israel and the Ancient Near East Pittsburgh: The Biblical Colloquium, 1955.
- The Tenth Generation: The Origins of the Biblical Tradition Johns Hopkins, 1973.
- Ancient Israel’s Faith and History: An Introduction to the Bible in Context (Edited by Gary A. Herion) Westminster John Knox Press, 2001.
- Our Misunderstood Bible BookSurge Publishing, 2006
- The Quest for the Kingdom of God: Studies in Honor of George E. Mendenhall Eisenbrauns, 1983.
