= Jacques Dupuis (Jesuit) =

Jesuit priest and theologian

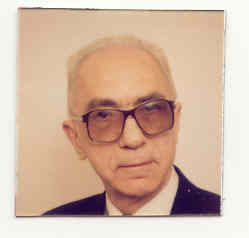
- Jacques Dupuis
- Born: 5 December 1923; Huppaye, Brabant, Belgium
- Died: 28 December 2004 (aged 81); Rome
- Church: Roman Catholic
- Ordained: 1954

Jacques Dupuis (5 December 1923 – 28 December 2004) was a Belgian Jesuit priest and theologian. He spent several decades in India and taught at the Pontifical Gregorian University in Rome.

== Career ==
Jacques Dupuis became a Jesuit in 1941. After early religious and academic training in Belgium, he left for India in 1948. A three-year (1948–1951) teaching experience at St. Xavier's Collegiate School, Calcutta, made him discover the way Hinduism shaped the personalities of the students entrusted to him. This discovery about the variety of religions was the beginning of a lifelong search: "does God's self-revelation necessarily pass for all through the person of Jesus Christ?"

After being ordained priest in Kurseong, India he completed a doctorate at the Gregorian University in Rome on the religious anthropology of Origen of Alexandria. He was assigned to teach Dogmatic Theology at the Jesuit Faculty of Theology of Kurseong (later shifted to Delhi, and renamed 'Vidyajyoti College of Theology').

Director of the journal Vidyajyoti Journal of Theological Reflection, Father Dupuis was also an adviser to the Catholic Bishops' conference of India. Besides numerous articles on theological and inter-religious topics, he published in 1973 (with Josef Neuner) a collection of church documents, The Christian Faith, that went into seven editions over twenty years. Some considered it an invaluable instrument of theological learning for students of Catholicism.

In 1984, after 36 years in India, Dupuis was called to teach theology and non-Christian religions at the Gregorian University in Rome. His book Jésus-Christ à la rencontre des religions (1989) was well-received and promptly translated in Italian, English and Spanish. He was made director of the journal Gregorianum and appointed consultor at the Pontifical Council for Interreligious Dialogue.

== Under investigation ==
In 2001, the Congregation for the Doctrine of the Faith, a department of the Roman Curia, determined that his book Toward a Christian Theology of Religious Pluralism contained ambiguities that present "difficulties on important doctrinal points" with respect to the proper understanding of "the seeds of truth and goodness that exist in other religions." Even a positive reviewer, Gavin D'Costa, noted that in Depuis's argument, "there is no 'necessity' (Lumen Gentium 14) of the Church as the mediator of salvation."

Dupuis was told to clarify his position in relation to that document, but he was never disciplined. Future editions of his book had to include a copy of the Congregation's notification about areas in which it considered his work unclear. A visitor reported in 2003 that "the ordeal he went through with the C.D.F. had caused havoc to his mental and physical health." The notification stated: "It is consistent with Catholic doctrine to hold that the seeds of truth and goodness that exist in other religions are a certain participation in truths contained in the revelation of or in Jesus Christ. However, it is erroneous to hold that such elements of truth and goodness, or some of them, do not derive ultimately from the source-mediation of Jesus Christ."

Subsequently, however, Dupuis's 'pioneering' work was highly praised on the meaning of other religions in "God's plan of salvation of mankind."

== Christology ==
Many theologians argue for a Christology that is expressly based on the Trinity and an understanding of the interpersonal relationships between Father and Son and between Son and Holy Spirit. In Jacques Dupuis' Who Do You Say I Am?, he argues that, within the one person of Jesus Christ, we can distinguish between his two natures, human and divine, and thus between the operations of his uncreated divine nature and his created finite human nature.

In order to properly phrase the relationship between Jesus Christ and the Father, Dupuis utilizes different terms to describe aspects of Christ's divine and human nature. Instead of "absolute" and "definitive", Dupuis speaks in terms of "constitutive" and "universal". In this way, Dupuis tries to lead the discussion away from dealing in absolutes.

First, our knowledge of God is not absolute or definitive; it is necessarily limited. Second, the absolute Savior is the Father, who is the ultimate source of the risen Lord and of all reality. Hence, the uniqueness and universality of Christ the Savior are 'constitutive.' As the son of God incarnate, Jesus is the center of history and the key to the entire procession of salvation, and his resurrection confers universal significance on his human existence. In this sense, he is 'constitutive' of universal salvation.

Dupuis emphasizes that Jesus' constitutive uniqueness as universal Savior rests on his personal identity as the Son of God.

== See also ==
- Religious pluralism
- Religious exclusivism
- Extra Ecclesiam nulla salus

== Bibliography ==
- The Christian Faith, Alba House New York (1973) ISBN 0-8189-0453-4.
- Jesus-Christ at the encounter of World Religions (1991).
- Who do you say I am ? Introduction to Christology (1994).
- Towards a Christian Theology of Religious Pluralism (1997).
- Christianity and the religions (2002).
- Kendall, Daniel (2003). O'Collins, Gerald (eds), In many and diverse ways: In Honor of Jacques Dupuis (2003). Includes a complete bibliography of Depuis's work.
- Burrows, William (2013). Jacques Dupuis Faces the Inquisition. Eugene, Oregon: Pickwick Publications. ISBN 978-1-62032-335-9.
- Gerard O'Connell, Do not stifle the Spirit; Conversations with Jacques Dupuis, New York (Maryknoll), Orbis Books, 2017.
