= Marguerite Shuster =

American theologian and academic (1947–2026)

Marguerite L. Shuster (September 10, 1947 – April 29, 2026) was an American academic who was Harold John Ockenga Professor Emeritus of Preaching and Theology at Fuller Theological Seminary. She was an ordained minister in the Presbyterian Church (USA).

== Life and career ==
Born on September 10, 1947, Shuster received her B.A. from Stanford University, majoring in psychology, and her M.Div. and Ph.D. from Fuller Theological Seminary. Before joining the faculty of Fuller Seminary she was a Presbyterian pastor for over ten years. She published many scholarly articles and books, as well as editing and completing Paul King Jewett's Who We Are: Our Dignity as Human published in 1996. Shuster died on April 29, 2026, at the age of 78.

== Bibliography ==
Power, Pathology, Paradox: The Dynamics of Evil and Good. Grand Rapids: Zondervan, 1987.

Perspectives on Christology: Essays in Honor of Paul K. Jewett. Grand Rapids: Zondervan, 1991. (Editor, with Richard Muller).

Who We Are: Our Dignity as Human. Grand Rapids: Eerdmans, 1996. (Editor and collaborator with Paul King Jewett).

The Fall and Sin: What We Have Become as Sinners. Grand Rapids: Eerdmans, 2004.
