= Jesus: A Portrait =

2008 book by Gerald O'Collins

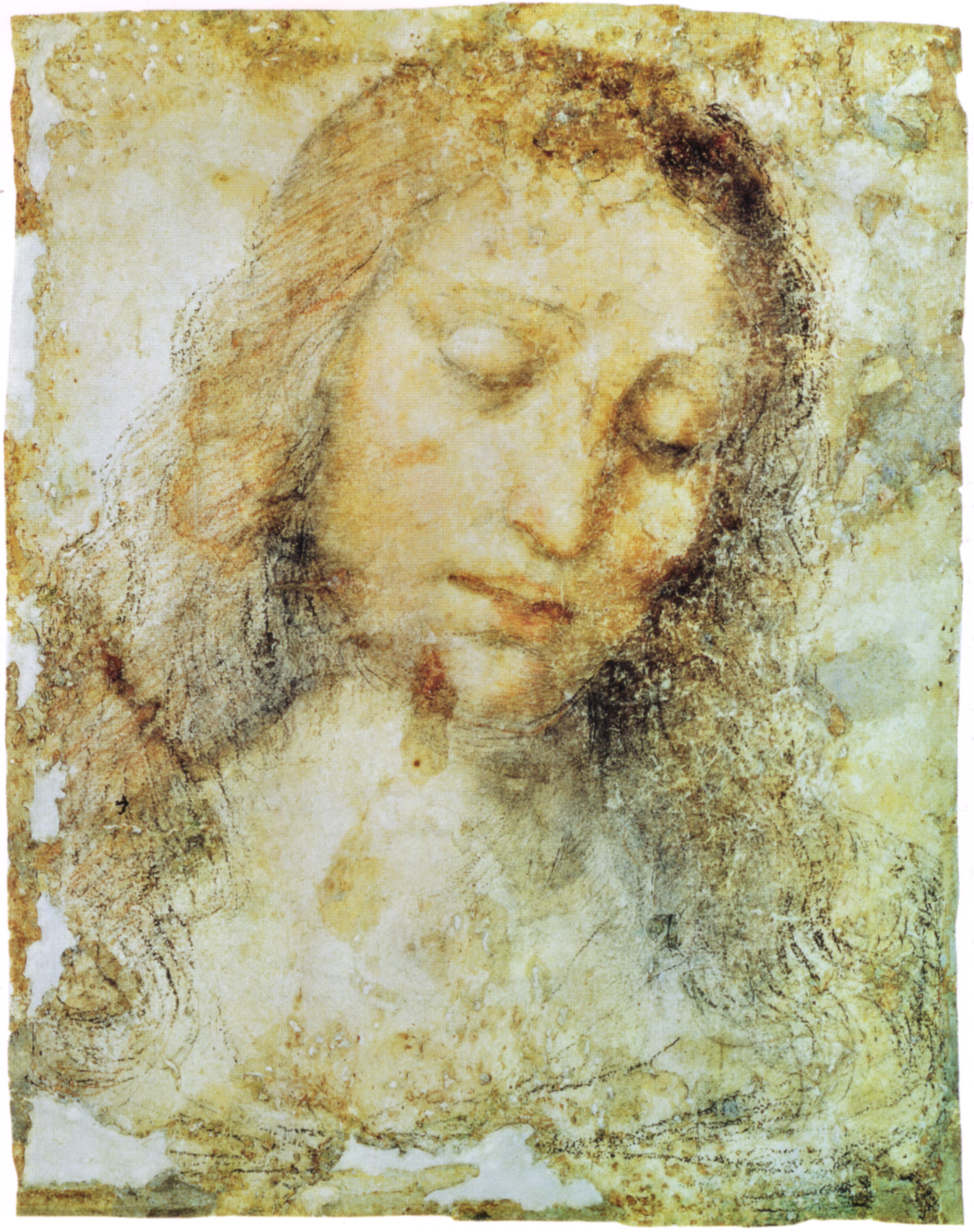
- Leonardo da Vinci, Head of Christ (study for the Last Supper)
- Author: Gerald O'Collins, SJ
- Language: English
- Subject: Christology
- Genre: Theology, Biography
- Publisher: Darton, Longman and Todd Ltd
- Publication date: 24 March 2008
- Publication place: United Kingdom
- Media type: Paperback, E-Book at Google Books
- ISBN: 978-0232527193
- Dewey Decimal: 232.9/01
- LC Class: 2007-044172
- Preceded by: Salvation for All. God's Other Peoples
- Followed by: Christology: A Biblical, Historical, and Systematic Study of Jesus

Jesus: A Portrait is a 2008 Christological book by the Australian Jesuit priest and academic Gerald O'Collins.

== Synopsis ==
The testimony embodied in the Gospels and coming from eyewitnesses provides the substance for O'Collins' book. The author states that to portray Jesus adequately is an impossible dream (John 20:30;21:25). Unlike his near contemporary Marcus Tullius Cicero (106-43 BC/BCE), he left no letters or other personal documents. The only time he was remembered as writing anything, came when he 'wrote with his finger on the ground' (John 8:6–8). This was in response to some scribes and Pharisees who had caught a woman in adultery and wanted Jesus to agree to her being stoned. According to several later manuscripts, Jesus wrote on the ground nothing about himself but 'the sins of each of them'. Jesus did not bequeath to his followers any written instructions, and he lived in almost total obscurity, except for the brief period of his public ministry. According to the testimony provided by the Synoptic Gospels, that ministry could have lasted as little as a year or eighteen months. John implies a period of two or three years. Even for the brief span of that ministry, much of the chronological sequence of events (except for the baptism of Jesus at the start and his passion at the end) is, by and large, irretrievably lost. The author therefore states that the fact that, explicitly and for the most part, Jesus did not proclaim himself but the kingdom of God, as well as the fact that he left no personal papers, makes access to his interior life difficult. In any case the Gospels rarely mention his motives or deal with his states of mind. These sources make it hard (but not impossible) to penetrate his inner life. But they do allow one to reconstruct much of the message, activity, claims, and impact of Jesus in the final years of his life, as well as glimpsing every now and then his feelings and intentions. This O'Collins does right through the book, with fluency and appropriate substantiation.

Jesus himself never wrote, O'Collins affirms, but he continues to speak through the writings of the evangelists. In drawing on the Gospels, O'Collins uses the widely accepted scheme of three stages in the transmission of testimony to Jesus' deeds and words: (1) the initial stage in his earthly life when his disciples and others spoke about him, repeated to others his teaching, and began interpreting his identity and mission; (2) the handing on by word of mouth or in writing of testimony about him after his death and resurrection; and (3) the authorial work of the four evangelists later in the first century.

== Excerpt ==
Getting to know any person and, in particular, someone of world stature and significance is always much more than a mere problem to be solved; it is a mystery to be wondered at and grappled with. It is at our peril that we approach our knowledge of Jesus as a problem to be solved by honesty and scholarship rather than as a mystery (or rather the mystery) with which to engage ourselves for a lifetime. We are all part of the history of Jesus and his mystery - whether we realise this or not. This necessary involvement of ourselves in his full and unfolding story rules out attempts to tackle the history of Jesus as if it were no more than a mere problem 'out there' or 'back there', standing quite apart from our personal existence. Really knowing another person in depth - and, especially, Jesus - always demands that we relate to and participate in another personal mystery.

— Gerald O'Collins, Jesus: A Portrait, p. xv

== Contents ==
Preface

1. The Beauty of Jesus
2. God's Kingdom in Person
3. Divine and Human
4. Jesus the Healer
5. The Meanings of the Miracles
6. Jesus the Story-teller
7. The Parable of the Father's Love
8. Jesus the Teacher
9. Facing Death
10. Jesus the Suffering Servant
11. Jesus the Lord of Glory
12. Jesus the Abiding Presence

Epilogue - Notes - Select Bibliography - Index of names

== See also ==
- Jesus Christ
- Christology
- Christian Theology
- Views on Jesus
  - Jesuism
  - Jews for Jesus
  - Redeemer (Christianity)
  - Lost years of Jesus
- Related lists
  - List of books about Jesus
  - List of founders of religious traditions
  - List of people claimed to be Jesus
  - List of people who have been considered deities
