= Donovan Joyce =

Australian writer (1910–1980)

Donovan Joyce

Donovan Maxwell Joyce (31 October 1910 – 16 October 1980) was an Australian radio producer and writer, best known as the author of the international best-seller The Jesus Scroll.

== Life ==
Joyce was born in 1910 in Hawthorn, Melbourne, and educated at Scotch College. On leaving education he was employed by BHP but, finding himself unsuited to that work, he performed in amateur theatricals in Melbourne and was stage manager for several productions of the Little Theatre Company.

In 1932 Joyce entered commercial radio, working in various stations across Australia, and eventually rising to station manager. He could not enlist during World War II because of a childhood injury, so instead he served as an air-raid warden. At this time he wrote a regular and occasionally controversial column in Radio Times under the pseudonym 'Slapper'.

He formed Donovan Joyce Productions in 1945. For his new company he wrote and commissioned dramas and documentaries for radio, many of which he exported, particularly to South Africa, where he also advised on local radio production. Although Joyce wrote the script for a television episode of Homicide in 1966, he never adapted to writing for the small screen.

Joyce traveled to Israel in 1964 to visit Masada in order to write a book about it. Joyce claimed that he was prevented by Yigael Yadin from visiting the archaeological digs at Masada. In his book The Jesus Scroll, Joyce claimed he met someone who had discovered a scroll at Masada. The scroll was allegedly written on 15 April 73 AD and signed by "Yeshua Ben Ya'akob Ben Gennesareth, the last rightful inheritor of the Hasmonean (Maccabean) Kings of Israel" – this is interpreted as Jesus of Gennesareth in this book.

After a brief return to radio in Australia, he published The Jesus Scroll (Sydney, 1972; London, 1973), an original account of the life of Christ that became a best-seller and led to controversy and death threats.

Joyce died of hypertensive heart disease on 16 October 1980, aged 69, at Prahran in Melbourne and was cremated. He was survived by his wife and a son.

== Radiography ==
Below are a list of radio shows produced by Donovan Joyce Productions or penned by Donovan Joyce.

- A Matter of Luck
- Adam and Eve
- Amazing Duchess
- Case of the Purple Cow, The
- Convict Girl
- Departure Delayed
- Devil's Duchess, The
- Devil's Holiday
- Empty Arms
- File of Queer Stories
- Forty Glorious Years
- Gabrielle
- Image of Dorinda
- Knave of Hearts
- Legend of Kathy Warren, The
- Lilian Dale Affair
- Mad Monk Man
- Man Hunt
- Office Wife
- Passing Parade
- Popular Fallacies
- Scarlet Harvest
- Search for Karen Hastings, The
- Sparrows of London
- Stepmother
- Strange House of Jeffrey Marlowe, The
- Stranger in Paradise
- T-Men (The first Donovan Joyce Radio Production ever submitted to the United States, was sold to US networks and independent stations within a week of its arrival.)
- This Man is Mine
- Two Roads to Samarra
- Walk a Crooked Mile
- Woman in the Mirror
