= Christology: A Biblical, Historical, and Systematic Study of Jesus =

Book by Gerald O'Collins

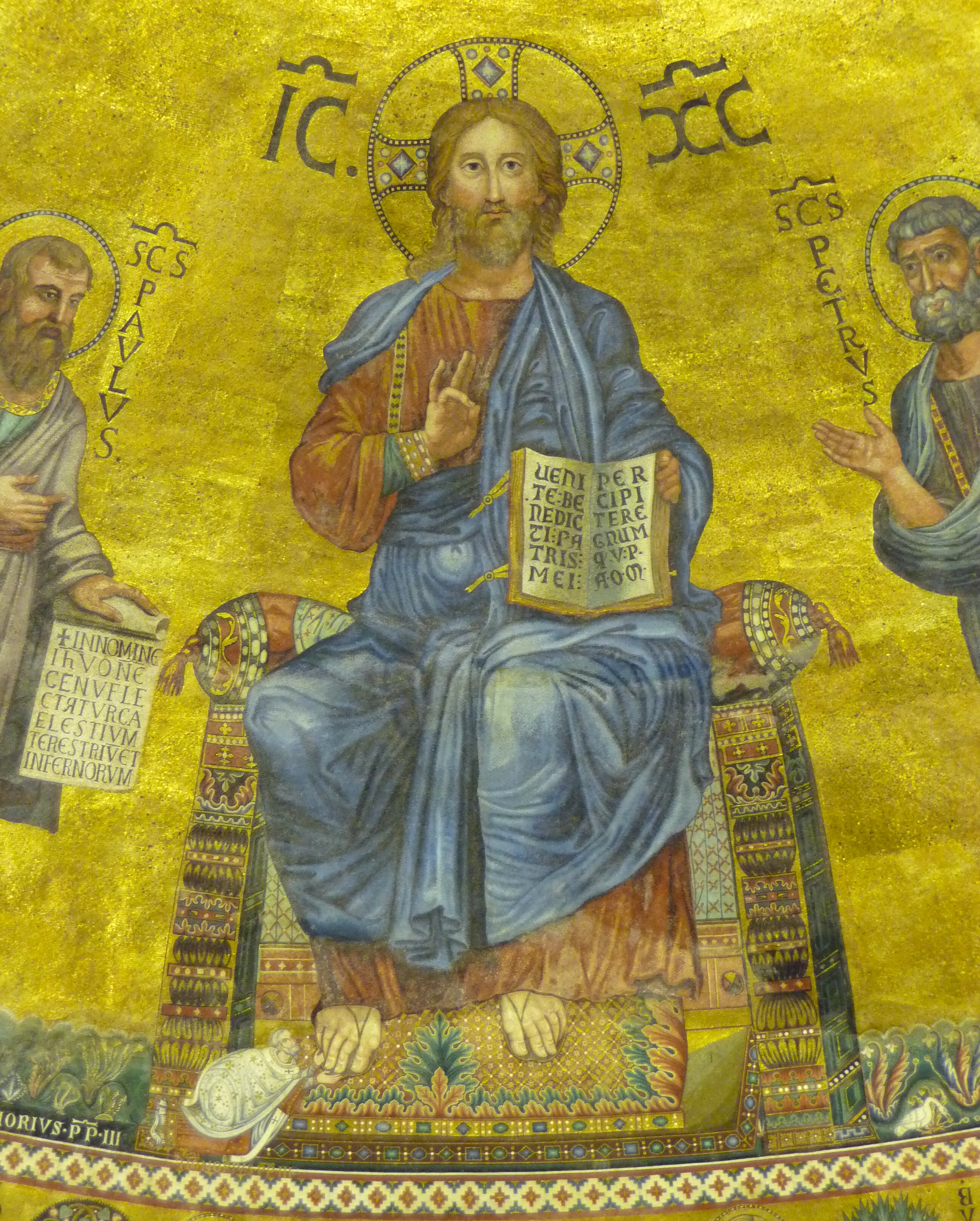
- Author: Gerald O'Collins
- Language: English
- Subject: Christology
- Genre: Theology
- Publisher: Oxford University Press
- Publication date: 9 July 2009 (2nd revised ed.)
- Publication place: United Kingdom
- Media type: Paperback, E-Book at Google Books
- ISBN: 978-0199557875
- Dewey Decimal: 232
- LC Class: 2009-926738
- Preceded by: Jesus: A Portrait
- Followed by: Rethinking Fundamental Theology

Christology: A Biblical, Historical, and Systematic Study of Jesus is a 2009 theological book by the Australian Jesuit priest and academic Gerald O'Collins. This work was originally published in 1995 with the title Christology: A Biblical, Historical, and Systematic Study of Jesus Christ, but the author thoroughly revised the whole text in 2009 to take account of the numerous biblical, historical, and systematic studies of Jesus that appeared following its first edition.

== Synopsis ==
In this revised and updated second edition of his account of systematic Christology, O'Collins critically examines the more authoritative biblical and historical scholarship before confronting some key questions about orthodox faith and free will as applicable to Jesus in his person, being, and activity. In seeking to clarify the essential truths about him, the book investigates who Jesus was/is and what he did/does.

O'Collins attempts to answer some difficult questions: Was Jesus both human and divine? If so, how is that possible and not a blatant contradiction in terms? "Surely - he writes - we cannot attribute to one and the same subject the attributes of being simultaneously finite (as a human being) and infinite (as Son of God)?" The author proposes that one should envisage Jesus' revealing and redeeming 'work' as having an impact not only on all men and women of all times and places, but also on the whole created cosmos. Recognising the difficulty in describing or even minimally explaining Christ's salvific 'work', the book is built around the resurrection of the crucified Jesus, highlights love as the key to redemption, and proposes a synthesis of the divine presence through Jesus.

The second edition includes fresh material on current discussions in the study of Christology: the use of 'near-death' and bereavement experiences as analogies to the post-resurrection appearances of Christ; contemporary philosophical theology and the case for the theological coherence of the Incarnation; the universal redemptive activity of Christ; and the place and possibilities of 'presence' as an organising category in Christology.

Furthermore, the author covers specific theological approaches including Martin Luther's theology of the cross and liberation theology.

== Contents ==
Chapter 1 - Some Major Challenges

History
Philosophy
Language
Content, Emphases, and Context

Chapter 2 - The Jewish Matrix

Five Titles
Two Closing Comments

Chapter 3 - The Human History

Some Preliminaries
Proclaimer of the Kingdom
Personal Authority
Son of Man
Self-Identity
Faced with Death
Conclusion

Chapter 4 - The Resurrection

The Claim
First Ground for the Claim: The Appearances
The Appearances Challenged
A Secondary Sign
Other Factors
The Resurrection as Revealing
Resurrection as Redemptive

God's Activity Chapter 5 - The Son of God

Dating the Title
The Title's Meaning
Naming the Son of God

Chapter 6 - Lord, Saviour, God, and Spirit

Lord
Further Appropriations
Saviour and God
Spirit
Trinity

Chapter 7 - To the First Council of Constantinople

Four Queries
Ambiguities and Intimations
Divinity and Humanity

Chapter 8 - Ephesus, Chalcedon, and Beyond

After Chalcedon
Into the Middle Ages

Chapter 9 - Medieval and Modern Christology

Thomas Aquinas
To the Reformation
The Background for Today

Chapter 10 - Divine and Human

Divinity
Humanity
Divine and Human
One Divine Person
Personal Pre-existence
Further Issues

Chapter 11 - Faith, Holiness, and Virginal Conception

The Faith of Jesus
The Sinlessness of Christ
The Grace of Christ
The Virginal Conception

Chapter 12 - Redeemer

The Human Need
Christ's Saving Work
Saved by Love

Chapter 13 - Universal Redeemer

The Redeemer of All
Grounds for a Universal Claim
The Salvation of the Non-evangelized
A Coda

Chapter 14 - The Possibilities of Presence

Chapters 2-13 on Christ's Presence
A Philosophy of Presence
The Revealing and Saving Presence of Christ
Three Further Advantages
Conclusion

Bibliography - Index of Names - Biblical Index

== See also ==
- Christian theology
- Jesuism
- Jews for Jesus
- List of books about Jesus
- List of founders of religious traditions
- List of people claimed to be Jesus
- List of people who have been considered deities
- Redeemer (Christianity)
- Unknown years of Jesus
