= The Life and Death of the Radical Historical Jesus =

2013 book by David Burns

- Author: David Burns
- Language: English
- Genre: Non-fiction
- Publisher: Oxford University Press
- Publication date: 2013

The Life and Death of the Radical Historical Jesus is a 2013 book by David Burns published by Oxford University Press. It is a cultural and intellectual history of Jesus as envisioned by various left-wing radicals in the United States from the mid-nineteenth century to World War I. The book received positive critical reviews.

== Content ==
Among those who were fascinated by the radical Jesus were freethinkers, unionists, socialists, and anarchists, but the concept had little appeal to mainline Protestants, African-Americans, or Catholics. Burns also emphasizes division between Social Gospel and Christian socialists from "radical religionists" who emphasized Jesus as a human, political figure and rejected his divinity, as well as between those who were genuinely inspired by the story of Jesus versus those who appropriated Jesus to support their causes. Among the figures analyzed by the book are abolitionists Ernest Renan and Frederick Douglass, religious dissenters such as Robert Ingersoll and Elizabeth Cady Stanton. In the second chapter socialist conceptions of Jesus by George Herron and Cyrenus Ward are discussed, as well as religious conflict within the Socialist Party. Theologian Bouck White and his influential The Call of the Carpenter, which depicts Jesus as a revolutionary figure campaigning against Roman imperialism and greed, are discussed in two chapters. The last chapter discusses Eugene Debs, who, Burns argues, draws heavily on the radical Jesus tradition. The actors who created the "radical historical Jesus" acknowledged that their representation was imagined even while arguing that it was historically correct.

== Reception ==
Reviewer Janine Drake writes that the book is a "giant step forward for the field of working class intellectual history", and that Burns "deserves the highest praise" for "crafting a deeply compelling and very readable narrative from scattered biographies, published writings, and newspapers". Patricia Appelbaum writes that the book is "a valuable contribution to the literature on American constructions of Jesus" and praises Burns for choosing an understudied topic. Sean McCloud found the book a "solid contribution to American studies, American religious history, and American labor history". According to David Mihalyfy, Burns' "major argument—that an extra-academic radical historical Jesus strode through the United States around the turn of the twentieth century—is important and simply indisputable."
