= The Jesus Scroll =

1972 book by Donovan Joyce

- Paperback edition of 'The Jesus Scroll'.
- Author: Donovan Joyce
- Subject: History of Jesus, family of Jesus
- Publisher: New American Library
- Publication date: 1972
- Publication place: Australia
- Media type: Print
- Pages: 194

The Jesus Scroll is a best-selling book first published in 1972 and written by Australian author Donovan Joyce. A forerunner to some of the ideas later investigated in The Da Vinci Code, Joyce's book made the claim that Jesus of Nazareth may have actually died aged 80 at Masada near the Dead Sea, site of the last stand made by Jewish zealot rebels against the Roman Empire, after the Fall of Jerusalem and the destruction of the Second Temple.

Joyce, an Australian journalist, claimed to have seen a scroll stolen from the Masada excavations. He wrote that it was one of fifteen scrolls discovered during the dig there. His book states that the stolen autobiographical scroll was signed Yeshua ben Ya’akob ben Gennesareth, who described himself as eighty years old and added that he was the last of the rightful kings of Israel. The name when translated into English became Jesus of Gennesareth, son of Jacob. Joyce identifies the author as Jesus of Nazareth. Joyce's book further suggests that Jesus may have survived the crucifixion, was present during the Roman siege of Masada during the Jewish Revolt of 66-74 AD, and that he had married Mary Magdalene and fathered a child with her.

Joyce claimed that he attempted to visit Masada in 1964 during the archaeological excavation but was prevented by Yigael Yadin. Joyce further claimed that an anonymous and corrupt archaeologist, "Dr. Grosset", asked him to help smuggle the 'Jesus Scroll' out of Israel that had been discovered during that dig. Joyce says in his book that the scroll was sneaked aboard an airplane by Dr. Grosset, who then most likely took it to Russia to strike a deal with Soviet leaders. The publication became a best-seller and led to death threats and continuing controversy.
