= The Jesus Mysteries =

1999 book by Freke and Gandy

- The cover of The Jesus Mysteries features a gem of Dionysus/Orpheus.
- Author: Timothy Freke & Peter Gandy
- Language: English
- Publisher: Three Rivers Press
- Publication place: United Kingdom
- Media type: Hardback
- ISBN: 978-0609807989

The Jesus Mysteries: Was the "Original Jesus" a Pagan God? is a 1999 book by British authors Timothy Freke and Peter Gandy, which advances the argument that early Christianity originated as a Greco-Roman mystery cult and that Jesus was invented by early Christians based on the dying and rising "godmen" collectively known as Osiris-Dionysus, whose worship the authors claim was manifested in the mystery religions of Osiris, Dionysus, Attis, and Mithras.

The authors propose that Jesus did not literally exist as an historically identifiable individual, but was instead a syncretic re-interpretation of the fundamental pagan "godman" by the Gnostics, who the authors assert were the original sect of Christianity. Freke and Gandy argue that orthodox Christianity was not the predecessor to Gnosticism, but a later outgrowth that rewrote history in order to make literal Christianity appear to predate the Gnostics. They describe their theory as the "Jesus Mysteries thesis".

== Thesis ==
Freke and Gandy base The Jesus Mysteries thesis partly on a series of parallels between their suggested biography of Osiris-Dionysus and the biography of Jesus drawn from the four canonical gospels. Their suggested reconstruction of the myth of Osiris-Dionysus, compiled from the myths of ancient dying and resurrected "godmen," bears a striking resemblance to the gospel accounts. The authors give a short list of parallels:

- Osiris-Dionysus is God made flesh, the savior and "Son of God."
- His father is God and his mother is a mortal virgin, 7 month pregnancy.
- He is born in a cave or humble cowshed on 25 December before three shepherds.
- He offers his followers the chance to be born again through the rites of baptism.
- He miraculously turns water into wine at a marriage ceremony.
- He rides triumphantly into town on a donkey while people wave palm leaves to honor him.
- He dies at Eastertime as a sacrifice for the sins of the world.
- After his death he descends to hell, then on the third day he rises from the dead and ascends to heaven in glory.
- His followers await his return as the judge during the Last Days.
- His death and resurrection are celebrated by a ritual meal of bread and wine, which symbolize his body and blood.

According to The Jesus Mysteries, Christianity originated as a Judaized version of the pagan mystery religions. Hellenized Jews wrote a version of the godman myth incorporating Jewish elements. Initiates learned the myth and its allegorical meanings through the Outer and Inner Mysteries. A similar pattern of "Lesser" and "Greater" Mysteries was part of the pagan Eleusinian Mysteries. Mithraism was structured around seven serial initiations.

Freke and Gandy suggest that, at some point, groups of Christians who had only experienced the Outer Mysteries was an exoteric push under Constantine in the 3rd Century, to align and organize the Roman state religion. Where those who opposed, along with the extensive mass destruction of supporting text, were silenced, with all trace of opposition to the Roman designated state religion destroyed.

Any encountered groups who had retained the Inner Mysteries, whom "Literalist Christians" [as Freke and Gandy] call the "Gnostics”, were discredited and labeled as unorthodox for claiming that what the Literalists considered false knowledge and false initiations, when in all actuality was a prime example role reversal, as the Gnostics, per the Gospel of Thomas, was written and evidence linked establishing the Gnostics earlier in time than the documentation found within the New Testament as we know it.

Freke and Gandy claim that the Literalists won out when the emperor Constantine saw the political merit of 'one empire, one emperor, one god', practically exterminated the Gnostics, and saw to it that 'Literalist Christianity' became the officially-approved Roman Catholic Church and its modern descendants.

== Reception ==
Chris Forbes, an ancient historian and senior lecturer at Macquarie University in Sydney has criticised the work, noting that Freke and Gandy are "not real scholars, they are popularisers." He calls their arguments about Jesus "grossly misconceived, and their attempt to draw links between Jesus and various pagan god-men is completely muddled. It looks impressive because of the sheer mass of the material, but when you break it down and look at it point by point, it really comes to pieces."

Paul Barnett, a bishop and New Testament scholar who has authored several books on the historical Jesus, argues that a good proportion of the citations are out of date. "Like the Gnostics, Freke and Gandy have a mystical mindset and therefore oppose Christianity as grounded in history," he wrote. "They hate the idea that the incarnation of the Son of God and his resurrection could have been a matter of actual flesh and blood and time and place."

When the BBC approached N. T. Wright, an Anglican bishop and New Testament scholar, asking him to debate Freke and Gandy concerning their thesis in The Jesus Mysteries, Wright replied that "this was like asking a professional astronomer to debate with the authors of a book claiming the moon was made of green cheese."

New Testament scholar and secular agnostic Bart D. Ehrman, in a 2007 interview with the Fortean Times, was similarly asked for his views on the work of Freke and Gandy. Not having read their work, he responded by commenting on the thesis, "This is an old argument, even though it shows up every 10 years or so. This current craze that Christianity was a mystery religion like these other mystery religions-the people who are saying this are almost always people who know nothing about the mystery religions; they've read a few popular books, but they're not scholars of mystery religions. The reality is, we know very little about mystery religions-the whole point of mystery religions is that they're secret! So I think it's crazy to build on ignorance in order to make a claim like this." In his 2012 book Did Jesus Exist?, Ehrman, now having actually read the book, addresses many of Freke and Gandy's assertions, demonstrating why they do not hold up to scholarly criticism. According to Ehrman's analysis, most of Freke and Gandy's alleged evidence is either fabricated, the result of gross misinterpretation, or a mandela-effect-like phenomenon in which information is distorted by meta-societal factors based on the claims of other writers rather than actual historical evidence. Ehrman concludes, "This is not serious scholarship. It is sensationalist writing driven by a desire to sell books." He also remarks that "In both its detail and its overarching thesis, the book often reads like an undergraduate thesis, filled with patently false information and inconsistencies." He then provides a long list of examples of serious historical errors in the book, as well as places where Freke and Gandy's own arguments contradict each other.

James Hannam has alleged that one of the artifacts that the authors rely on, a depiction of Orpheus on a cross, is a fake. This is a claim on which there is not scholarly consensus, as the artifact went missing during World War II.

Author and activist Richard Carrier has stated that The Jesus Mysteries "will disease" a reader's "mind with rampant unsourced falsehoods and completely miseducate". Although Carrier himself supports the view that Jesus was not a real person, he has condemned the viewpoints on "ancient world and ancient religion" presented in The Jesus Mysteries as ludicrous and without merit.

== See also ==
- Christ myth theory
- Historicity of Jesus
- Josephus on Jesus
