= Gerald O'Collins =

Australian Catholic priest and theologian (1931–2024)

The Reverend Gerald O'Collins SJ AC
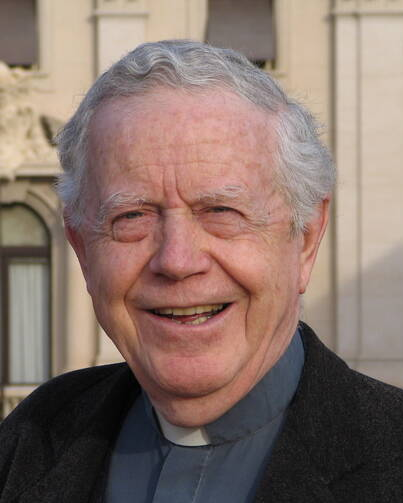
- O'Collins in 2015
- Born: Gerald Glynn O'Collins; 2 July 1931; Melbourne, Victoria, Australia
- Died: 22 August 2024 (aged 93); Melbourne, Victoria, Australia

Ecclesiastical career
- Religion: Christianity (Roman Catholic)
- Church: Latin Church
- Ordained: 1963 (priest)

Academic background
- Education: University of Melbourne; Heythrop College, London; University of Cambridge
- Influences: Augustine; Plato; Thomas Aquinas

Academic work
- Discipline: Theology
- Institutions: Pembroke College, Cambridge; Jesuit Theological College; Pontifical Gregorian University
- Main interests: Christology; ecumenism; fundamental theology; systematic theology

Gerald Glynn O'Collins SJ AC (2 July 1931 – 22 August 2024) was an Australian Jesuit priest and academic. He was a research professor and writer-in-residence at the Jesuit Theological College (JTC) in Parkville, Victoria, and a research professor in theology at St Mary's University College in Twickenham. For more than three decades, he was professor of systematic and fundamental theology at the Pontifical Gregorian University (Rome).

In 2006, O'Collins was made a Companion of the General Division of the Order of Australia (AC), in recognition of his outstanding commitment to theological scholarship and ecumenical initiatives.

== Life and career ==
O'Collins was born in Melbourne, Australia on 2 July 1931, and educated at Xavier College. His maternal grandfather Paddy Glynn was a federal government minister, while his sister Maev O'Collins became a professor at the University of Papua New Guinea. O'Collins studied at the University of Melbourne, where he took both a first-class honours baccalaureate degree and a master's degree. He was ordained a Roman Catholic priest in 1963 and went on to earn a Licentiate in Sacred Theology (STL) at Heythrop College, Oxfordshire, in 1967. The next year he was made a Doctor of Theology by Cambridge University, where he held a research fellowship at Pembroke College. He taught at the Weston School of Theology (Boston Theological Institute) in Cambridge, Massachusetts, and the Jesuit Theological College in Melbourne for five years before accepting a professorship at the Gregorian University in Rome in 1973. He taught there until 2006. Additionally, he served as dean of the theological faculty for six years. After retiring from the Gregorian he was named research professor at St. Mary's University College.

O'Collins received several honorary doctorates: from the University of San Francisco (1991), University of Surrey (2003), Sacred Heart University (Bridgeport, Conn.) (2004); John Carroll University (Cleveland, Ohio) (2007); and a Doctor of Divinity from Melbourne College of Divinity (2007); Honorary adjunct professor of Australian Catholic University (2007–2010).

O'Collins organised and co-chaired international ecumenical symposia on the Resurrection (1996), the Trinity (1998), the Incarnation (2000), the Redemption (2003), and the legacy of Pope John Paul II (2008), also co-editing their proceedings. He returned to Australia in 2009.

O'Collins was an honorary visitor and a visiting scholar at Pembroke College, and served as an honorary adjunct professor at the Australian Catholic University. He delivered the Fisher Lecture and the Margaret Beaufort Lecture at Cambridge and the Cardinal Hume Lectures at Heythrop College. Amongst other honours, he was the recipient of the Malipiero Prize, the Stefano Borgia European Prize, and the Johannes Quasten Medal given by Catholic University of America.

O'Collins died in Melbourne on 22 August 2024, at the age of 93.

== Selected works ==
- Inspiration. Towards a Christian Interpretation of Biblical Inspiration. Oxford: Oxford University Press. 2018. ISBN 978-0198824183.
- A Christology of Religions. Maryknoll (NY): Orbis Books. 2018. ISBN 978-1626982819.
- Christology: Origins, Developments Baylor University Press, 2015. ISBN 9781481302562.
- O'Collins, Gerald; Farrugia, Mario (2015). Catholicism: The Story of Catholic Christianity (2nd ed.). Oxford: Oxford University Press. ISBN 9780198728184.
- Light from Light: Scientists and Theologians in Dialogue (ed. with Mary Ann Meyers) Wm. B. Eerdmans, 2011. ISBN 978-0802866677
- Rethinking Fundamental Theology OUP, 2011. ISBN 978-0199605569
- Jesus Our Priest: A Christian Approach to the Priesthood of Christ (with Michael Keenan Jones) OUP, 2010. ISBN 978-0199576456
- Catholicism. A Very Short Introduction OUP, 2008. ISBN 978-0199545919
- The Legacy of John Paul II (ed. with Michael Hayes) Continuum, 2008. ISBN 978-0860124405
- Jesus: A Portrait Darton, Longman & Todd, 2008. ISBN 978-1570757839
- Salvation for All. God's Other Peoples OUP, 2008. ISBN 978-0199238897
- Pope John Paul II. A Reader (with D Kendall and J LaBelle) Paulist Press, 2007. ISBN 978-0809144792
- Christ Our Redeemer. A Christian Approach to Salvation OUP, 2007. ISBN 978-0199203130
- The Lord's Prayer Darton, Longman & Todd, 2006. ISBN 978-0809144884 (Paulist Press ed.)
- Living Vatican II. The 21st Council for the 21st Century, Paulist Press, 2006 (awarded best theology book of 2006 by the Catholic Press Association of the United States and of Canada). ISBN 978-0809142903
- Following the Way: Jesus Our Spiritual Director Paulist Press, 2000. ISBN 978-0809139842
- Christology: A Biblical, Historical, and Systematic Study of Jesus OUP, 1995 – rev. 2nd ed. 2009. ISBN 978-0199557875
- Jesus Risen: An Historical, Fundamental, and Systematic Examination of Christ's Resurrection Paulist Press, 1987. ISBN 0809103931
- Davis, Stephen T., Kendall, Daniel and O'Collins, Gerald (1998) The Resurrection: An Interdisciplinary Symposium on the Resurrection of Jesus. Oxford: Oxford University Press

== See also ==
- Catholic Church and ecumenism
- Resurrection Summit
