= 1987 Birthday Honours =

UK government national awards

Queen's Birthday Honours are announced on or around the date of the Queen's Official Birthday in Australia, Canada, New Zealand and the United Kingdom. The dates vary, both from year to year and from country to country. All are published in supplements to the London Gazette and many are conferred by the monarch (or her representative) some time after the date of the announcement, particularly for those service people on active duty.

The 1987 Queen's Birthday honours lists were announced on 13 June 1987.

Recipients of honours are shown below as they were styled before their new honour.

== United Kingdom ==
=== Life Peers ===
==== Barons ====
- Sir (Amos) Henry Chilver, Chairman, Milton Keynes Development Corporation; Vice-Chancellor, Cranfield Institute of Technology.
- Sir Philip (Douglas) Knights, C.B.E., Q.P.M., D.L. Former Chief Constable, West Midlands Police.

=== Privy Counsellors ===
- Dr Rhodes Boyson, Minister of State for Local Government, Department of the Environment.
- Lynda, Mrs Chalker, Minister of State, Foreign and Commonwealth Office.

=== Knights Bachelor ===
- James George Ackers, Chairman, West Midlands Regional Health Authority.
- George Blunden, Deputy Governor, Bank of England.
- Neville Bruce Alfred Bosworth, C.B.E. For political and public service.
- Anthony Alfred Caro, C.B.E., Sculptor.
- Clifford Jack Chetwood, Chairman and Chief Executive, George Wimpey plc.
- Peter Leslie Crill, C.B.E., Bailiff of Jersey.
- David Lance Crouch. For political service.
- Colin Terence Dollery, Professor of Clinical Pharmacology, Royal Postgraduate Medical School.
- Hugh Spencer Lisle Dundas, C.B.E., D.S.O., D.F.C., Chairman, British Electric Traction plc.
- Professor Roger James Elliott. For services to Theoretical Physics and National Computing.
- Archibald William Forster, Chairman and Chief Executive, Esso UK plc.
- David Armand Hopkin, Chief Metropolitan Magistrate.
- Anthony Seymour Laughton, Director, Institute of Oceanographic Sciences, Natural Environment Research Council.
- Leslie Thomas Loader, C.B.E. For political and public service.
- John Lyons. For services to the Study of Linguistics.
- Colin Marsh Marshall, Chief Executive, British Airways plc.
- Bryan Hubert Nicholson, Chairman, Manpower Services Commission.
- Alan Turner Peacock, D.S.C. For public service.
- Basil Edward Rhodes, C.B.E., T.D., D.L. For political and public service.
- Robert Scholey, C.B.E., Chairman, British Steel Corporation.
- Albert Edward Sloman, C.B.E., Vice-Chancellor, University of Essex.
- Robert Courtney Smith, C.B.E. For services to Industry in Scotland.
- Robert William Wall, O.B.E. For political and public service.
- John Michael Wickerson, President, The Law Society.

=== Order of the Bath ===
==== Knight Commander of the Order of the Bath (KCB) ====
Military Division

Royal Navy

- Vice Admiral David Benjamin Bathurst.
- Vice Admiral William Richard Scott Thomas, O.B.E.

Army

- Lieutenant General David John Ramsbotham, C.B.E. (427439), late The Royal Green Jackets. Colonel Commandant 2nd Battalion The Royal Green Jackets.
- Lieutenant General Antony Kenneth Frederick Walker (437194), Colonel Commandant Royal Tank Regiment.

Royal Air Force

- Air Marshal Laurence Alfred Jones, C.B., A.F.C., Royal Air Force.

Civil Division

- John Bilsland Bailey, C.B., H.M. Procurator General and Treasury Solicitor.
- John Niall Henderson Blelloch, C.B., Second Permanent Under Secretary of State, Ministry of Defence.
- Kenneth Percy Bloomfield, C.B., Head of Northern Ireland Civil Service and Second Permanent Under Secretary of State, Northern Ireland Office.
- Terence Michael Heiser, C.B., Permanent Secretary, Department of the Environment.

==== Companion of the Order of the Bath (CB) ====
Military Division

Royal Navy

- Major General John St John Grey.
- Rear Admiral Ronald Victor Holley.
- Rear Admiral Andrew John Richmond.

Army

- Major General John Boyne, M.B.E., late Corps of Royal Electrical and Mechanical Engineers.
- Major General Anthony Showan Jeapes, O.B.E., M.C., late The Devonshire and Dorset Regiment.
- Major General Denis Edgar Ryan, late Royal Army Educational Corps.
- Major General Keith Spacie, O.B.E., late The Parachute Regiment.
- Major General Alan Yeoman, late Royal Corps of Signals, Honorary Colonel 37 (Wessex and Welsh) Signal Regiment (Volunteers).

Royal Air Force

- Air Vice-Marshal Derek Thomas Bryant, O.B.E., Royal Air Force.
- Air Vice-Marshal Peter Francis King, O.B.E., Q.H.S., Royal Air Force.
- The Venerable Glyndwr Rhys Renowden, Q.H.C., Royal Air Force.

Civil Division

- Eric James Bolton, Senior Chief Inspector of Schools, Department of Education and Science.
- Frank Cassell, Deputy Secretary, H.M. Treasury.
- Bernard Maurice Day, Assistant Under Secretary of State, Ministry of Defence.
- Ian Dean, Crown Agent, Crown Office, Edinburgh.
- William Norman Drummond, Under Secretary, Department of Economic Development, Northern Ireland.
- David Murray Elliott, Minister and Deputy UK Permanent Representative to the European Communities.
- Cecil Bentley-Innes Glass, Foreign and Commonwealth Office.
- Peter Graham Heard, Deputy Chief Valuer, Board of Inland Revenue.
- (Walter) Patrick Jackson, Grade 3, Department of Transport.
- James Christopher Jenkins, Parliamentary Counsel, Office of the Parliamentary Counsel.
- Clifford Harold Alfred Judd, Grade 3, H.M. Treasury.
- Gordon Harry Lakes, M.C., Deputy Director General of the Prison Service.
- Arthur Bryan Martin, Under Secretary, Health and Safety Executive.
- Ian Dalgleish Penman, Deputy Secretary, Scottish Office.
- Bryan Roy Rayner, Deputy Secretary, Department of Health and Social Security.
- Donald Maurice Spiers, T.D., Controller of R. & D. Establishments, Research and Nuclear Programmes, Ministry of Defence.

=== Order of St Michael and St George ===
==== Knight Grand Cross of the Order of St Michael and St George (GCMG) ====
- Sir John Fretwell, K.C.M.G., lately H.M. Ambassador, Paris.

==== Knight Commander of the Order of St Michael and St George (KCMG) ====
- Ewen Alastair John Fergusson, H.M. Ambassador-designate, Paris.
- Derek Morison David Thomas, C.M.G., H.M. Ambassador-designate, Rome.

==== Companion of the Order of St Michael and St George (CMG) ====
- Roger Arnold Rowlandson Barltrop, C.V.O., British High Commissioner, Suva.
- John Brasnett, Deputy British High Commissioner, Bombay.
- Michael St Edmund Burton, C.V.O., Minister and Deputy Commandant, British Military Government, Berlin.
- John Olav Kerr, lately Counsellor and Head of Chancery, H.M. Embassy, Washington.
- Alastair Christopher Donald Summerhayes MacRae, Minister and Head of British Interests Section, Royal Swedish Embassy, Tehran.
- Richard Alvin Neilson, L.V.O., H.M. Ambassador, Bogota.
- Miss Lilian Pauline Neville-Jones, lately Foreign and Commonwealth Office.
- Andrew Eustice Palmer, C.V.O., H.M. Ambassador, Havana.
- Derek William Partridge, British High Commissioner, Freetown.
- Peter Edward Rosling, L.V.O., British High Commissioner, Maseru.
- George Neil Smith, Foreign and Commonwealth Office.
- Kenneth Campbell Wright, O.B.E., Foreign and Commonwealth Office.

=== Royal Victorian Order ===
==== Knight Grand Cross of the Royal Victorian Order (GCVO) ====
- Lieutenant Colonel Sir John Frederick Dame Johnston, K.C.V.O., M.C.
- Lieutenant Colonel Sir John Mansel Miller, K.C.V.O., D.S.O., M.C.

==== Knight Commander of the Royal Victorian Order (KCVO) ====
- Major George Victor Sheridan Le Fanu.

==== Commander of the Royal Victorian Order (CVO) ====
- Martin Somervell Argles.
- Fiona, Mrs Henderson L.V.O.
- Group Captain Sir Gordon Hamish Martin Pirie, C.B.E.
- Leonard Albert George Soper, Q.P.M.

==== Lieutenant of the Royal Victorian Order (LVO) ====
- Chief Superintendent James Wallace Beaton, G.C., Metropolitan Police.
- Anthony Scott Crawford.
- John Haslam.
- David Hugh Heath.
- Michael George Paul Kelly, M.V.O.
- Martin Rowley Melville Leslie.
- Lucy Annora, Mrs Murphy, M.V.O.
- Christopher Miles Perrins.
- Philip Lee Thornton.

==== Member of the Royal Victorian Order (MVO) ====
- Squadron Leader Roger Charles Tavener Bent, Royal Air Force.
- Eileen Barbara, Mrs Bishop.
- Warrant Officer Class I Alexander Dumon, M.B.E., Coldstream Guards.
- Miss Maud Florence Lillian Joan Jones.
- Oswald Lewis.
- Charles Francis Martyn.
- Arthur Edgar Parish.
- James Bertram Smith.

=== Royal Victorian Medal (RVM) ===
==== Royal Victorian Medal (Silver) ====
- Raymond Allington.
- Jack Brown.
- John Brown.
- Divisional Sergeant Major John Cawthorne, The Queen's Body Guard of the Yeomen of the Guard.
- Douglas Alan Goodship.
- Chief Technician George Martin Henderson, Royal Air Force.
- Chief Technician Allan Hogan, Royal Air Force.
- Dennis Stanley Mace.
- Ronald Stephen Muir.
- Cecil John Nelson.
- Anthony Vernon Parnell.
- Miss May Quail Motion Prentice.
- Gilbert Frederick Reed.
- Peter James Rouse.
- Christine, Mrs Skinner.
- Chief Radio Supervisor Nigel Robert Sullivan.
- Divisional Sergeant Major Leslie Haywood Trimming, The Queen's Body Guard of the Yeomen of the Guard.

=== Order of the British Empire ===
==== Knight Grand Cross of the Order of the British Empire (GBE) ====
- Sir Kenneth Leslie Newman, Q.P.M., Commissioner, Metropolitan Police.
- Edwin Noel, Baron Plowden, K.C.B., K.B.E. For public services.

==== Dame Commander of the Order of the British Empire (DBE) ====
- Miss Elizabeth Ursula Chesterton, O.B.E., Architect and Town Planner.
- Miss Elizabeth Violet Maconchy, C.B.E. (Mrs Le Fanu), Composer.

==== Knight Commander of the Order of the British Empire (KBE) ====
- David Wigley Nickson, C.B.E., D.L., President, Confederation of British Industry.
- John Roundell, Earl of Selborne, D.L., Chairman, Agricultural and Food Research Council.
- Harold Martin Smith Reid, C.M.G., lately British High Commissioner, Kingston.

==== Commander of the Order of the British Empire (CBE) ====
Military Division

- Captain George Victor Buxton, Royal Navy.
- Captain John Marsh, Royal Navy.
- Captain George Matheson Tullis, Royal Navy.
- Brigadier Anthony Stephen Jeremy Blacker, O.B.E., late Royal Tank Regiment.
- Colonel Patrick John Daniell, late Royal Regiment of Artillery (now retired).
- Colonel John Cawdron Langlands, late the Queen's Own Highlanders (Seaforths and Camerons).
- Brigadier Robert Brian Macgregor-Oakford, O.B.E., M.C., late the Light Infantry, Deputy Colonel the Light Infantry (Durham).
- Colonel Joseph Hubbard Milburn, O.B.E., late The King's Own Royal Border Regiment.
- Brigadier Geoffrey Chartres Safford, late Royal Regiment of Artillery.
- Colonel (now acting Brigadier) Clive Anthony Wilkinson, late Royal Regiment of Artillery.
- Group Captain Peter George Beer, L.V.O., O.B.E., Royal Air Force.
- Air Commodore Peter Joseph Alan Chislett, M.B.E., Royal Air Force.
- Group Captain Brian Martin Humphries, O.B.E., Royal Air Force.
- Group Captain Thomas Graham Rowland Osborn, O.B.E., Royal Air Force.

Civil Division

- Douglas Ian Acres, O.B.E., D.L., Chairman, Council of the Magistrates' Association.
- John Francis Avery Jones. For services in the field of revenue law.
- Eric Billingsley Bates, Grade 5, Department of Trade and Industry.
- Ronald Frank Bishop, lately Managing Director, Whessoe Heavy Engineering Ltd.
- Christopher Wadsworth Brierley, Managing Director, Economic Planning, British Gas plc.
- Brian Bernard Bushell, Foreign and Commonwealth Office.
- Ronald Herbert Butt, formerly Associate Editor, The Times. For services to journalism.
- Donald Campbell, Professor of Anaesthetics, University of Glasgow.
- Gordon Verner Carr, Chairman, Port of Tyne Authority.
- Michael James Frederick Carter. For political and public service.
- Denis Marsden Child, Chairman, Executive Committee, British Bankers' Association.
- Kenneth James Clark, Chief Executive, Borders Regional Council.
- John Robert Clayton, Chairman, Agricultural Training Board.
- Peter Bridgeman Cocks. For political and public service.
- Francis Joseph Cogan, lately Chairman, Hertfordshire County Council.
- Douglas Cooke, Director, Royal Ordnance, Leeds plc.
- Robert George Cooper, Chairman, Fair Employment Agency, Northern Ireland.
- Professor John Terence Coppock. For services to Geography.
- Roy Arthur Cox, lately Chairman of Council, Building Societies Association.
- Ronald Duncan Cramond, Deputy Chairman, Highlands and Islands Development Board.
- William Peter Davey, lately Chief Executive, South Glamorgan County Council.
- Brynley Davies, M.B.E., Chairman, Mid-Glamorgan Area Health Authority.
- James Burnside Diamond. For services to the Pharmaceutical Industry.
- Roy Duckworth, Professor of Oral Medicine, University of London.
- Peter Robin Dugdale, Managing Director, Guardian Royal Exchange plc.
- Jack Edelman, Director, Rank Hovis McDougall plc.
- Clive Arthur Peirson Foxell. For services to Microelectronics Research, Science and Engineering Research Council.
- Robert David Eric Gallagher, O.B.E. For services to community relations in Northern Ireland.
- David John Gee, Professor of Forensic Medicine, University of Leeds.
- Frederick John Pym Gore, Painter.
- Duncan Gilmour Graham, lately County Education Officer, Suffolk.
- Kenneth Graham, O.B.E., Deputy General Secretary, Trades Union Congress.
- George Howell Guest, Organist, St John's College, Cambridge.
- Nils Erik Heijne, Principal Planning Inspector, Department of the Environment.
- Stuart David Hollander, Chairman, Cotton and Allied Textiles Economic Development Committee.
- Anthony Philip Hopkins, Actor.
- William Young Hughes, Chairman and Chief Executive, Grampian Holdings plc.
- Professor Laurence Colvin Hunter. For services to Industrial Relations.
- Trevor Jones, lately Grade 4, Ministry of Defence.
- Terence Kevin Kilmartin, lately Literary Editor, The Observer.
- Peter Large, M.B.E., Chairman, Joint Committee on Mobility for the Disabled.
- David George Thomas Linnell, lately Chairman, Eggs Authority.
- John Lister, lately Chairman, Imperial Chemical Industries Fibres plc.
- Frederick Mervyn Barton Loane, Chairman, Western Health and Social Services Board.
- John Richard Long, Under Secretary, Department of Health and Social Security.
- Major Michael Hildesley Lycett. For political service.
- Alistair Graham Lynn, Q.P.M., Chief Constable, Grampian Police.
- Miss Anne Catherine Macnaghten (Mrs Ashby). For services to Music.
- Robert Ian McCallum, lately Professor and Head of Department of Occupational Health and Hygiene, University of Newcastle upon Tyne.
- Thomas Bryce McCrirrick, Director of Engineering, British Broadcasting Corporation.
- Iain Alastair McCrone. For political and public service.
- John Henderson McKay, Lord Provost, City of Edinburgh.
- Alan Meikle, Property Director, Hereford and Worcester County Council.
- Claire Allan Ure, Mrs Morrison. For political and public service.
- Basil Clifford Morson, V.R.D. For services to Gastro-intestinal Pathology.
- John Mulkern, lately Managing Director, British Airports Authority plc.
- Professor William Frederick Nash, Chairman, Home Defence Scientific Advisory Committee.
- Professor John Parnaby, Group Director, Manufacturing Technology, Lucas Industries plc.
- Alastair Craig Paterson, Senior Partner, Bullen and Partners, Consulting Engineers.
- David Daniel August Piesold, Senior Partner, Watermeyer, Legge, Piesold and Uhlmann. For services to Export.
- David Martin Portsmouth, Senior Principal Inspector of Taxes, Board of Inland Revenue.
- Philip Michael Rivers Pouncey. For services to Art.
- John Geoffrey Powell, Chairman, Property Advisory Group, Department of the Environment.
- Ralph Nicholas Quartano, Chief Executive, Postel Investment Management Ltd.
- William Reid, Director, National Army Museum.
- Michael Francis Reidy, Assistant Secretary, Department of Energy.
- James Philip Rettie, T.D. Chairman, Sea Fish Industry Authority.
- James Arthur Rigg, Director of Finance, Rolls-Royce plc.
- William Rennie Ritchie, H.M. Depute Senior Chief Inspector of Schools, Scottish Education Department.
- Raymond Frank Michael Robbins, Director, Plymouth Polytechnic.
- Peter Levin Shaffer, Playwright and Critic.
- Sally, Lady Sherman, Chairman, Newham Health Authority.
- Godfrey Stephen Shingles, Managing Director, Digital Equipment Company Ltd.
- Professor Zangwill Aubrey Silberston, Adviser on Trade and Industry Policy to the Department of Trade and Industry.
- Anthony David Smith, Director, British Film Institute.
- John Stevenson, Secretary, Association of County Councils.
- Colonel James Stirling, T.D., lately Chairman, Highland Territorial Auxiliary and Volunteer Reserve Association.
- Geoffrey Gilbert Stockwell, Director, Cluff Oil plc.
- Miss Maude Storey, Registrar and Chief Executive, U.K. Central Council for Nursing Midwifery and Health Visiting.
- Roger Whitley Suddards. For public service in West Yorkshire.
- Brian Russell Thorpe, Chief Executive and Deputy Chairman, Southern Water Authority.
- Ray Stanley Tindle, O.B.E., Chairman, Tindle Newspapers Ltd.
- Martin Edward O'Keeffe Trowbridge, Director General, Chemical Industries Association.
- Cedric Edward Turner, Professor in Strength of Materials, Imperial College of Science and Technology, University of London.
- John Hyslop Walker, Director, Scottish Examination Board.
- Victor Hugo Watson, Chairman, John Waddington plc.
- Francis Vernon Webster, Grade 5, Department of Transport.
- William Denison Whitmore, Assistant Secretary, Board of Customs and Excise.
- Kenneth Francis Whittle, lately Chairman, South Western Electricity Board.
- Graham Wight, lately Assistant Chief Veterinary Officer, Ministry of Agriculture, Fisheries and Food.
- Allison Grahame, Mrs Wilson. For political and public service.
- Peter Northcote Wilson, Professor of Agriculture and Rural Economy, Head of School of Agriculture, University of Edinburgh.
- Colin Jex Draper. For services to British commercial interests in New York.
- Dr Brian Mellor Greenwood, Director, Medical Research Council Laboratories, The Gambia.
- Martin Hime, H.M. Consul-General, Houston.
- John Findlay Scott, lately Director, Office of the Legal Counsel, United Nations, New York.
- John Joseph Swaine, O.B.E., Q.C., J.P. For public services in Hong Kong.
- John Alan Thornber. For services to British aviation interests in Germany.
- Ernest Winthrop Peniston Vesey. For public services in Bermuda.
- Wong Po-yan O.B.E., J.P. for public services in Hong Kong.

==== Officer of the Order of the British Empire (OBE) ====
Military Division

Royal Navy

- The Reverend Peter Dixon Ainsley, Royal Navy.
- Commander Ian David Anderson, Royal Navy.
- Commander Paul Branscombe, Royal Navy.
- Major (Local Lieutenant Colonel) Brian Loftus Carter, Royal Marines.
- Commander (Acting Captain) Duncan John Ellin, Royal Navy.
- Commander Robert William Hutchings, Royal Navy.
- Commander Robin Michael Kennedy, Royal Navy.
- Commander (Acting Captain) John Bevan Lean, Royal Navy.
- Surgeon Commander Roger James Leicester, Royal Navy.
- Commander John Joseph McDonough, Royal Navy.
- Commander John Mankerty, Royal Navy.
- Commander (CCF) Stuart Nichol Robertson, Royal Naval Reserve.

Army

- Acting Colonel Frederick James John Bartlett, Army Cadet Force.
- Lieutenant Colonel William Guy Colin Bowles, M.B.E., 14th/20th King's Hussars.
- Lieutenant Colonel Peter Richard Courtney-Green, M.B.E., Royal Army Ordnance Corps.
- Lieutenant Colonel Charles Nigel Cullen, T.D., The Worcestershire and Sherwood Foresters Regiment, Territorial Army.
- Lieutenant Colonel Peter Charles Durbin, T.D., Royal Corps of Transport, Territorial Army.
- Lieutenant Colonel (Quartermaster) Rodney Goodman, B.E.M., Royal Corps of Signals (now retired).
- Lieutenant Colonel Gordon Cyril Gray, Royal Tank Regiment.
- Lieutenant Colonel (now Acting Colonel) Jonathan Michael Francis Cooper Hall, The Royal Scots Dragoon Guards (Carabiniers and Greys).
- Lieutenant Colonel Peter Brian Hewlett-Smith, Corps of Royal Military Police.
- Lieutenant Colonel Alistair Stuart Hastings Irwin, The Black Watch (Royal Highland Regiment).
- Lieutenant Colonel James Frank Johnson, Corps of Royal Engineers.
- Lieutenant Colonel (Quartermaster) Stanley Charles Manning, Corps of Royal Military Police.
- The Reverend Paul Michael Rich, Chaplain to the Forces 2nd Class, Royal Army Chaplains' Department.
- Lieutenant Colonel Robert Lynn Stevens, M.B.E., The Duke of Wellington's Regiment (West Riding).
- Lieutenant Colonel Richard Douglas Vellacott, The Light Infantry.
- Lieutenant Colonel Edward John Worley Walker, The Duke of Wellington's Regiment (West Riding).
- Lieutenant Colonel Robin John Stuart Wardle, Coldstream Guards.
- Lieutenant Colonel Robert Sime Burnett Watson, The Royal Scots (The Royal Regiment).

Royal Air Force

- Wing Commander Samuel James Barclay, Royal Air Force.
- Wing Commander John Alwyn Dickson, Royal Air Force Volunteer Reserve (Training).
- Wing Commander Brian Michael Doyle, Royal Air Force.
- Wing Commander Michael William Sayle Grigson, Royal Air Force.
- Wing Commander John Harold Haines, Royal Air Force.
- Wing Commander Philip Langrill, Royal Air Force.
- Wing Commander Donald John Moyce, Royal Air Force.
- Wing Commander Richard Northcote, Royal Air Force.
- Wing Commander Michael John Perrett, Royal Air Force.
- Wing Commander David Henry Phillips, Royal Air Force.
- Wing Commander Huw Rees, Royal Air Force.

Civil Division

- Edward Norman Addison, Chairman, The Addison Tool Company Ltd.
- Derek Brodie Agutter, lately Head of Combined Services Entertainment, Services Sound and Vision Corporation.
- George Alexander Barrie Anderson, Chairman, Scottish Farm and Food Group.
- Kathleen Janette, Mrs Anderson, Deputy Principal, Napier College of Commerce and Technology, Edinburgh.
- Walter Philip Appleyard. For services to Hockey.
- Arthur Samuel Ashton, Headmaster, Elaine Avenue Primary School, Strood, Kent.
- Harold Norman Aves. For services to the Potato Industry, Northern Ireland.
- Kenneth Baddiley, District General Manager, Leicestershire Health Authority.
- Barbara, Lady Banks. For political service.
- William Victor Barbone, Director of Business Development, Marconi Communication Systems Ltd.
- Geoffrey Philip Barnes, Senior Principal, Office of Population Censuses and Surveys.
- John Geoffrey Batley, The Secretary, British Railways Board.
- Alan Maurice Arthur Battle, Secretary, British Food Export Council.
- Alexander Francis Beardmore, Engineer-in-Chief, The Post Office.
- Ian Holroyd Bell, Chairman and Managing Director, Pendennis Hotels Ltd.
- Beila Rochelle, Mrs Best, Director of Appeals Soldiers' Sailors' and Airmen's Families Association.
- William Derrick Biggs, Professor of Building Technology and Head of Department of Construction Management, University of Reading.
- Bernice Ann, Mrs Boot, Chairman, Governing Body, Rother Valley College of Further Education.
- Peter Francis Boreham, Consultant Surgeon and Urologist, Cheltenham General Hospital.
- Derek Keith Britto. For political service.
- Lieutenant Colonel St John Carslake Brooke Johnson (Retd.) M.B.E., lately Swordbearer, City of London.
- George Raymond Bramley Brown. For public service in Hampshire.
- Alexander Browne, Principal Officer, Telecommunications Group, Northern Ireland.
- James Henry Bruce, Chairman, Attendance Allowance Board, Northern Ireland.
- Thomas Walter Bunyan, Technical Director, Pilgrim Engineering Developments Limited.
- James Burke, Director, Institute of Higher Education, Liverpool.
- Eric Raymond Campbell, Governor II, South East Regional Office, H.M. Prison Service.
- John Campbell, Group Chief Executive, Economic Forestry Group.
- Alban Douglas Rendall Caroe. For services to the Conservation of Historic Churches and Buildings.
- Stanley Albert William Carslake, Divisional General Manager, Barclays Bank.
- Nigel Mark Chaldecott, Director-General, National Council of Building Material Producers.
- Robin Charles Guy Chesterman, Chairman, Norfolk and Suffolk Area Manpower Board, Manpower Services Commission.
- Donald Piers Chesworth. For services to Toynbee Hall.
- Terence Kilian Clarke. For political and public service.
- Philip John Cole, lately President, British College of Ophthalmic Opticians.
- Richard Bertram Coles, Vice Chairman, Psoriasis Association.
- Patricia, Mrs Collins. For political and public service.
- Peter Richard Carstairs Coni, Q.C. For services to Rowing.
- Neville Cormack. For political and public service.
- John Robert Cox, lately Government Contracts Manager, Remploy Ltd.
- Michael Crawford, Actor.
- Charles Cuff, Headmaster, Townhill Middle School, Southampton.
- Miss Pauline Ann Cutting, Surgeon, Medical Aid to Palestine.
- Laurence Patrick Dake. For services to Reservoir Engineering.
- John Lament Cameron Dall, Consultant Physician in Geriatric Medicine, Victoria Infirmary, Glasgow.
- Miss Sylvia Juliet Darley, Founder and General Administrator, Malcolm Sargent Cancer Fund for Children.
- Phoebe Mary, Mrs David. For services to the Magistracy.
- Raymond Arthur Davis, lately Assistant Principal Inspector of Accidents, Department of Transport.
- John Nelson Davison, Senior Principal, Scottish Office.
- David Walter Joseph Day, Grade 6, Department of the Environment.
- Richard Bearder de Zouche, Member, North West Industrial Development Board.
- John Brian Dellow, Operations Director, Racal-Vodafone Ltd.
- Philip Beddows Dickinson, Chairman, Tameside Sea Cadet Corps Unit.
- Colin Francis Dinsdale, Deputy Assistant Commissioner, Metropolitan Police.
- Roger Swinburne Dobson, Chairman, Computer Aided Design Group, Engineering Construction and Process Plant Economic Development Committee.
- Philip Kevin Dodd, Clerk to the Manchester Justices.
- Miss Fabia Drake (Mrs Turner), Actress.
- Anthony Ashford Dunn, General Manager, Baglan Bay Works, British Petroleum Chemicals Ltd.
- Miss Elizabeth Earl, Chief Nursing Officer, Cambridgeshire Health Authority.
- David Stirling Edgar. For services to Energy Conservation.
- Caryl John Edwards, Head Teacher, Amman Valley Comprehensive School, Ammanford, Dyfed.
- Vernon Aubrey Edwards, lately General Medical Practitioner. For services to Association Football.
- Roy Victor Egan, Grade 6, Department of Trade and Industry.
- Michael David Eldred, Chairman, National Committee of Local Valuation Panels.
- Richard David Field, Deputy Chairman, J. and J. Dyson plc. For services to the Sheffield Chamber of Commerce.
- Alan Fergus Finlayson, Reporter, Children's Panel, Lothian Region.
- Gilbert Roy Fletcher, For charitable services.
- John Barrie Florentine, Q.P.M., Deputy Chief Constable, West Mercia Constabulary.
- Daniel John Plunder, M.C., V.R.D., lately Leader, United Kingdom Employers, InternationalLabour Organisation.
- Edward Sagar Fort, Chairman and Managing Director, Fort Vale Engineering Ltd.
- William Stevenson Fyfe, Chairman, Ayrshire and Arran Health Board.
- Sister Maire Teresa Gallagher. For services to Education.
- James Robertson Galloway, Deputy Chief Investigation Officer, Board of Customs and Excise.
- Michael William Gatting. For services to Cricket.
- Ronald Gerard. For charitable services.
- Arthur Allan Gibb, Director, Small Business Centre, Business School, Durham University.
- Faith, Mrs Gibson, Lecturer, Social Work, University of Ulster.
- (Philip) Stephen Gray, Director, Royal Liverpool Philharmonic Society.
- Donald Green, Chief Engineer, Generation Operation, South of Scotland Electricity Board.
- Margaret Cicely Langton, Mrs Greene. For services to Speech Therapy.
- Miss Joan Constance Valerie Greenleaf, Regional Pharmacist, North East Thames Regional Health Authority.
- Kenneth John Griffin, Inspector, Board of Inland Revenue.
- James Grigor, Managing Director, Ciba-Geigy Industrial Chemicals, Ciba-Geigy plc.
- Rowan Witherow Hamilton, lately Chairman, Local Enterprise Development Unit, Northern Ireland.
- John Donald Morrison Hardie. For services to Industry in Scotland.
- Harry Harris, Secretary, University of Birmingham.
- James Richard Harris. For political service.
- William Ivor Harris, Headteacher, Coombe Dean Comprehensive School, Plymouth.
- Giles Pollock Havergal, Director, Citizen's Theatre, Glasgow.
- Michael Richard Hawkins, County Engineer and Planning Officer, Devon County Council.
- Miss Ann Catherine Hay. For political service.
- Miss Audrey Helen Helliar. For political service.
- Miss Joan Hickson (Mrs Butler), Actress.
- Peter Charlesworth Hinchliffe, Foreign and Commonwealth Office.
- Alan Fionn Holford-Walker, lately Secretary, Council for the Protection of Rural England.
- Hugh Robert Mon Hughes, President, Farmers Union, Wales.
- Arthur William Hunt, Director of Social Services, Social Services Department, Hampshire County Council.
- Peter Dennis Ibbetson, lately Personnel Officer, Special Projects Generation and Construction Division, C.E.G.B.
- Arthur William Jacomb, County Surveyor, Hampshire County Council.
- Aubrey Lennard Hunton Jones, lately Regional Director, Business in the Community, Wales.
- David Kalderon, Assistant Managing Director, Turbine Generator Limited, General Electric Company plc.
- Keith Edwin Kirkham, Assistant Director Administration, Clinical Research Centre, Medical Research Council.
- Robert William Cecil Kirkwood, lately Chairman, Youth Committee for Northern Ireland.
- Cecil Gordon Knight, Headmaster, Small Heath Comprehensive School, Birmingham.
- Courtney Alexander Laws. For services to community relations in South London.
- David Andrew Leach, Potter.
- Christopher Anthony William Leng, D.L. For services to Agriculture.
- Frederick David Andrew Levitt. Partner, Levitt Bernstein Associates.
- George Donaldson Lockie. For services to Horticulture.
- Jack Lynch, Chief Inspector, The Gaming Board for Great Britain.
- David Chalmers Mackenzie, Rector, Falkirk High School.
- Barbara Joyce, Mrs Major. For services to the National Schizophrenia Fellowship.
- Geoffrey Marriott, Senior Principal, Board of Inland Revenue.
- Gordon Franklin Martin, Diplomatic and Commonwealth Correspondent, External Services, British Broadcasting Corporation.
- George McArthur, lately Chairman, Scottish Federation of Housing Associations.
- Elizabeth Roberta, Mrs McClatchey, Forensic Medical Officer, Queen's University, Belfast.
- Arthur Crawford McFarland, Member, Fire Authority, Northern Ireland.
- Edgar Michael McGahey, Chairman, West Country Tourist Board.
- Allan Douglas Mentz, Deputy Chairman, National Association of Youth Clubs.
- Professor Hamish Alexander Drummond Miles. For services to Art.
- Kenneth John Mills, Laboratory Testing Manager, Consumers Association.
- Martin Milner, Leader Hallé Orchestra.
- John Moore, Principal Professional and Technology Officer, Ministry of Defence.
- Keith Isadore Morell. For political and public service.
- Alexander Reid Morrison, lately Chief Administrative Medical Officer, Highland Health Board.
- Miss Suzanne Mary Mowat, Unit General Manager, Primary and Community, Hillingdon Health Authority.
- Octavius Nevin, Senior Principal, Ministry of Defence.
- Brian Anthony Nolan, Assistant Managing Director, Bracknell Division, Ferranti Computer Systems Limited.
- William Lyness Oakes, Chairman, Family Practitioner Committee, Gloucestershire.
- Desmond O'Brien, Deputy Chief Constable, Kent Constabulary.
- Arthur Owen, Inspector of Schools, Department of Education and Science.
- Charles Guy Pantin. For services to medical care in the Isle of Man.
- Robert George Parker-Eaton, M.B.E., Director, Customer Services and External Affairs, Britannia Airways.
- Martin Edwin Parry. For political and public service.
- Laurence Vaughan Penzer, lately Director of Sales, British Coal.
- John Alan Phillips, Headmaster, Graveney School, Wandsworth.
- John Harford Powell, M.C., Chairman, Sports Council for Wales.
- Wyndham Preece, lately Chief Executive Officer, Welsh National Board for Nursing, Midwifery and Health visiting.
- Peter Ralphs, Chief Probation Officer, Kent.
- Herbert George Riddlestone, Manager, Industrial Electronics Division, ERA Technology Ltd.
- Michael John Ridge, Chief Accountant, Civil Aviation Authority.
- John Seth Roberts, Director, Housing, Environmental Health, Colwyn Borough Council.
- William George Roberts. For services to the legal profession.
- Arthur Terence Robinson, D.S.C., Chairman, Coca-Cola Bottlers, Ulster, Ltd.
- Anthony James Rundell, Grade 6, Ministry of Defence.
- Philippa Margaret, Mrs Russell, Principal Officer, Voluntary Council for Handicapped Children, National Children's Bureau.
- David John Buckley Rutherford, Director, Sales, Martini and Rossi Ltd.
- Captain William Norman Saxby, R.E. (Retd.), Senior Principal Scientific Officer, Ministry of Defence.
- James Alexander Scott. For services to Agriculture.
- John McKie Scott, Chairman, Planning and Industrial Committee, Stockton Borough Council.
- Violet Helen, Mrs Scrine. For political and public service.
- George Charles Shaw. For political and public service.
- Harry Thompson Shires. For services to community relations in Birmingham.
- John Barry Eves Simmons, Curator, Royal Botanic Gardens, Kew.
- Brian Simpson, Director, Husband and Company.
- Robert MacPherson Simpson, Senior EngineeringInspector, Fire Service Inspectorate.
- John Michael Stamper, M.B.E., Director, East Midlands Association, Engineering Employers.
- David Harry Stanger, Managing Director, Harry Stanger Limited.
- Edward John Stocker, Chairman, Vanderhoff plc. For services to Export.
- Norman Ivor Storey, Master, United Towing Ltd.
- Rodney Strong, Technical Director, Rolls-Royce and Associates Limited.
- Robert Henry Sutton, Chairman, National Leader Training Advisory Board, The Scout Association.
- Elsie May, Mrs Sykes, Chairman, The Charles and Elsie Sykes Trust.
- David Edward Tench, lately Chairman, Domestic Coal Consumers' Council.
- Maureen, Mrs Tetley. For political and public service.
- Meyric Leslie Thomas. For political and public service.
- George Elliot Scott Thomson. For services to the Greenwich Hospital Northern Estates.
- Samuel Thorburn, Senior Director, Thorburn Associates.
- David George Thurlow, Senior Partner, Cambridge Design.
- Robert Tiffany, Chief Nurse and Director, Royal Marsden Hospital.
- John Harry Robert Timpson, Radio Presenter, British Broadcasting Corporation.
- Gerald Anthony Tinkler, Headmaster, Robert Bloomfield Middle School, Shefford, Bedfordshire.
- Donald Trafford, Senior Partner, Interface International. For services to Export.
- Oswald Leslie Turner, Principal Professional and Technology Officer, Department of the Environment.
- Barry Waite, Vice-President and General Manager, Semiconductor Sector, Motorola Ltd. For services to Export.
- Leslie William Donald Waldron, Senior Principal, Ministry of Defence.
- Richard Maurice Warburton, Director-General, Royal Society for the Prevention of Accidents.
- Lancelot Lionel Ware, lately Chairman, Institute of Patentees and Inventors.
- Norman Webb-Bourne, Deputy Managing Director, Navy, Army and Air Force Institutes.
- Harry Hodges Whewell, Northern and Assistant Editor, The Guardian.
- Keith Alan White, General Manager, Electronic Warfare Division, MEL.
- Nancy Sarah, Mrs White. For political service.
- Frank Genie Willox, Divisional Director of Projects, Military Aircraft Division Warton, British Aerospace plc.
- Ian Crawford Wilson, Chief Executive, Inverclyde District Council.
- Joseph Paul Winterforde-Young. For services to training and education for Youth.
- Henry Wilfred Young, Principal, Cookstown High School, County Tyrone.
- John Maclennan Young, Convenor, Caithness District Council.
- Miss Nan Youngman, Painter.
- Michael Paul Barrett, lately Cultural Attaché, H.M. Embassy, Washington.
- Madanjit Singh Bedi. For services to British commercial and community interests in Nigeria.
- Herbert Brammer. For services to agricultural development in Bangladesh
- Brian Leonard Budd. For services to the British community in Brussels.
- Louis Salvador Canessa, Director of Labour and Social Security, Gibraltar.
- Chau Cham-son, J.P. Director of Building and Lands, Hong Kong.
- Benson Obadiah Ebanks. For public services in the Cayman Islands.
- Colin John Edgerton, lately First Secretary (Commercial), H.M. Embassy, Santiago.
- Herbert Foxton. For services to British commercial interests in Saudi Arabia.
- Helen, Mrs Harquail. For services to the community in the Cayman Islands.
- Gwynne Jones, M.B.E. For services to British commercial interests in Marseilles.
- Cyril Jonsen, lately First Secretary (Commercial), H.M. Embassy, Quito.
- Derek Edwin Kipping, First Secretary (Administration), British High Commission, Nairobi.
- Ian Richard de Leschery. For services to British commercial interests in Los Angeles.
- Li Fook-hing. For services to the community in Hong Kong.
- Henry Litton, Q.C., J.P. For services to the community in Hong Kong.
- Gerald Peter Mosback, English Language Teaching Adviser (British Council), Sri Lanka.
- Geoffrey David George Murrell, H.M. Embassy, Moscow.
- David Albert Nicholas, Education Adviser, Government of The Gambia.
- William James Ronald Pincott, M.B.E., lately Chief Secretary, Turks and Caicos Islands.
- Peter Rogerson. For services to education in India.
- John McLeod Scarlett, First Secretary, H.M. Embassy, Paris.
- Charles Cho-chiu Sin. For public and community services in Hong Kong.
- John Mackenzie Tod, British Council Representative, Senegal.
- Peter Don Davis Warden, First Secretary and Consul, H.M. Embassy, Bangkok.
- Trevor Ernest Frank Williams, First Secretary (Administration), British High Commission, Canberra.
- Professor Rosie Young Tse-tse, J.P. For public and community services in Hong Kong.

==== Member of the Order of the British Empire (MBE) ====
Military Division

- Warrant Officer (Coxswain) John Reginald Allen.
- Lieutenant Commander Patrick Joseph Francis Allen, Royal Navy.
- Captain Rodney James Boswell, Royal Marines.
- Lieutenant Commander Alan Steven Brooks, Royal Navy.
- Lieutenant Commander (SCC) Derek Burdett, Royal Naval Reserve.
- Lieutenant Commander Barry Edward Collier, Royal Navy.
- Lieutenant Commander Edward Davis, R.D., Royal Naval Reserve.
- Lieutenant Commander Nicholas Henry Linton Harris, Royal Navy.
- Warrant Officer (Marine Engineering Mechanic) (M) Frank William Jones.
- Lieutenant Commander Michael John Mee, Royal Navy.
- Lieutenant Commander Daniel Anthony Murphy, Royal Navy.
- Lieutenant Commander Roderick Robertson, Royal Navy.
- Lieutenant Commander (SCC) Peter Wallace Sherwin, Royal Naval Reserve.
- Warrant Officer (Weapon Engineering Mechanic) (R) Brian Leslie Simpson.
- Lieutenant Commander John Robert Stanford, Royal Navy.
- Captain Roy Charles Bartaby, The Queen's Lancashire Regiment, Territorial Army.
- Captain Joseph Ralf Bass, The Queen's Regiment, Territorial Army.
- Major George Leonard Thomas Bishop, Royal Army Pay Corps,
- Major Sally Margaret Bishop, Women's Royal Army Corps.
- Major William James Blythe, The Royal Scots (The Royal Regiment).
- The Reverend Maurice Bolton, Chaplain to the Forces 3rd Class, Royal Army Chaplain's Department, Territorial Army.
- Acting Captain Richard Arthur Drysdale Bond, Combined Cadet Force.
- Major Alan Stuart Brown T.D., Royal Army Pay Corps, Territorial Army.
- Warrant Officer Class 1 (now Lieutenant) David Clegg, Corps of Royal Engineers.
- Major Simon Christopher Harlow Cleveland, The Royal Regiment of Fusiliers.
- The Reverend Richard John Coombs, Chaplain to the Forces 3rd Class, Royal Army Chaplain's Department.
- Major (now acting Lieutenant Colonel) John Hugh Eliot, Royal Regiment of Artillery.
- Major Roland Lithgow Goodison, Royal Army Pay Corps.
- Captain (Quartermaster) Alexander McLaughlin Grant, The Argyll and Sutherland Highlanders (Princess Louise's).
- Major Joseph Davies Griffiths-Eyton, Welsh Guards.
- Major (Quartermaster) Harold Francis Groves, Irish Guards.
- Major Peter Gordon Harrington, T.D., The Queen's Regiment, Territorial Army.
- Major Rodney Lovell Neal Harrison, Royal Tank Regiment.
- The Reverend Alistair John Heagerty, Chaplain to the Forces 3rd Class (now Chaplain to the Forces 2nd Class), Royal Army Chaplain's Department.
- Captain (Acting Major) Robert Graham Heslop, The Parachute Regiment.
- Major David Henry Hills, The Royal Highland Fusiliers (Princess Margaret's Own Glasgow and Ayrshire Regiment).
- Major Patrick Henry Edward Litton Holt, Queen's Own Highlanders (Seaforth and Camerons).
- Captain Roy Hunter, The Prince of Wales's Own Regiment of Yorkshire.
- Major (Queen's Gurkha Officer) Jaibahadur Gurung, M.V.O., 6th Queen Elizabeth's Own Gurkha Rifles.
- Warrant Officer Class 1 Ivor Derek Johnstone, Army Air Corps.
- Major Anthony Roderick John Langham, Royal Army Medical Corps.
- Major Philip Lilleyman, Corps of Royal Engineers.
- Captain (Traffic Officer) Rodney William Mansfield, Royal Corps of Signals.
- LsWarrant Officer Class 2 Gordon Clifford McKenzie, RoyaI Army Ordnance Corps.
- Captain (now Ordnance Executive Officer) Stephen Myers, Royal Army Ordnance Corps.
- Captain Reginald Leslie Stanley Philpot, Corps of Royal Engineers, Territorial Army.
- Major Anthony John Raper, Royal Corps of Signals.
- Warrant Officer Class 1 Ian William Smith, Corps of Royal Electrical and Mechanical Engineers.
- Major Jeffrey Smith, Royal Regiment of Artillery, Territorial Army.
- Warrant Officer Class 1 (now Lieutenant) Michael Smith. The Black Watch (Royal Highland Regiment).
- Major Robert Charles William Taylor, Intelligence Corps.
- Major James Henry Stewart Thompson, The Royal Irish Rangers (27th (Inniskilling) 83rd and 87th).
- Major Wade James Tovey, The Yorkshire Volunteers, Territorial Army.
- Major Jonathan Christopher Walmisley, Corps of Royal Engineers.
- Major (Quartermaster) Glyndwr Brian Watkins, The Light Infantry.
- Warrant Officer Class 1 (now Lieutenant) (Acting Captain) William Noel White, Royal Corps of Signals.
- Captain (Acting Major) John Wrangham, Special Air Service Regiment, Territorial Army.
- Warrant Officer Phillip Frank Barber, Royal Air Force Regiment.
- Squadron Leader Paul Charles Stuart Barratt, Royal Air Force.
- Squadron Leader James David Bell, Royal Air Force.
- Warrant Officer Harry Noel Bevan, Royal Air Force.
- Squadron Leader William John Bird, Royal Air Force.
- Flight Lieutenant Alexander Daniel Brown, A.F.C., Royal Air Force.
- Flight Lieutenant John Carlton, Royal Air Force Volunteer Reserve (Training).
- Squadron Leader Graham Roy Cecil Collins, Royal Air Force.
- Squadron Leader Kenneth George Davies, Royal Air Force Volunteer Reserve (Training).
- Squadron Leader Anthony Thomas Dolman, Royal Air Force.
- Flight Lieutenant Brian Forbes. Royal Air Force.
- Master Air Loadmaster John Freeland Hanrahan, Royal Air Force.
- Squadron Leader Iain Robertson Harvey, Royal Air Force.
- Warrant Officer Michael Hicks, Royal Air Force.
- Squadron Leader John Alexander Jarvis, Royal Air Force.
- Squadron Leader Raymond Edward Leach, Royal Air Force.
- Flight Lieutenant William Barrie Lee, B.E.M., Royal Air Force.
- Squadron Leader Graham Stuart Lynn, Royal Air Force.
- Squadron Leader John Stirling Mardon, Royal Air Force.
- Warrant Officer Gordon David Measures, Royal Air Force.
- Squadron Leader Andrew Neil Mitchell, Royal Air Force.
- Squadron Leader James Le Moine, Royal Air Force.
- Warrant Officer Joseph Alphonsus Morrison, Royal Air Force.
- Flight Lieutenant Michael Retallack, Royal Air Force.
- Squadron Leader Edward John Sowells, Royal Air Force.
- Warrant Officer Harry Owen Spencer. Royal Air Force.

Civil Division

- John William Hannay Abram, Joint Managing Director, John W. Hannay and Company Ltd, East Kilbride.
- Miss Shirley Margaret Abrey, Higher Executive Officer, Department of Employment.
- William James Roy Acton, Commandant, Devon and Cornwall Special Constabulary.
- Hannah Hall, Mrs Alderson. For political service.
- Anne, Mrs Alexander, Nursing Officer, Newton Stewart Hospital, Dumfries and Galloway Health Board.
- Miss Audrey Patricia Campbell Allester, lately Assistant Director of Nursing Services, Midwifery, Mid Surrey Health Authority.
- Lieutenant Commander Paris Newton Anderson, V.R.D., R.N.R. (Retd.), Vice President, Royal Naval Association.
- Stanley Robert Armsdon, Director, Aluminium Window Association.
- Margaret Edith, Mrs Atkins, lately Assistant Registrar, Hillingdon Family Practitioner Committee.
- Samuel Gordon Atkinson, Regional Housing Manager, Northern Ireland Housing Executive.
- Alan James Badby, Regional Quality Assurance Director, Warner-Lambert (UK) Ltd.
- Richard Henry Banks, Secretary, North West Regional Association of Occupational Safety Groups.
- Alan George Barrett, Higher Executive Officer, Board of Customs and Excise.
- Gilbert Peyman Bashforth, Headmaster, Beck Primary School, Sheffield.
- Leslie William Garrett Bateman, lately Secretary, Croydon, Sutton and District Spastics Society.
- Miss Doreen Jessie Bayley, Librarian, Institution of Civil Engineers.
- Miss Joan Violet Elizabeth Bennett, General Adviser, Youth and Community, Sheffield Local Education Authority.
- William Oakley Bishop, lately County Area Surveyor, North Yorkshire County Council.
- Vera Sheila, Mrs Bishton, Executive Officer, Economic and Social Research Council.
- Robert Blyth, lately Editor, The Pharmaceutical Journal.
- Miss Jean Alison Renwick Boldy, Board Member, Letchworth Garden City Liaison Group.
- James Eversley Bond, Director of Engineering, Rockwell Graphic Systems Ltd.
- Dennis Arthur Bowles, M.M., lately Scientific Officer, Severn Trent Water Authority.
- Frank Alfred Bristow, lately Lecturer II, Royal Air Force College, Cranwell.
- David Brook, Chairman Modern Maintenance Products International Ltd.
- Walter Broughton, Chairman, Spooner House Approved Hostel.
- Miss Christabelle Brown, Secretary to the Principal Clerk to the General Assembly, Church of Scotland.
- (John David Stuart) Tim Brown. For political and public service.
- Kenneth Brown. For services to Sheltered Employment.
- Marjorie Ursula Anne, Mrs Bryan. For political service.
- Zena, Mrs Bullmore, Chairman, Dacorum Hospital Action Group.
- William Singleton Butler, lately Member, Transport Users' Consultative Committee, North East England.
- Miss Annie Bertha Carter. For services to Music in Suffolk.
- Randolph Ernest Caughie, Member, Wigtown District Council.
- David Chadwick. For political and public service.
- Ronald Vincent Chick. For services to the National Association of Victims Support Schemes.
- Hazel Margaret, Mrs Chisholm. For services to the community in Worthing.
- Roy Lawrence Chorlton, Executive Officer, Department of Employment.
- Judith, Mrs Clayton, lately Chairman, British Orthoptic Society.
- John William Michael Cleeter, Administrative Officer, Ordnance Survey.
- Raymond Clemence. For services to Association Football.
- Miss Audrey Martha Collis, Secretary, Wiltshire Constabulary.
- George Cook, Higher Professional and Technology Officer, Ministry of Defence.
- Joyce Winifred, Mrs Cooper, For services to the East Barnet Citizens' Advice Bureau.
- Robert Ian Logan Cooper, Chairman, Technical Committee, Institute of Wastes Management.
- Gladys Margaret, Mrs Cowie, Higher Executive Officer, Department of Employment.
- Sister Aine Cox, Matron, St John's Hospice, Silverdale, Lancashire. For services to the hospice movement.
- Thomas Arthur Crellin. For political and public service.
- Harry Crossley, Chairman, Accrington Observer and Times.
- Louise, Mrs Crossley, President, Coventry Branch, Multiple Sclerosis Society.
- Peter Patrick Cull, lately Manager, Guided Weapons Estimating Department, Army Weapons Division, Stevenage, British Aerospace plc.
- Alfred William Curral, Superintendent, Royal Ulster Constabulary.
- Reginald Frederick Ernest Day, Senior Auditor, National Audit Office.
- Phillip James Dewick. For political service.
- Maurice Dickinson, Chief Environmental Health Officer, Trafford Metropolitan Borough Council.
- James Thomas Dingley, Senior Professional and Technology Officer, Ministry of Defence.
- Joan Mary, Mrs Dittrich, Catering Development Engineer, Energy Marketing, Merseyside and North Wales Electricity Board.
- Rashid Domingo, Managing Director Biozyme Laboratories Ltd., Gwent.
- Joseph Evi Donghi, lately Administrative Officer, Office of the Parliamentary Counsel.
- Miss Kathleen Aitken Dougall, Head Teacher, Inchview Primary School, Edinburgh.
- Desmond Hugh Douglas. For services to Table Tennis.
- Norman William Dowsett, lately Investments Officer, Kent County Council.
- Miss Helen Drew. For services to the community in Wigtown.
- George Edward Eastwood. For services to the Soldiers' Sailors' and Airmen's Families Association in Lancashire.
- Henry Ellwood, Product Manager, New Products, Farrell Bridge Ltd.
- John Henry Elworthy, Managing Director, Protocol Engineering plc. For services to Export.
- Fred Horace Maxfield Fairweather, lately Chief Clerk, Coventry County Court.
- Arnold George Field, Q.F.S.M., Secretary, West Midlands Fire Service Pensioners Association.
- Rowan James Flack, Clinical Nurse Manager, Rushden Hospital, Kettering Health Authority, Northamptonshire.
- Charles Walter Allen Foster. For services to the community in Cheltenham.
- Henry Morris Fox, lately Regional Technical Manager, Plant Protection Division, Imperial Chemical Industries plc.
- Rowland Eric France, Director, British Textile Machinery Association. For services to Export.
- Henry John Francis, Senior Executive Officer, Ministry of Defence.
- Leslie Arthur John Gardiner, Chairman of WDM Ltd.
- Maurice Alfred Gates, Proprietor, Micrometric Techniques.
- Edwin Mackley Gilbertson, Local Officer I, Department of Health and Social Security.
- Alun Islwyn Giles. For services to nursing in Wales.
- Alan Gill, Senior Executive Officer, Department of Health and Social Security.
- Miss Jean Margaret Glover, Senior Textile Conservation Officer, North West Area Museum Service.
- David Archibald Samaria Goodman, Chairman and Member, British Standards Institution Committees.
- Charles Goodwillie, Assistant Firemaster, Strathclyde Fire Brigade.
- Beatrice-Anne, Mrs Gordon. For services to agriculture in Cromarty, Ross-shire.
- Miss Joyce Marguerite Gore. For services to the Diocese of Canterbury.
- Anna Campbell, Mrs Graham, District Nurse, Fife Health Board.
- Ronald George Grant, Nursing Officer, Operating Theatre Department, North Devon District Hospital.
- Rex Griffiths, Project Manager 125, Civil Aircraft Division, Chester, British Aerospace plc.
- Reverend George Alfred Grindle. For services to the deaf in Northern Ireland.
- Miss Lilian Groves. Lecturer and College Officer, School of Education, University of Durham.
- Miss Veronica Gunn, Proprietor, Safeway Services Ltd.
- Jennifer May, Mrs Habens, Central Office Manager, Ocean Youth Club, Gosport, Hampshire.
- Miss Dorothy May Hadley. For services to the visually handicapped in Wolverhampton.
- Hans Wilhelm Haenlein, Head, Department of Architecture, South Bank Polytechnic.
- Gerald Maurice Haggett, lately Chief Forester, Forestry Commission.
- Joseph Hall-Dixon, lately Executive Officer, Department of Health and Social Security.
- William Hamilton, Training Officer, A. H. McIntosh Ltd., Kirkcaldy, Fife.
- Miss Sheila Margaret Hardcastle, Headmistress, The Abbey School, Reading.
- John Henry Hardwick, Chairman, Rubber Industry Safety Committee, Manpower Services Commission.
- William Hardy. For services to salmon fisheries.
- William Alexander Harkness, lately Superintendent, Lothian and Borders Police.
- Joan, Mrs Harries. For political and public service.
- Dorothy Kathleen, Mrs Hately, Secretary, North East Scotland Music School.
- Geoffrey Horace Hayward, Principal Inspector, Factory Inspectorate, Health and Safety Executive.
- Kenneth Ronald Frederick Hayward, lately Administration Officer, H.M. Prison, Cookham Wood.
- Oliver James Heath, Production Manager, Advanced Turbo Prop, Civil Aircraft Division, Hatfield, British Aerospace plc.
- Michael Leslie Hebblewhite, Nursing Officer, Hull Health Authority.
- Graham Burley Hemming, Valuer, Board of Inland Revenue.
- Miss Esther Ray Herberson, Collector of Taxes, Board of Inland Revenue.
- Miss Margaret Mary Hetherington. For political and public service.
- Thomas Hibbert. For services to youth in the Inner London area.
- James Kevin Hickey. For services to Amateur Boxing.
- Roger Hubert Higgs, Director, Department of General Practice Studies, School of Medicine and Dentistry, Kings College.
- Herbert Charles Hill, Member, Governing Body, National Association of Almshouses.
- Raymond Hirst, T.D., D.L., lately Deputy Administration Director, North East Area, British Coal.
- Bruce Edgar Hockin, Presenter and Journalist, Harlech Television.
- Margaret Nora, Mrs Hoggarth, Senior Rural Officer, Council for Voluntary Services, Cleveland.
- Geoffrey William Victor Hogger, Local Officer I, Department of Health and Social Security.
- Miss Nora Eileen Horrigan, Head of ReligiousStudies, Hardley Secondary School, Southampton.
- George Edward Hubbard, Chairman, Wakefield and District Disabled Committee.
- Royston Reginald John Huckins, Chief Welfare Officer, Ministry of Agriculture, Fisheries and Food.
- Miss Joan Alice Hughes, lately Typing Manager, Welsh Office.
- John Hughes. For services to agriculture and conservation.
- Betty, Mrs Jackson, Director, Betty Jackson Ltd.
- Robert John James, Manager, Sensors and Radar Department, Marconi Command and Control Systems Ltd.
- William Isaac James, Works Director, IMI Titanium Ltd, Swansea.
- Dorothy Eleanor Madeleine, Mrs Jameson. For services to St Oswald's Hospice, Newcastle upon Tyne.
- Miss Marie Gertrude Jamison, Staff Officer, Department of Agriculture, Northern Ireland.
- Sheila, Mrs Jenkins. For political and public service.
- John Noel Johnson. For public service in Suffolk.
- Delia Lillifred, Mrs Jones, Chairman, Tourism Committee, Association of District Councils.
- Judith Elizabeth, Mrs Jones, Headmistress, Addingham First School, Bradford.
- Marion, Mrs Jones, Senior Personal Secretary, Board of Inland Revenue.
- Susan, Mrs Jones. For public service in Wales.
- Agnes, Mrs Kane, Senior Enrolled Nurse, South Sefton Area Health Authority, Liverpool.
- Miss Jenny Goodwin Kemp, Fleet Personnel Welfare Officer, Cunard Steam Ship Company plc.
- Pamela Helen, Mrs Keys. For political and public service.
- Miss Olive Rosetta Killen, Headmistress, Churchfields Infants School, London Borough of Redbridge.
- Donald Lambley, Inspector, Derbyshire Constabulary.
- Robert Waddell Law, Member of Council, St Andrew's Ambulance Association.
- Francis Graham Lawrance, Deputy Managing Director, United Technologies Automotive (UK) Ltd.
- Peter Jordan Lawrence, lately Inspector, Board of Inland Revenue.
- Stuart Bonham Eddowes Legat, Chief Flying Instructor, Naval Flying Grading Flight, Airwork Ltd, Plymouth.
- Anthony Jack Leggett, Managing Director, Leggett Footwear Manufacturing Ltd.
- Joseph Henry Lewis, Employee Director and Finishing Group Operator, Strip Products Group, Port Talbot Works, British Steel Corporation.
- Maurice Colston Lewis, Chairman, Gravesend Churches Housing Association Ltd.
- William Benjamin James Llewellyn, Director of Music, Charterhouse School, Surrey. Marjorie Mellor,
- Mrs Lloyd, Secretary, Rosyth Community Council.
- Ernest William James Lockhart, D.L. For political and public service.
- Doreen Wilson, Mrs Lofthouse, Managing Director, Lofthouse of Fleetwood Ltd. For services to Export.
- Myrtle Irene, Mrs Lucas, County Organiser, Somerset Blood Transfusion Service, The British Red Cross Society.
- Mavis Bianca, Mrs Ludwick, Chief Typing Manager, Board of Inland Revenue.
- Wilfred Lunn. For political and public service.
- John Norman Charles Lyne, Senior Executive Officer, Board of Inland Revenue.
- James Ross Macdiarmid, Executive Director, William Davis Limited.
- Miss Catherine Ailsa Macintosh, Assistant Directing Officer, Hampshire County Architects.
- Flight Lieutenant Angus Kent Mackay, R.A.F. (Retd.), Chairman, No. 1264 Windermere Squadron Civilian Committee, Air Training Corps.
- Thomas Mackenzie. For services to Sport, particularly Angling, for the Disabled.
- Major Ian Addison Maclagan (Retd.), Deputy Chairman, The Scottish Veterans Residences.
- John MacFarlane Bute Macmillan, M.C., Chairman, Edinburgh Venture Enterprise Trust.
- William Cleator Madine, Chairman, National Federation of Fishermen's Organisations.
- Thomas Marsden. For political and public service.
- George Messer Martin. For political service.
- Richard Peter Martin, Production Director, Canemoor Ltd.
- Keith David Mason, Higher Executive Officer, Department of Health and Social Security.
- Miss Pamela Ann Masterman, Senior Executive Officer, Manpower Services Commission.
- Robert Aubrey Matthews. For services to Sport for the Disabled.
- Miss Christina Campbell McEwan, Senior Medical Officer in Community Medicine, Forth Valley Health Board.
- Charles McIlwrick, Inspector, Metropolitan Police.
- Robert George McLaughlin, Chief Superintendent, Royal Ulster Constabulary.
- William McMillan, Managing Director, W. and J. Knox, Kilbirnie, Ayrshire.
- Mary Edgar, Mrs McQuarrie, Organiser, Motherwell and Wishaw Citizens' Advice Bureau.
- Henry Farquharson Mellon, lately Headmaster, Cardinal Newman School and Community College.
- Janet Livingstone, Mrs Middleton. For services to the Chest, Heart and Stroke Association, Northern Ireland.
- Arthur Samuel Miles, Leader, Thamesdown Borough Council.
- Ellen Catherine, Mrs Miller, Senior Personal Secretary, H.M. Treasury.
- Thomas Leslie Miller, County Road Safety Officer, South Glamorgan.
- William Mills, Director of Administration, Freight Transport Association.
- Stanley Milton, Production Services Co-ordinator, Crombie, Aberdeen.
- Miss Dorothy Margaret Moore, Librarian, Theatre Museum Library, Victoria and Albert Museum.
- John George Moore, Senior Professional and Technology Officer, Department of the Environment.
- Adrian David Moorhouse. For services to Swimming.
- Mary, Mrs Morrell, Director of Community Nursing Services, Newcastle upon Tyne.
- Marjory Gociwin, Mrs Morris. For political and public service.
- Richard Henry Mozley, Managing Director, Richard Mozley Ltd.
- Leo John Murdock. For services to the Petroleum Industry.
- William Faichney Murray, lately Senior Associate, W. L. Gore and Associates (UK) Ltd., Dunfermline.
- Malcolm Napier, Observer Lieutenant, Group Officer, 31 Group Royal Observer Corps, Belfast.
- Arthur Naylor, Head Teacher, Balby Street Primary School, Doncaster.
- Terence James Neill, Managing Director, Insight Cartons Ltd.
- David Niven, Member, North East Fife District Council.
- Miss Mary Bernadette Nolan, lately Senior Nurse, Health Visiting, South East Thames Regional Health Authority.
- Raymond Leonard Osmont, Commander, St John Ambulance Brigade, Jersey.
- Herbert Thomas Paddison, D.F.C., Farm Manager, Headquarters Trial Ground, National Institute of Agriculture Botany.
- Miss Ruth Frances Panter, Senior Planning Officer, Historic Areas Division, Historic Buildings and Monuments Commission.
- John Frederick Parker, Divisional Commander, British Transport Police, British Railways.
- Ernest Parkinson, Chairman, National Association of Health Service Security Officers.
- Miss Phyllis Gertrude Partridge. For political and public service.
- Robina, Mrs Paterson. For political and public service.
- George Malcolm Pearce. For services to the community in Cardiff.
- John Meirion Penny, Senior Executive Officer, Department of Health and Social Security.
- Elizabeth, Mrs Philip, Owner, Archduke and Footstool Winebars.
- Alan Derek Piggott. For services to Gliding.
- Miss Jill Pirrie, Language Co-ordinator, Halesworth Middle School, Suffolk.
- James Somerville Shaw Pollock, Medical Officer, H.M. Remand Institution, Longridggend, Lanarkshire.
- Enid, Mrs Popple, Youth Officer, Cleveland County Branch, The British Red Cross Society.
- Arthur James Porter, Prison Visitor, H.M. Prison, Cardiff.
- Benjamin Pountain, Chief Superintendent, Metropolitan Police.
- Raymond Josiah Pratt. For political and public service.
- Anne, Mrs Preston, Managing Director, Richard Preston and Sons Ltd.
- Herbert Priestley. For services to the community in Oldham.
- Miss Shirley Joan Prior. For services to the Territorial Auxiliary and Volunteer Reserve Association.
- Emlyn Kinsey Pugh. For services to agriculture in Powys.
- Anna Maria, Mrs Putterill, Sister-in-Charge, Obstetric and Gynaecology Clinics, Queen Elizabeth Hospital, King's Lynn.
- Lieutenant Commander Paul Edward Raggett, R.N.R., (Retd.), R.D. For services to sea fisheries in Wales.
- Richard Charles Rainbird, Team Leader, Safety Engineering, Hertfordshire County Council.
- Maurice William Ramsay, M.C., lately Counsellor, Small Firms Service, Cambridge.
- Miss Jean Redpath. For services to Folk Singing.
- Kenneth Henry Richiardi, lately Chief Superintendent, City of London Police.
- Thomas Brian Riley, Higher Executive Officer, Department of Health and Social Security.
- Doreen Rose Florence, Mrs Rixon, Typing Manager, Department of Health and Social Security.
- Clifford Gordon Roberts, lately Secretary, Manchester Region Productivity Association.
- Ian Arthur Robinson, Detective Chief Superintendent, Strathclyde Police.
- Henry Francis Aylward Rose, Secretary and Treasurer, The Queen's College, Glasgow.
- Alistair Kenneth Ross, Lecturer in General Practice of Postgraduate Medicine, University of Keele.
- Charles Everard Cradock Royds, Manager, MENCAP Riding Fund.
- Joan, Mrs Russell, Founder Member, The Britain-Nigeria Association.
- June Millicent, Mrs Russell, Area Organiser, South East England Women's Royal Voluntary Service.
- Edward Rutledge, Force Welfare Officer, Greater Manchester Police.
- Caroline Mary, Mrs Ryder, lately Private Secretary, Prime Minister's Office. For political service.
- Margaret Audrey, Mrs Salmon, Community Midwife, Colchester.
- Clive Salt, lately Staff Officer, Board of Inland Revenue.
- Miss Betty Shelton, Overseas Catering Manager, British Caledonian Airways Ltd.
- Derek Albert Shentall, Chief Superintendent, Nottinghamshire Constabulary.
- Philip Charles Sheppy, Secretary, National Proficiency Tests Council for Agriculture and Horticulture.
- Norman Macdonald Shouls, District Controller, Solent, H.M. Coastguard, Department of Transport.
- Jozef Kazimierz Skwirzynski, lately Theoretical Studies Consultant, General Electric Company Research Ltd.
- John Brian Southern, Proprietor, Dobwalls Theme Park, Cornwall.
- Robin Easton Steel, Principal in General Practice.
- Gordon Vaughan Stephens, Senior Executive Officer, Board of Customs and Excise.
- Anthony Michael Stephenson, Higher Executive Officer, Board of Customs and Excise.
- Leslie Victor Stowe, Chief Superintendent, Metropolitan Police.
- Bernard Stradling, County Librarian, Gloucester.
- Kathleen Pansy, Mrs Straker. For services to the community in Retford, Nottinghamshire.
- Brian Douglas Barrett Street, Senior Professional and Technology Officer, Ministry of Defence.
- George Priest Sutherland, R.D., Chairman, Scottish White Fish Producers' Association.
- Thomas David Matthews Sutton. For services to Bowls.
- Leslie Robert Tavener, lately Head of Supply, Demand and Analysis, Shell Petroleum Company Ltd.
- Donald Robert Taylor, Higher Professional and Technology Officer, Ministry of Defence.
- William Arthur Taylor, lately Member, Bolsover District Council.
- Frank Teasdale, lately Managing Director, Whessoe Systems and Controls Ltd. For services to Export.
- Richard Dodds Telfer. For services to Music, particularly the Edinburgh Festival.
- Donald John Thomas. For services to the Employment of Disabled People.
- John Thompson. For services to the Royal British Legion in Blandford Forum, Dorset.
- Archibald Boyd Tunnock, Chairman and Managing Director, Thomas Tunnock Ltd. For services to Export.
- Miss Mary Susan Tupholme, Deputy General Secretary, British Amateur Athletic Board.
- Alan Tyson, Senior Commissioning Project Leader, Vickers Shipbuilding and Engineering Ltd, Vickers plc.
- Anthony Edward Samuel Wade, Managing Director, Dyke & Dryden Ltd.
- Richard Wade. For services to agriculture in County Durham.
- Ivor Stanley Wakeman, Engineering Superintendent, Product Support Spares, Smiths Industries plc.
- Janet Sheena, Mrs Walker, Chairman, Cumbernauld Branch, Scottish Society for the Mentally Handicapped.
- John Craig Wallace, Director of Parks, Belfast City Council.
- William Charles Wanstall, lately Higher Technical Officer, H.M. Stationery Office.
- Ivy Mary, Mrs Webster, President, Pre-School Playgroup Association, Wales.
- Denis Harold Wellon, Production Engineer, Birds Eye Walls Ltd.
- Joanna, Mrs Wheatcroft. For political and public service.
- William Nigel George Lansbury Whiskin, Assistant Director, National Association for the Care and Resettlement of Offenders.
- Robert John Whitaker, Regional Emergency and Security Officer, Wessex Water Authority.
- Thomas Arthur Brian Whitaker, Senior Executive Officer, Department of Health and Social Security.
- Miss Fatima Whitbread. For services to Athletics.
- Margaret Olive, Mrs White, Secretary and Organiser, Age Concern, Margate.
- Jean, Mrs Wickens, Higher Executive Officer, Department of Trade and Industry.
- Miss Susan Joyce Wighton, Nurse, Medical Aid to Palestine.
- Kathleen Scott, Mrs Wilkie, Regional Organiser, Lothian, Women's Royal Voluntary Service.
- James Williams, Manager, Manpower Services Commission Schemes, Renfrewshire.
- John Bruce Trevor Williams. For services to the Church of England Children's Society.
- Rachel Margaret, Mrs Williams, Head Teacher, St Francis Infants School, Barry, South Glamorgan.
- Clarence Wilson, Principal Youth and Community Adviser, Rotherham Local Education Authority.
- (Elizabeth Millar) Elsie, Mrs Wilson. For services to the Scottish Spina Bifida Association.
- Stanley Charles Wood, lately Inspector, Surrey Constabulary.
- Kenneth Clifford Woodroofe, Managing Director, Mid-Hants Railway Company plc.
- Leonard James Wright. For services to the cereals industry.
- Jack Aaron Zimmer. For services to handicapped children.

Diplomatic Service and Overseas List

- Miss Eileen Ascroft, Assistant Information Officer, H.M. Embassy, Madrid.
- Doreen Jean, Mrs Beattie. For educational services to the British community in Lagos.
- Ian William Breingan. For services to development in Zambia.
- Emily Martha, Mrs Busch-Reuschell, lately Vice-Consul, British Consulate-General, Hamburg.
- Miss Pamela Cynthia Anne Butterworth, Personal Secretary, H.M. Embassy, Washington.
- Tommy Kimmin Choy, C.P.M., Assistant Director of Municipal Services, Hong Kong.
- Chui Kwong, Chief Scientific Assistant, Royal Observatory, Hong Kong.
- William Clare, District Commissioner, Turks and Caicos Islands.
- Miss Molly Clark. For welfare services to lepers in Bhutan.
- Reinaldo Maria Cordeiro. For services to broadcasting in Hong Kong.
- Patricia Jennifer, Mrs Crosse. For welfare services to handicapped children in Bahrain.
- Miss Michaela Florence Cullen, lately Personal Assistant to H.M. Ambassador, Cairo.
- Miss Muriel Gertrude Dawson, Personal Assistant to H.M. Ambassador, Belgrade.
- Emily Veronica, Mrs Dilbert, Assistant Financial Secretary, Cayman Islands.
- John William Donald, lately Third Secretary, H.M. Embassy, Prague.
- Hugh Dunnachie, Head of British Interests Section, Italian Embassy, Tripoli.
- Alastair Marshall Eadie. For services to the British community in Jordan.
- Ann Winifred, Mrs Goulden. For welfare services to orphan children in Peru.
- Kathleen May, Mrs Guimaraens. For services to the British community in Oporto.
- Benjamin George Hopper, lately Leprosy Adviser, Ministry of Health, Lagos.
- Margaret Laurette, Mrs Hubens, Commercial Officer, British Consulate-General, Johannesburg.
- Harry Augustus Jones. For welfare services to children in New Delhi.
- James Kung. For services to the community in Hong Kong.
- Dr Judith Mary Longstaff Mackay. For services to health education in Hong Kong.
- Alan Christie Marshall, lately Second Secretary (Consular), British High Commission, Colombo.
- Peter James Morris, lately Second Secretary (Administration), British Deputy High Commission, Bombay.
- James Norman Neil Murray, B.E.M., lately Liaison Officer, H.Q. British Forces, Cyprus.
- Miss Audrey Florence Page, lately Television News Producer, United Nations, New York.
- Pang Ching-kong, Controller of Posts, Post Office, Hong Kong.
- Una, Mrs Payton, lately Consular Assistant, British Interests Section, Italian Embassy, Tripoli.
- Christopher James Poole, lately Second Secretary (Administration), H.M. Embassy, Beirut.
- Joshua Joseph Smith, Director, Social Security Board, British Virgin Islands.
- Sheila Mary, Mrs Stilwell. For welfare services to handicapped children in Portugal.
- Maurice Eugene Terceira. For services to the community in Bermuda.
- Inez Vivian, Mrs Turnbull, Education Officer, British Virgin Islands.
- Anthony Charles Arnold Wallis, Honorary British Vice-Consul, Montreux.
- Anthony Guy Wingate, Commercial Officer, H.M. Embassy, Brussels.
- Rosalie Narlini, Mrs Youngs, Assistant Representative British Council, Zimbabwe.

=== Companion of Honour (CH) ===
- George Humphrey Wolferstan Rylands, C.B.E. For services to the Arts.
- Sir Peter Markham Scott, C.B.E., D.S.C. For services to conservation.

=== Imperial Service Order (ISO) ===
- Graham Leslie Batchelor, Principal Scientific Officer, Ministry of Defence.
- Stephen James Blackwell, Principal, Ministry of Agriculture, Fisheries and Food.
- Gradon Burgoyne Carter, Principal Scientific Officer, Ministry of Defence.
- Graham Christopher, lately Grade 6, Department of the Environment.
- Frank Cochrane, Grade 6, Department of Trade and Industry.
- Ronald William George Fletcher, Inspector, Board of Inland Revenue.
- Stanley Joseph Charles Goldsmith, lately Principal Professional and Technology Officer, Ministry of Defence.
- Cyril Arthur Green, Courts Administrator, Birmingham County Court.
- Harold Leslie Hall, Grade 7, Advisory, Conciliation and Arbitration Service.
- Ronald Hargreaves, Principal, Department of Transport.
- Austin Albert Holton, Deputy Chief Inspector, Immigration Service, Home Office.
- Evan Ivor Jones, Principal Professional and Technology Officer, Ministry of Defence.
- Miss Joan Veronica Kilburn, Grade 7, Ministry of Agriculture, Fisheries and Food.
- Cyril Henry Legg, Senior Principal, Ministry of Defence.
- David Nanchollas Luscombe, First Class Valuer, Board of Inland Revenue.
- Bertram Kenneth John Marren, lately Inspector, Board of Inland Revenue.
- Miss Iris Elmslie Rankine, Principal Manager, Glasgow (City) Integrated Local Office, Department of Health and Social Security.
- Leonard Arthur Richards, Grade 7, Laboratory of the Government Chemist.
- Alan Morton Robson, Senior Principal, Department of Health and Social Security.
- Robert Wills, Inspector, Board of Inland Revenue.
- John Brierley Woods, Inspector, Social Services Inspectorate, Department of Health and Social Security.
- Gordon Penrhyn Blenkinsop, J.P., Commissioner of Rating and Valuation, Hong Kong.
- Robert Baillie Hanna, J.P., Principal Government Engineer, New Territories Development Department, Hong Kong.
- Kuo Ketchen Stephen, J.P., Assistant Director of Immigration, Hong Kong.
- Anthony Noel Savage, J.P., Principal Assistant Financial Secretary, Hong Kong.
- Wong Kwok-choy, J.P., Principal Government Engineer, Civil Engineering Services Department, Hong Kong.

=== British Empire Medal ===
Military Division

- Chief Petty Officer Cook Alan Stewart Alvey.
- Chief Petty Officer Weapon Engineering Artificer (WD) Trevor John Atkins.
- Chief Petty Officer (Ops)(R) David Bridden.
- Chief Air Engineering Mechanic (R) Stephen Carl Chester.
- Chief Communications Yeoman James Harris Cookson, Royal Naval Reserve.
- Chief Wren Writer (G) Joan Patricia Crook.
- Master at Arms David Royston Dyer.
- Chief Radio Supervisor Alan Fox.
- Chief Petty Officer Writer George Henry Foxall, Royal Naval Reserve.
- Colour Sergeant Daniel Brian Gray, Royal Marines.
- Petty Officer (AH) Martin Stanley Leonard Harvey
- Chief Marine Engineering Mechanic (M) Michael Frederick Hawkins.
- Acting Chief Wren (Plot) Patricia Florence Howes, Women's Royal Naval Reserve.
- Chief Petty Officer (CAS) Brian Robert Jay.
- Chief Air Engineering Mechanic (M) John Dennis Fraser Paterson.
- Colour Sergeant Keith Brian Pittock, Royal Marines.
- Chief Petty Officer Weapon Engineering Artificer (OC) Ronald Richard Sydney Stott.
- Chief Petty Officer Writer Kenneth Taylor.
- Colour Sergeant Philip Wakeman, Royal Marines.
- Master at Arms Wilfred John Westlake.
- Sergeant Raymond James Agnew, The Royal Irish Rangers (27th (Inniskilling), 83rd and 87th) (now discharged).
- Sergeant (now Staff Sergeant) Edward Bennett, 4th/7th Royal Dragoon Guards.
- Lance Corporal (Acting (now substantive) Lance Sergeant) Mark Leslie Briggs, Coldstream Guards.
- Staff Sergeant (now Lieutenant, Royal Army Medical Corps) David Paul Brown, Royal Regiment of Artillery.
- Corporal Michael Paul Brown, 4th/7th Royal Dragoon Guards.
- Staff Sergeant Adrian George Buxton, Corps of Royal Engineers.
- W/468311 Sergeant Donna Heather Carter, Women's Royal Army Corps.
- Staff Sergeant Ivan Ross Clark, Royal Army Ordnance Corps.
- Staff Sergeant Stephen Joseph Cole, Corps of Royal Engineers.
- Staff Sergeant Andrew William Collins, Corps of Royal Electrical and Mechanical Engineers.
- Corporal Kenneth George Cox, The Royal Green Jackets (now discharged).
- Staff Sergeant Jeremy Englebert D'alquen, Royal Corps of Signals.
- Corporal John Denton, Royal Corps of Transport (now discharged).
- Staff Sergeant (Acting Warrant Officer Class 2) Robert Douglas, Royal Army Medical Corps.
- Staff Sergeant Norman Duggan, The Parachute Regiment.
- Staff Sergeant Dennis John Dundas, The Royal Regiment of Fusiliers, Territorial Army.
- Staff Sergeant George Edward Donald Evans, Corps of Royal Electrical and Mechanical Engineers.
- Sergeant Kenneth Joseph Fox, The Royal Irish Rangers (27th (Inniskilling), 83rd and 87th).
- Staff Sergeant Robert Graeme Fox, Royal Pioneer Corps.
- Staff Sergeant Lawrence Peter Gallagher, Grenadier Guards.
- Staff Sergeant Michael Patrick Gannon, Army Physical Training Corps.
- Ranger (now Acting Lance Corporal) Norman Cameron Gordon, The Royal Irish Rangers (27th (Inniskilling), 83rd and 87th), Territorial Army. (Now deceased.)
- Corporal William Charles Edward Grattidge, Royal Corps of Signals.
- Staff Sergeant Ian James, Royal Corps of Transport.
- Sergeant Robert William Jones, Intelligence Corps.
- Corporal Ronald Frank Jones, Royal Corps of Signals.
- Sergeant (Acting Staff Sergeant) Alan Anthony Joseph, The Cheshire Regiment.
- Sergeant Roy Brian John Kochanowski, Corps of Royal Electrical and Mechanical Engineers.
- Staff Sergeant Christopher James Locke, The King's Own Scottish Borderers.
- LsStaff Sergeant Brian Luke, The Light Infantry.
- W/425114 Private (Acting Sergeant) Patricia Ann Manson, Women's Royal Army Corps.
- Sergeant (Acting Staff Sergeant (now Acting Warrant Officer Class 2)) William Marks, Royal Army Pay Corps, Territorial Army.
- Sergeant Graham Alec Marsland, Corps of Royal Engineers:
- Corporal (now Acting Sergeant Military Provost Staff Corps) Thomas Martin, The Argyll and Sutherland Highlanders (Princess Louise's).
- Staff Sergeant Stephen Job Massey, Intelligence Corps.
- Staff Sergeant John Edward McNicol, Corps of Royal Electrical and Mechanical Engineers.
- Staff Sergeant (now Warrant Officer Class 2) Peter John Milmer, Corps of Royal Electrical and Mechanical Engineers.
- Staff Sergeant Frederick Thomas Morris, Royal Corps of Signals.
- Sergeant Graham Henry Pollard, Royal Corps of Signals.
- Sergeant (now Acting Staff Sergeant) Charles John Robinson, Corps of Royal Engineers.
- Staff Sergeant Trevor John Rowles, Royal Army Ordnance Corps.
- Staff Sergeant Frank Salt, Royal Regiment of Artillery.
- Staff Sergeant Susan Ann Sansom, Women's Royal Army Corps, Territorial Army.
- Sergeant Lawrence Skuse, The Royal Regiment of Wales.
- Bombardier Gordon Michael Siddell, Royal Regiment of Artillery.
- Staff Sergeant Siva Limbu, 7th Duke of Edinburgh's Own Gurkha Rifles.
- Corporal Peter James Smith, The Gloucestershire Regiment.
- Staff Sergeant Owen James Smorthit, Army Physical Training Corps.
- Sergeant Alexander Grant Sneddon, Corps of Royal Electrical and Mechanical Engineers.
- Staff Sergeant Geoffrey Edward Leyden Stewart, Corps of Royal Electrical and Mechanical Engineers.
- Staff Sergeant Brian Keith Thomas, Royal Corps of Transport.
- Sergeant Wayne Gale Thomas, 1st The Queen's Dragoon Guards.
- Corporal Michael Terrence Thompson, Royal Corps of Signals.
- Staff Sergeant Neil Francis Thorpe, Royal Corps of Transport.
- Corporal (Acting Sergeant) Gordon Andrew Turnbull, The Black Watch (Royal Highland Regiment).
- Sergeant Ferris Walker, The Royal Scots Dragoon Guards (Carabiniers and Greys).
- Staff Sergeant Ian Grant Walsh, Army Air Corps.
- Warrant Officer Class 2 Timothy Charles Harvey Warren, Intelligence Corps.
- Sergeant John Watson, Royal Corps of Transport.
- Staff Sergeant Christopher Whewell, The Royal Irish Rangers (27th (Inniskilling), 83rd and 87th).
- Staff Sergeant (Acting (now substantive) Warrant Officer Class 2) Harold John Whitworth, The King's Own Royal Border Regiment.
- Sergeant David Williams, 9th/12th Royal Lancers (Prince of Wales's).
- Staff Sergeant Graydon Olson Washington Williams, The Duke of Wellington's Regiment (West Riding).
- Corporal Janet Ivy Williams, Women's Royal Army Corps.
- Sergeant (now Staff Sergeant) John Wykes, Army Catering Corps.
- Flight Sergeant Hor Kean Boey, Royal Air Force.
- Chief Technician Victor Robert Burroughs, Royal Air Force.
- Corporal John Colquhoun, Royal Air Force.
- Sergeant Michael Cressey, Royal Air Force.
- Chief Technician Leonard Raymond Cuff, Royal Air Force.
- Sergeant Michael John Dingwall, Royal Air Force.
- Chief Technician Robert Hall, Royal Air Force
- Flight Sergeant Ernest Neil Hartley, Royal Air Force.
- Flight Sergeant Robert Arthur Hodgkinson, Royal Air Force.
- Flight Sergeant Raymond William Kennett, Royal Air Force.
- Flight Sergeant Thomas Harry McKay, Royal Air Force.
- Flight Sergeant Barrie Mason, Royal Air Force.
- Chief Technician David Andrew Masters, Royal Air Force.
- Flight Sergeant Robert Patrick Attwood Palmer, Royal Air Force.
- Flight Sergeant Brian Parker, Royal Air Force.
- Flight Sergeant David James Purvis, Royal Air Force.
- Chief Technician Kenneth Anthony Saw, Royal Air Force.
- Flight Sergeant Robin Graham Shaw, Royal Air Force.
- Flight Sergeant Graham Stuart Siggs, Royal Air Force.
- Flight Sergeant David Walker, Royal Air Force.
- Sergeant Michael Wardle, Royal Air Force.
- Flight Sergeant David West, Royal Air Force.
- Corporal Stuart Arthur Wilkie, Royal Air Force.

Civil Division
United Kingdom

- Peter John Adams, Sergeant, Metropolitan Police.
- Robert Adamson, Foreman (Debt Control), Merseyside and North Wales Electricity Board.
- Cyril Alcock, Mechanic, Plymouth Lifeboat, Royal National Lifeboat Institution.
- Peter Frederick Alexander, Senior Jig and Tool Draughtsman, British Aerospace plc.
- Kenneth Douglas Allwood, Terminal Operator, Shell International Petroleum Company Ltd.
- Joseph Alexander Anderson, Leading Railman, Eastern Region, British Railways.
- Brian Noel Owen Anness, Waterman and Lighterman, Port of London Authority.
- Geoffrey Armstrong, lately Adult Warrant Officer, 1247 (Penrith) Squadron, Air Training Corps.
- Richard Sidney Arnott, Process and General Supervisory C, Ministry of Defence.
- Frank Atkinson, Track Chargeman, Eastern Region, British Railways.
- Derek Baker, Sergeant, Derbyshire Constabulary.
- David Gleed Barden, VDU Operator, Plessey Connectors Ltd.
- Allan John Barnett, Production General Foreman, Lucas Electrical Ltd.
- Thomas Harry Barr, lately Foreman Carpenter, Rivers Division, Thames Water Authority.
- Miss Jean Mary Wadham Barwell, Centre Organiser, Maldon, Essex Branch, The British Red Cross Society.
- Edwin Benjamin, lately Senior Bridge Inspector, Lancashire County Council.
- Miss Iris Evelyn Bentley. For services to the community in Repton, Derbyshire.
- Cyril Walter Bird, Chief Observer, No. 4 Group, Colchester, Royal Observer Corps.
- Frederick Bond, Craftsman (Overhead Line) Distribution, East Midlands Electricity Board.
- George Albert Boyd, Charge Hand Propagator, Department of the Environment.
- John Brace, Head Janitor, Ninewells Hospital, Tayside Health Board.
- Simon Peter Bradbury, Chief Naval Auxiliaryman, Penzance Unit, Royal Naval Auxiliary Service.
- Miss Monica Mary Brake, lately Supervisor, Department of Pathology, Southmead Hospital, Southmead Health Authority.
- Grace Maud, Mrs Brierley, School Crossing Patrol, Metropolitan Police.
- Edward Arthur Brine. For services to agriculture and the community in Compton Chamberlayne, Wiltshire.
- John Albert Brutnall, Postal Officer, Corby Counters District, The Post Office.
- Florence Brenda Penelope, Mrs Buckingham, Emergency Services Organiser, Devon, Women's Royal Voluntary Service.
- Edward Bullman, Maintenance Engineer, Fakenham Area, British Telecom.
- Thomas Edward Burton, Constable, Royal Ulster Constabulary.
- Tom Edwin Butterworth, Sergeant, Greater Manchester Police.
- Vernon Jack Callard, lately Ministry of Defence.
- Vera Ethel, Mrs Calvin, Old People's Club Leader, Lambeth, Women's Royal Voluntary Service.
- Miss Joan Patricia Chalkley, Senior Messenger, Ministry of Defence.
- Bella Fulton, Mrs Christie. For services to the Parents and Friends Association, Stonehaven Sea Cadet Corps Unit,
- John David Church, Sergeant, Nottinghamshire Constabulary.
- Frederick Ernest Clark. For services to Ward 13, St James' Hospital, Wandsworth.
- Miss Mary Mathieson Clark, lately Manageress, Navy, Army and Air Force Institute Club, Royal Air Force Leuchars.
- Dorothy Jean, Mrs Clarke, Steward II, Ministry of Defence.
- William Clarke, lately Foreman, Budenberg Gauge Company Ltd.
- James Arthur Clements, Sergeant, Metropolitan Police.
- Neil Cliffe. For charitable services to Wythenshawe Hospital, Manchester.
- Thomas Dawson Coatswith, Fitter, NEI Electronics Ltd. For services to Export.
- Charles Frederick Cockburn, Detective Sergeant, British Transport Police, British Railways.
- Douglas Ian Cooper, Distillery Manager, Whyte and Mackay Distillers Ltd.
- Alan Albert Copestake, Yeoman Gaoler, H.M. Tower of London.
- Francis Cornelio, Process and General Supervisory D, Ministry of Defence.
- Christopher Anthony Corrigan. For services to the Liverpool Branch, Irish Guards Association.
- Kenneth Roy Cowdery, Foundry Pattern Maker, Glynwed Foundries.
- Arthur Cowie, Coastguard Officer 1, Banff, H.M. Coastguard, Department of Transport.
- Mary Ada, Mrs Croft, Salford Metropolitan Member, Women's Royal Voluntary Service.
- Harry Cutting, Refinery Team Leader, Bibby Edible Oils Ltd.
- Keith Jones Dallimore, Graphics Officer 4, Ministry of Defence.
- John Raymond Davies. For services to the Scout Association in Gwent.
- Thomas Edwin Davies. For services to the National Council, Royal Naval Association.
- Henry John Davis, Service Technician, North Thames Region, British Gas plc.
- John Herbert Day, Foreign and Commonwealth Office.
- John Drever, Foreman Mason, Orkney Islands Squad, Historic Buildings and Monuments Directorate, Scottish Development Department.
- Harold Drury, Plant Attendant, H.M. Detention Centre, Gringley.
- Robert Hugh Dundas, Supervisor, Forestry Service, Department of Agriculture, Northern Ireland.
- Winifred Ruth, Mrs Durrant. For services to the Worcestershire Area and Worcester City Division, Soldiers' Sailors' and Airmen's Families Association.
- Audrey Ella, Mrs Edwards, Control Officer I, London Fire and Civil Defence Authority.
- William John Edwards, Chief Officer I (Works). H.M. Prison Stafford.
- Douglas George Eley, Clerk of Works, Cotehele Estate, Cornwall, The National Trust.
- Bryan Elias, lately Colliery Training Officer, Cynheidre Colliery, South Wales Area, British Coal.
- Hilda, Mrs Ellis. For services to the Pilgrim Hospital, Boston, Lincolnshire.
- Barry Walter Endean, Constable, Devon and Cornwall Constabulary.
- Kenneth John Evans, Surveyor Senior Grade, Ordnance Survey.
- Thomas Jackson Ewart, Constable, Dumfries and Galloway Constabulary.
- Norman Charles Farrell, Constable, Merseyside Police.
- Joan, Mrs Feltham. For services to the London Federation of Boys' Clubs.
- Lambert Charles Ford, Transport Officer, Hampshire Branch, The British Red Cross Society.
- William Reginald Foulger, lately Chargehand Driver, Ministry of Defence.
- Eva May, Mrs Garland, lately Senior Supervisor, Frederick Theak and Company Ltd. For services to Export.
- Frank William Gillett, Senior Caretaker, Mascalls School, Paddock Wood, Kent.
- Verdi Godwin, Inspector, Southport and Ainsdale Beaches, Sefton Metropolitan Borough Council.
- George Alexander Loggie Gray, Sewage Works Operative, Grampian Regional Council.
- Miss Muriel Edna Kitty Gregory, Senior Traffic Warden, Thames Valley Police.
- Ivy, Mrs Grieve. For services to the Parents and Friends Association, Wallsend Sea Cadet Corps Unit.
- Leonard Robert Long Groom, Special Constable, Lothian and Borders Police.
- John Martin Haigh, Works Superintendent, Thomas Broadbent and Sons Ltd.
- Albert Hallam, Departmental Foreman, Richardson Sheffield Ltd. For services to Export.
- Miss Ruth Halliday, Chargehand Net Finishing, Great Grimsby Coal Salt and Tanning Company Ltd. For services to Export.
- Patricia Elizabeth, Mrs Hannam. For services to the Children's Ward of the Central Middlesex Hospital.
- Miss Felicite Frances Hardcastle. For services to the community in Burley, Hampshire.
- Charles Frederick Hardy, lately Engineering Inspector, Hampshire Bus Company Ltd.
- Olive Ellis Mary, Mrs Harris, St Sampson Club Leader, Guernsey, Women's Royal Voluntary Service.
- Albert Harrison, Assistant Highways Superintendent, West Lancashire District Council.
- George Kenneth Harrison, lately Chief Officer Class I, Glenochil Young Offenders' Institution, Scottish Home and Health Department.
- William Robert McDonald Harrison, Sergeant, Royal Ulster Constabulary.
- Frederick William Hemenway, Observer, No. 20 Group, York, Royal Observer Corps.
- Arthur Sidney Hobbs. For services to the Wiltshire Association of Boys' and Youth Clubs.
- Charles Maxwell Hosford, Chief Bookseller, H.M. Stationery Office.
- Daphne Anne, Mrs Hulme, Telephonist, Vale Royal District Council.
- Richard James, Liaison Officer, British Equestrian Federation.
- June, Mrs Jay, Section Officer, Lincolnshire Special Constabulary.
- John Richard Gwyn Jenkins, Station Officer, Dyfed Fire Service.
- Arthur Sidney Jewell, Supervising Instructional Officer Grade 1, Ministry of Defence.
- Patrick William Johnson, Sergeant, West Yorkshire Police.
- Ernest Jones, Postal Executive 'D', Birmingham Letter Office, The Post Office.
- Harry Willis Jones, Technical Grade I, Ministry of Defence.
- Jack Jones, lately Professional and Technology Officer, Ministry of Defence.
- Olwen, Mrs Jones. For services to the deaf and hard of hearing in Wales.
- Thomas Eric Jones, Driver and Lodge Keeper, Cadbury Ltd.
- Mary Millicent, Mrs Kavanagh, Cleaner, Department of Health and Social Security.
- Anthony Keefe, Constable, Surrey Constabulary.
- Miss Ruth Margery Kelly, Chief Laboratory Scientific Officer, Exeter District Health Authority.
- Georgina Allen, Mrs King, District Food Organiser, Maidenhead, Women's Royal Voluntary Service.
- Robert William King, Electrician, Ministry of Defence.
- John Kitchener, Machine Driver, Thoresby Colliery, Nottinghamshire Area, British Coal.
- James Harold Kneale, Mechanic, The Ramsey (Isle of Man) Lifeboat, Royal National Lifeboat Institution.
- Percy John Victor Knott, lately Professional and Technology Officer, Ministry of Defence.
- Ruby Winifred, Mrs Lailey, Car Driver, Hampshire Ambulance Service.
- James Wilson Laird, Railway Shopman, Scottish Region, British Railways.
- Henry John Lake, District Staff Officer Grade III, St John Ambulance Brigade, London.
- James David Ephraim Lane, Station Warden, Ministry of Defence.
- Lau Kan Pui, Laundryman and Tailor, H.M. Ships.
- Joseph Lavery, Class II Operator, Department of the Environment.
- Donald John Lee, Driver, Western Region, British Railways.
- Richard Onyx Light, Sergeant, Staffordshire Police.
- Charles Patrick Moore Lindsay, Foreman Painter, Department of the Environment.
- Leslie Lockwood, Foreman, Steel Department, Richards (Shipbuilders) Ltd.
- Bernard John Loft, Senior Professional Driver, Southern Region, British Gas plc.
- Frederic Arthur Lund. For services to the Greater Manchester Probation Service.
- Arthur David Lusty, Constable, Royal Ulster Constabulary.
- John Macaskill, Supervisor, Scottish Region, British Railways.
- William McCone, Chief Officer I, Northern Ireland Prison Service.
- John Steel McCracken, First Aid Training Officer, British Gas plc.
- James McDowell, lately Retained Sub-Officer, Fire Authority for Northern Ireland.
- James McGill, Constable, Gwent Constabulary.
- Peter Macgregor, Courier Driver, Southern Electricity Board.
- John Maclean Mackenzie, Pipe Major, Ministry of Defence.
- Donald John Mackinnon, Boatswain, NLV Pharos, Northern Lighthouse Board.
- Evan MacRae. For services to piping.
- Frederick Ernest Victor Mansfield, Maintenance Craftsman I, North Thames Region, British Gas plc.
- Dennis Arthur Mark, Senior Technician, Slade School of Fine Art, University College London.
- Kenneth James Martin, Fleet Engineer, Fylde Borough Transport Ltd.
- Miss Doreen Peggy Joy Mascall, Senior Fire Control Operator, Essex Fire Brigade.
- Savo Masic, Caterer, Yorkshire Regional Health Authority Headquarters.
- Ronald William Mew, Service Technician, Southern Region, British Gas plc.
- Albert John Miles, Regimental Sergeant Major Instructor, Surrey Army Cadet Force.
- Mary Catherine, Mrs Millar, Member, Local Review Committee, H.M. Prison, Perth.
- William Thomas Morris, Shipping Clerk, Hull Docks, Associated British Ports.
- Derrick Charles Frederick Morrissey, Clerk of Works, Hereford and Worcester County Council.
- Ernest Rupert Murphy, lately Professional and Technology Officer, Ministry of Defence.
- Ernest Murray, Mortuary Technician, Queen's University of Belfast.
- William John Mutch, Chief Officer I (Works), H.M. Prison Liverpool.
- David Robert Nash, Erection Supervisor, Guildway.
- Richard John Nash. For services to brass band music in Wales.
- Graham Henry George Neal, Driving Instructor, Badgerline Ltd.
- Kenneth Edward Norris, Contracting Foreman, South Eastern Electricity Board.
- Joan, Mrs Nutkins, Supervisor of Government Telephonists, Ministry of Defence.
- Christopher Joseph O'Connell, Warrant Officer I, School Staff Instructor, Brighton College, Combined Cadet Force.
- Constance, Mrs O'Haire, Foster Parent, Northern Health and Social Services Board, Northern Ireland.
- Rodger Joseph O'Kane, Foreman, Roads Service,
- Department of the Environment, Northern Ireland.
- George Henry Oliver, Coal Delivery Man, Western Fuel Company.
- Joseph Padgett, Driver, Eastern Region, British Railways.
- Gerald Dorrien Palmby, County Secretary, Kent Branch, The Royal British Legion.
- Raymond James Parker, Research and Development Craftsman, Ministry of Defence.
- George Parkhill, Organist and Choirmaster, Old Gourock Church, Inverclyde.
- Maurice Parkin, Caretaker, North Axholme School, Crowle, South Humberside.
- John Thomas Peckover, Constable, West Midlands Police.
- Laura, Mrs Pendleton, Divisional Superintendent, West Yorkshire, St John Ambulance Brigade.
- Bruce Perry, Constable, Metropolitan Police.
- George Porter, Shepherd, Glen Farm, Gatehouse-of-Fleet, Kirkcudbright.
- William George Porter, Slitter, Whitehead Works, BSC Strip Products Group.
- Eric Drummond Potts, Chargehand Non-Craft Industrial, Dounreay, United Kingdom Atomic Energy Authority.
- Edith Nora, Mrs Rastall, Foster Parent, Lincolnshire Social Services Department.
- Robert Read, District Technical Officer, North Thames Region, British Gas plc.
- Claude Robert Adrian Reilly, Professional and Technology Officer, Commonwealth War Graves Commission.
- Geoffrey William Richardson, Senior Inspector, Anglian Water Authority.
- Betty Marguerite, Mrs Riches, Divisional Officer, Norfolk Ambulance Service.
- Edward Robb. For services to the community in Huyton, Merseyside.
- Michael Roberts. For services to the Crewe Branch, the Spastics Society.
- Rodney David Roberts, Officer, H.M. Prison Bristol.
- Henry Robinson. For services to Morpeth Cottage Hospital, Northumberland.
- Grace Darroch, Mrs Rodger, lately Supervising Telephonist, National Engineering Laboratory, Department of Trade and Industry.
- Violet Gladys, Mrs Rolls, lately Personal Assistant and Secretary to the Director of the Contractors' Association.
- Mary, Mrs Ross. For services to the community in Tomatin, Inverness-shire.
- William Rowe, Constable, Northumbria Police.
- Cyril Victor Ruff, Research and Development Engineer, Reynolds Boughton Ltd.
- John Albert Corbett Rugg, Apprenticeship Assistant, Agricultural Training Board. For services to Agriculture and training.
- Reginald Sansom, Leading Hand Monotype Caster Operator (printing), Metropolitan Police.
- Alfred Reginald Segasby, Caretaker, Corby Centre, Territorial Auxiliary and Volunteer Reserve Association.
- John Seymour, Sub Officer, Wheathampstead Station, Hertfordshire Fire Brigade.
- Roy Shears, lately Professional and Technology Officer, Ministry of Defence.
- Alan Slade, Shift Charge Engineer, Littleton Colliery, Western Area, British Coal.
- Edna, Mrs Smith, Principal, Redbridge Association for Handicapped People.
- Lionel John Smith, lately Parks Supervisor, Brentwood District Council.
- Mary Lovie, Mrs Snape. For services to the community in Balloch, Inverness-shire.
- Derek Edwin Springell, Bosun, Peninsular and Oriental European Transport Services.
- William John Stewart, Sergeant, Royal Ulster Constabulary.
- Ralph Sutton, Chef, Cheshire Constabulary.
- Frank Elliott Swann, Senior Ranger, Cheshire County Council.
- Dennis Albert Taw, Chief Paperkeeper, Patent Office.
- Elspeth Janet Campbell, Mrs Thomas. For services to the community in Kelsall, Cheshire.
- Tom William Thomas, Workshop Foreman, RMC Group plc.
- Charles Cowan Thomason, Auxiliary Coastguard in Charge, Fetlar Company, Shetland.
- Edna Mary, Mrs Townend, Nursing Auxiliary, the Princess Royal Hospital, Hull District Health Authority.
- Arthur Albert Tucker, lately Foreman, Remploy Packaging and Assembly Factory.
- Ruth, Mrs Tweedie. For services to the community in North Berwick.
- William Francis Tyzack. For services to the London Taxi Drivers' Fund for underprivileged children.
- David Edward Alec Vokins, Constable, Ministry of Defence Police.
- George Murdoch Watt. For services to the community in Strontian, Argyll.
- John Frederick West, Driver, Shell International Petroleum Company Ltd.
- Alexander Wilkinson, Senior Museum Assistant, Ulster Folk and Transport Museum.
- Elliw May, Mrs Williams. For services to mentally handicapped children in Clwyd.
- Miss Ada Marion Willis. For services to the community in Blyth, Northumberland.
- Janet Coupland, Mrs Wilson, Branch Records Officer, Scottish Branch, British Red Cross Society.
- Sarah Ann, Mrs Winkle. For services to the community in Biddulph, Staffordshire.
- Henry Wookey, lately Depot Superintendent, British Waterways Board.
- Robert Young, Telecommunications Technician, Scottish Region, British Railways.
- Ernest Hammond Youngson, Janitor, Airyhall Primary School, Aberdeen.
- Edwin Zaremba, Construction Engineer, Antenna Systems Division, Marconi Communication Systems Ltd. For services to Export.

Overseas Territories

- Alice Consuelo, Mrs Anderson, Meteorological Observer, Weather Bureau, Cayman Islands.
- George Chan Kee-yeung, Telephone Operator, Posts and Telegraph Department, Hong Kong.
- Chan Tze-kong, Amenities Officer I, Urban Services Department, Hong Kong.
- Chau Tin-kwai, Senior Amenities Assistant, Urban Services Department, Hong Kong.
- Mario Finlayson, Art Teacher, Education Department, Gibraltar.
- Beverley, Mrs Hennings, Officer-in-Charge, Passport Section, Cayman Islands.
- Hui Man-kam, Chief Customs Officer, Customs and Excise Services, Hong Kong.
- Li Yuen-ting, Senior Transport Officer, Transport Department, Hong Kong.
- Julian Edward Maduro, lately Building Supervisor, Public Works Department, British Virgin Islands.
- Rosamund Agatha, Mrs Maduro, Cook, Department of Health, British Virgin Islands.
- Wong Hoo-ying, Supervisor Grade Siii, Civil Aid Services, Hong Kong.

=== Royal Red Cross ===
==== Member of the Royal Red Cross (RRC) ====
- Lieutenant Colonel Helen Hinds, Queen Alexandra's Royal Army Nursing Corps, Territorial Army.

==== Associate of the Royal Red Cross (ARRC) ====
- Superintending Nursing Officer Christine Mary Poole, Queen Alexandra's Royal Naval Nursing Service.
- Major Patricia Ann Gilson, Queen Alexandra's Royal Army Nursing Corps, Territorial Army.
- Major Majorie Ann Quickfall, Queen Alexandra's Royal Army Nursing Corps.
- Major Esme Pauline Reynolds, Queen Alexandra's Royal Army Nursing Corps.
- Flight Lieutenant Carma Ann Beckwith, Princess Mary's Royal Air Force Nursing Service.
- Corporal Laurence Paul Shepherd, Royal Air Force.

=== Air Force Cross (AFC) ===
- Captain Paul Stuart Belding, Royal Marines.
- Squadron Leader Philip Desmond Dye, Royal Air Force.
- Wing Commander Richard Skene Peacock-Edwards, Royal Air Force.
- Squadron Leader George William Pixton, Royal Air Force.

=== Air Force Medal (AFM) ===
- Staff Sergeant Francis Walker, Army Air Corps.

=== Queen's Police Medal for Distinguished Service (QPM) ===
England and Wales

- John Maurice Allain, Commander Metropolitan Police.
- Jack Aspinall, Chief Constable, Ministry of Defence Police.
- Miss Margaret Brenda Chicken, Chief Superintendent, Humberside Police.
- David Harry Clarkson, Superintendent, West Yorkshire Police.
- Matthew Dick Comrie, Assistant Chief Constable, Essex Police.
- Simon Robert Aitken Crawshaw, Deputy Assistant Commissioner, Metropolitan Police.
- Ronald Curry, Constable, Northumbria Police.
- Robert James Goslin, Deputy Chief Constable, Cambridgeshire Constabulary.
- Donald Ian Grieve, Chief Superintendent, Mersey side Police.
- Peter Michael Holman, Detective Sergeant, Metropolitan Police.
- Bryan Harry Jones, Chief Inspector, West Midlands Police.
- Graham Wyn Jones, Deputy Assistant Commissioner, Metropolitan Police.
- Bryan Robert Meadows, Chief Superintendent, South Yorkshire Police.
- Gerard Needham, lately Superintendent, Dorset Police.
- Malcolm Robert Popperwell, Assistant Chief Constable, Avon and Somerset Constabulary.
- Ronald William Rumsby, Chief Superintendent, Suffolk Constabulary.
- Colin Roderick Smith, C.V.O., Chief Constable, Thames Valley Police.
- Richard Burton Wells, Deputy Assistant Commissioner, Metropolitan Police.

Northern Ireland

- George Campbell Jackson, Chief Superintendent, Royal Ulster Constabulary.
- William McGreeghan, Sergeant, Royal Ulster Constabulary.

Hong Kong

- Frederick Samual McCosh, C.P.M., Assistant Commissioner, Royal Hong Kong Police Force.
- Donald McFarlane Watson, C.P.M., Assistant Commissioner, Royal Hong Kong Police Force.

Scotland

- William John McKinlay Wilson, Deputy Chief Constable, Fife Constabulary.
- James Fraser Cameron, Assistant Chief Constable, Tayside Police.
- Frederick William Parsons, Chief Inspector, Strathclyde Police.

=== Queen's Fire Service Medal for Distinguished Service ===
England and Wales

- Harold Charles Cosham, Divisional Officer II, Suffolk Fire Brigade.
- Ivor Southworth, Assistant Chief Officer, Lancashire Fire Brigade.
- Michael Terrence Sullivan, Assistant Chief Officer, London Fire and Civil Defence Authority.
- David Anthony Wink, Assistant Chief Officer, Ministry of Defence (Army).

Scotland

- Alexander Winton, Firemaster, Tayside Fire Brigade.

=== Colonial Police Medal for Meritorious Service ===
- Robert Anthony Allen, Senior Superintendent, Royal Hong Kong Police Force.
- Christopher John Boswell, Senior Superintendent, Royal Hong Kong Police Force.
- Chan Kam-shuen, Principal Fireman, Hong Kong Fire Services.
- Chan Kwong, Inspector, Royal Hong Kong Police Force
- Chan Wan-ding, Senior Divisional Officer, Hong Kong Fire Services.
- Chan Yat-kwong, Station Sergeant, Royal Hong Kong Police Force.
- Cheung Chan-chung, Superintendent (Ambulance), Hong Kong Fire Services.
- Peter Wilkin Ferry, Senior Superintendent, Royal Hong Kong Police Force.
- Alexander James Forbes, Superintendent, Bermuda Police Force.
- Keung Lun-chiu, Station Sergeant, Royal Hong Kong Police Force.
- Lau Hon-hung, Station Sergeant, Royal Hong Kong Police Force.
- Li Ming, Sergeant, Royal Hong Kong Police Force.
- Daniel George Robinson, Senior Superintendent, Royal Hong Kong Police Force.
- Tang Hei-kwong, Sergeant, Royal Hong Kong Police Force.
- Tsang Kang-ping, Station Sergeant, Royal Hong Kong Police Force.
- Tsui Sui-cheung, Chief Inspector, Royal Hong Kong Police Force.
- Tsui Wing-kui, Principal Fireman, Hong Kong Fire Services.
- Wat Tsan-hung, Sergeant, Royal Hong Kong Police Force.
- Ronald Arthur Whitley, Superintendent, Royal Hong Kong Police Force.
- Yip Lun-cheung, Senior Divisional Officer, Hong Kong Fire Services.

=== Queen's Commendation for Valuable Service in the Air ===
- Lieutenant Commander Norman Kenneth Bennett, Royal Navy.
- Lieutenant Commander Paul Rodney Lea, Royal Navy.
- Lieutenant Commander Malcolm Robert Legg, Royal Navy.
- Chief Petty Officer Aircrewman Graham Steven Watson.
- Lieutenant Neal Peter Yates, Royal Navy.
- Warrant Officer Class 1 John Wright, Corps of Royal Electrical and Mechanical Engineers.
- Flight Lieutenant John David Aldington, Royal Air Force.
- Squadron Leader Barry Peter Doggett, Royal Air Force.
- Flight Sergeant Patrick Joseph Feeney, Royal Air Force.
- Squadron Leader Kenneth George Gowers, Royal Air Force.
- Squadron Leader Peter Michael Jewell, Royal Air Force.
- Flight Lieutenant Gordon Anthony Jones, Royal Air Force.
- Flight Lieutenant James Mardon, Royal Air Force.
- Squadron Leader Kevin Mason, Royal Air Force.
- Flight Lieutenant Paul Michael Millikin. Royal Air Force.
- Squadron Leader Bruce Monk, Royal Air Force
- Wing Commander Brian Paul Nicolle, Royal Air Force.
- Squadron Leader Jonathan William Pierce, Royal Air Force.
- Flight Lieutenant Harvey Edward Spirit, Royal Air Force.
- Flight Lieutenant Michael Anthony Benedict Kevin Wright, Royal Air Force.
- John Hall Fawcett, A.F.C., Test Pilot, Rolls-Royce Ltd.
- Harry Gee, Flight Operations Manager, Brymon Airways.

== Australia ==
=== Knight Bachelor ===
- Carl Henry Holm, O.B.E. For services to the community.

=== Order of the British Empire ===
==== Commander of the Order of the British Empire (CBE) ====
Civil Division

- Kevin James Driscoll, O.B.E. For services to the building industry and to the community
- Dr. Selim Abraham Mellick. For services to the medical profession and to the community.

==== Officer of the Order of the British Empire (OBE) ====
Civil Division

- Edward William Robert Howard, O.A.M. For services to the community.
- Giovanni (John) Panizza. For services to the engineering profession.
- Constantine Michael Philippides. For services to the community.
- Dr. Grantley Crohan Sheridan Stable. For services to child welfare.
- The Reverend Dr. Dudley Barrington Clarke. For services to education.

==== Member of the Order of the British Empire (MBE) ====
Civil Division

- Eileen Joan, Mrs. Battle. For services to the community.
- Harold Edward Corbould. For services to the community.
- Alan Jonathan Wesley George. For services to the metal and engineering industry.
- Dr. Ruth Molphy. For services to the medical profession.
- Frederick Martin Moule. For services to the community.
- Dr. Julian Charles Mullins. For services to the veterinary profession and to the community.
- Donald Stuart Scott. For services to the community.
- Miss Ann Elizabeth Smith. For services to the community.
- Councillor Frederick John Tritton. For services to the community.
- Harry Stafford Teesdale Smith. For services to agriculture.

Dr. Aretas William Young. For medical services.

=== British Empire Medal (BEM) ===
Civil Division

- Mary, Mrs. Bade. For services to the community.
- Mervyn Colin Bell. For services to the community.
- Pauline Lavinia (Betty), Mrs. Cavanagh. For services to the community
- Frederick George Gibson. For services to the Queensland Ambulance Transport Brigade.
- Howard Kennedy. For services to the community.
- Alice Grace, Mrs. Longwill. For services to the community.
- Keith Thomson MacDonald. For services to the community.
- James Alexander Mitchell. For services to the community.
- Madge Barbara Grace, Mrs. Moore. For services to the science of ornithology.
- Irene Mary Theresa, Mrs. Taylor. For services to the community.
- Harold Arthur Dean, R.V.M. For public service.
- Kenneth Donovan. President, Hobart Branch, The Waterside Workers' Federation.
- Dulcie, Mrs. Graham-Jones. For services to amateur tennis and to the community.
- Joan Louise, Mrs. Ikin. For services to the Girl Guide movement.

=== Queen's Police Medal (QPM) ===
- Alan Richard Walker. Assistant Commissioner of Police, Queensland Police Force.

== Barbados ==
=== Knight Bachelor ===
- John Antony Jerningham Murray, C.B.E. For services to the sugar industry.

=== Order of Saint Michael and Saint George ===
==== Companion of the Order of St Michael and St George (CMG) ====
- Branston Reginald Collymore, Permanent Secretary to the Prime Minister.
- The Hon. Douglas Percival Lynch, Q.C. For services to law.

=== Order of the British Empire ===
==== Commander of the Order of the British Empire (CBE) ====
Civil Division

- Wilfred McDonald Rogers, J.P. For public service.

==== Officer of the Order of the British Empire (OBE) ====
Civil Division

- Lady Gwendolyn Brancker, J.P. For services to education and to the Girl Guide movement.
- Sybil Frances, Mrs. Leacock, J.P. For voluntary social service and services to primary education.
- Charles Reginald Courtenay Springer, J.P. For public service and services to Scouting.

==== Member of the Order of the British Empire (MBE) ====
Civil Division

- Lloyd Beresford Alleyne. For services to commerce and the community.
- Leeds Ishbel, Mrs. Greaves. For public service.
- Harold Merton Sinclair Pollard, J.P. For services to the Boy Scout movement.

== Mauritius ==
=== Knight Bachelor ===
- Harry Krishnan Tirvengadum, Chairman and Managing Director, Air Mauritius.

=== Order of the British Empire ===
==== Officer of the Order of the British Empire (OBE) ====
Civil Division

- Clency Gerard Cimiotti. For services to art and culture.
- Louis Maurice Cyril Cure. For services to sport.

==== Member of the Order of the British Empire (MBE) ====
Civil Division

- Permal Mauremootoo. For services to the Co-operative movement.
- Dhunessur Ramlugan, lately Principal Inspector of Schools, Ministry of Education, Arts and Culture.

=== Queen's Police Medal (QPM) ===
- Bhimsen Kowlessur, M.P.M., Commissioner of Police.

=== Mauritius Police Medal (MPM) ===
- Abdool Cader Cassim Amode, Inspector of Police.
- Louis Auxynius Babet, Police Sergeant.
- Bharruth Bhurtun, Superintendent of Police.
- Joseph Archimede Leclair, lately Inspector of Police.
- Andre Roger Marie, Superintendent of Police.

== Fiji ==
=== Order of the British Empire ===
==== Commander of the Order of the British Empire (CBE) ====
Civil Division

- Premesh Urna Raman, Q.P .M. Commissioner, Royal Fiji Police Force.

==== Officer of the Order of the British Empire (OBE) ====
Civil Division

- Alfred Robert Stone. For services to the pharmaceutical profession and to the community.

==== Member of the Order of the British Empire (MBE) ====
Civil Division

- Dr. Manoa Baro Masi. For services to the community.
- Ratu Kinijoji Nanovo Vosailagi. For public service.

== Bahamas ==
=== Order of the British Empire ===
==== Commander of the Order of the British Empire (CBE) ====
Civil Division

- The Honourable Livingstone Nathaniel Coakley, M.P. Minister of Labour and Minister of Youth, Sport and Community Affairs.

==== Member of the Order of the British Empire (MBE) ====
Civil Division

- Lilly, Mrs. Bowleg. For services to the community.
- Ira Curry. For services to the community.
- John Henry Gay. For services to the community.
- Margaret E., Mrs. Gibbs. For services to the community.
- Ormond Hilton Poitier. Special Assistant to the Manager, Batelco.

== Grenada ==
=== Order of the British Empire ===
==== Commander of the Order of the British Empire (CBE) ====
Civil Division

- Lenox Halpin Philips, Chairman, Public Service Commission.

== Papua New Guinea ==
=== Knight Bachelor ===
- The Honourable Ronald ToVue, O.B.E., M.P.A., Premier of East New Britain Province.

=== Order of Saint Michael and Saint George ===
==== Companion of the Order of St Michael and St George (CMG) ====
- Bernard Paul Songo, O.B.E. For public service.

=== Order of the British Empire ===
==== Commander of the Order of the British Empire (CBE) ====
Civil Division

- The Honourable Mr. Justice Karibone Arnold Amet. For services to law.
- Makena Geno. For public service.
- Norman Cyril Osborn, A.M. For public and community service.

==== Officer of the Order of the British Empire (OBE) ====
Civil Division

- Karol Kisokau. For public service.
- Gordon Mamis. For services to education.
- The Honourable Kambiye Mugul, M.P.A. For public and community service.

Military Division

- Lieutenant Colonel Joseph Maras Bau (84079). For service to the Papua New Guinea Defence Force.

==== Member of the Order of the British Empire (MBE) ====
Civil Division

- Pastor Mamata Abe. For services to the Church and the blind.
- Gerea Aopi. For public service.
- Kapena Boe Arua. For services to broadcasting.
- Sergeant Major Toumo Buibui (2595). For service to the Royal Papua New Guinea Constabulary.
- Torwin Kiapsolo. For public and community service.
- Thomas Eliott Liveras. For public service.
- The Reverend Brother Peter Mayf. For services to education.
- Professor Ellen Maev O'Collins. For services to the community and education.
- Chief Superintendent Philip Taku. For service to the Royal Papua New Guinea Constabulary.
- Alois Tondave, M.P.A. For public service.

Military Division

- Warrant Officer Class I Charles Nuembui (83391). For service to the Papua New Guinea Defence Force
- Major Paul W. Pirikin (82561). For service to the Papua New Guinea Defence Force.

=== Imperial Service Order (ISO) ===
- Laurence Michael Newall. For services to law.

=== British Empire Medal (BEM) ===
Civil Division

- Barton Diritanumo. For community service.
- Mara Embon. For services to air transport.
- Bagipau Govetau. For public service.
- Iammo Gapi, Mrs. Launa. For services to sport.
- Buda Koga. For services to air transport.
- Senior Constable Vanua Konomo (2750). For services to the Royal Papua New Guinea Constabulary.
- Thomas Laubai. For public service.
- Samuel Masawang. For community service.
- Constable Bohutepa Popora (0659). For service to the Royal Papua New Guinea Constabulary.
- Joseph Ringe. For public and community service.
- Lucas Tinpis. For public service.
- Tau John Tokwepota. For service to sport.
- Kisua Wala. For services to the aviation industry.

Civil Division

- Warrant Officer John Ovia (82126). For service to the Papua New Guinea Defence Force.

=== Queen's Police Medal (QPM) ===
- Assistant Commissioner Robert Nenta. For service to the Royal Papua New Guinea Constabulary.

== Solomon Islands ==
=== Order of the British Empire ===
==== Officer of the Order of the British Empire (OBE) ====
Civil Division

- Levi Poloso. For public service.

==== Member of the Order of the British Empire (MBE) ====
Civil Division

- Robert Victory Emery. For public service.
- Daniel Ho'ota. For public and community service.

=== British Empire Medal (BEM) ===
Civil Division

- Jediael Houtaha. For public service.

== Tuvalu ==
=== Order of the British Empire ===
==== Member of the Order of the British Empire (MBE) ====
Civil Division

- Samuel Pepys Rawlins. For services to the community.

== Saint Lucia ==
=== Order of the British Empire ===
==== Commander of the Order of the British Empire (CBE) ====
Civil Division

- Charles Marie Emmanuel Cadet, O.B.E., Acting High Commissioner for the Eastern Caribbean States.

== Saint Vincent and The Grenadines ==
=== Order of the British Empire ===
==== Order of the Order of the British Empire (OBE) ====
Civil Division

- Theodore Vanragin Keane. For services in the field of education.

== Belize ==
=== Order of the British Empire ===
==== Commander of the Order of the British Empire (CBE) ====
Civil Division

- Miss Sadie Gwendolyn Vernon. Executive Secretary, Belize Council of Churches.

==== Officer of the Order of the British Empire (OBE) ====
Civil Division

- Harry Llewellyn Lawrence. For services to journalism.

==== Member of the Order of the British Empire (MBE) ====
Civil Division

- Gerald Rhaburn. For services to music and the arts.
- Nellie Gwendolyn, Mrs. Tucker. For services to education and the community.

== Antigua and Barbuda ==
=== Order of the British Empire ===
==== Officer of the Order of the British Empire (OBE) ====
Civil Division

- Dudley Keith Llewelyn Hurst, Financial Secretary.

==== Member of the Order of the British Empire (MBE) ====
Civil Division

Walter Timothy Murdoch O'Reilly. For services to music and the community.

== Saint Christopher and Nevis ==
=== Order of the British Empire ===
==== Member of the Order of the British Empire (MBE) ====
Civil Division

- Calvin Lucien Addison Wilkin. For services to the community.

=== British Empire Medal (BEM) ===
Civil Division

- Miss Louise Elaine Osborne. For services to the community.
