= Brian Humphries =

Brian Humphries may refer to:

- Brian Humphries (British businessman), former president and CEO of the European Business Aviation Association
- Brian Humphries (Irish businessman), former CEO of Cognizant
