= Robert Scholey =

British businessman in the steel industry

Sir Robert Scholey
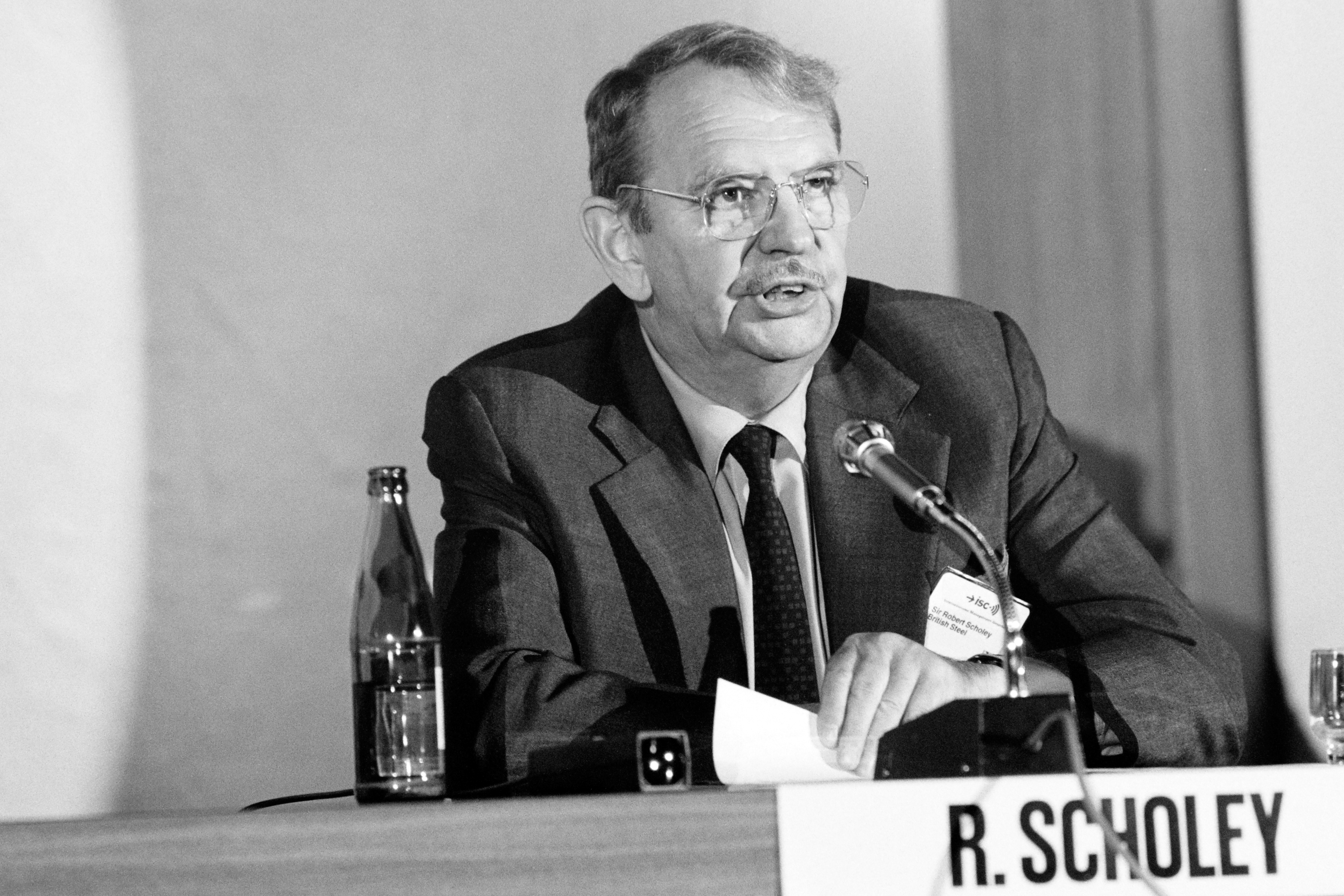
- Sir Robert Scholey in 1989
- Born: October 8, 1921; Sheffield, United Kingdom
- Died: January 12, 2014 (aged 92); Much Hadham
- Occupations: Business executive, engineer
- Known for: Chairman of British Steel from 1986 to 1992
- Spouse: Joan Methley (m. 1946)
- Children: 2

Sir Robert Scholey CBE FREng (8 October 1921 – 12 January 2014) was a British engineer and business executive who was the Chairman of British Steel from 1986 to 1992.

== Early life ==
Scholey was born in Sheffield and was educated at King Edward VII School, Sheffield. He left school aged 16 to work for Steel, Peech and Tozer, studying engineering four nights a week at Sheffield University. During World War II he served as a captain in the Royal Electrical and Mechanical Engineers.

== Career ==
In 1947 he moved to work at United Steel Companies and after nationalisation moved again to work at British Steel Corporation's head office, becoming CEO in 1973 and chairman in 1986. He retired from British Steel in 1992.

He was also on the board of Eurotunnel from 1987-1994, and chairman of the International Iron and Steel Institute for 1989-90. He also served terms as president of Eurofer, the European steel association, and in 1989 the Institute of Metals.

== Personal life and death ==
He was married to Joan Methley and had two daughters. He died in 2014 at Much Hadham, Hertfordshire.

== Recognition ==
- Made Commander of the British Empire (CBE) in the 1982 New Year Honours and knighted in the 1987 Birthday Honours.
- Awarded the Bessemer Gold Medal of the Institute of Metals in 1988.
- Elected a Fellow of the Royal Academy of Engineering in 1990.
