= David Nickson, Baron Nickson =

British businessman

The Right Honourable The Lord Nickson KBE

Member of the House of Lords
- Lord Temporal
- Life peerage 22 March 1994 – 27 March 2015

Personal details
- Born: David Wigley Nickson; 27 November 1929 (age 96)
- Party: Conservative (1994–1999); Crossbench (1999–2015)
- Education: Eton College, Royal Military Academy Sandhurst
- Alma mater: Eton College

David Wigley Nickson, Baron Nickson, KBE (born 27 November 1929) is a British businessman, a former crossbench peer and a former President of the Confederation of British Industry. He was Chairman of the Clydesdale Bank, Scottish & Newcastle, Scottish Enterprise and the Government's Senior Salaries Review Body.

== Business career ==
Nickson worked from 1954 to 1982 at William Collins Sons & Co. Ltd publishers, made director in 1961, joint managing director in 1967, vice chairman in 1976 and group managing director in 1979. He was director of Scottish United Investors from 1970 to 1983, of General Accident Fire and Life Assurance Corporation from 1971 to 1998, of the Clydesdale Bank 1981 to 1989, of Scottish & Newcastle Breweries 1981 to 1995, of Radio Clyde 1982 to 1985, of The Edinburgh Investment Trust between 1983 and 1994, of the Hambros Bank 1989 to 1998 and of the National Australia Bank from 1991 to 1996. In many companies he was also chairman or deputy chairman at any time.

== Public service ==
Nickson is a freeman of the City of London, an Honorary Freeman of the Fishmongers Company. From 1993 to 2002, he was the first chancellor of the Glasgow Caledonian University. He was Chairman of The Countryside Commission for Scotland (1983–85), Chairman of the CBI in Scotland (1979–81). President of the CBI (1986–88). Chairman of the Government's Senior Salaries Review Body (1989–95), and Chairman of Scottish Enterprise (1989–93). He was Deputy Lieutenant of Stirling and Falkirk 1982. Vice-lieutenant 1997-2005. He was Captain in the Royal Company of Archers, the Queen's Bodyguard for Scotland.

Nickson was appointed a Commander of the Order of the British Empire (CBE) in the 1981 Birthday Honours and was promoted to Knight Commander (KBE) in the 1987 Birthday Honours. He was created a life peer in the 1994 New Year's Honours and took his seat on 22 March 1994 as Baron Nickson, of Renagour in the District of Stirling. He sat as a Conservative in the House of Lords until 1999, then as a Crossbencher until he retired from the House on 27 March 2015.

== Personal life ==
Nickson was educated at Eton College, where his father was a Housemaster, then at the Royal Military Academy Sandhurst, where he became a Senior Under Office before being commissioned into the Coldstream Guards in 1949. He took part in the Trooping of the Colour Ceremony in 1950. He spent the next four years in the Middle East. His last job was Staff Captain 1st Guards Brigade before he left the Army in 1954.

A lifelong fisherman, he was Chairman of The Atlantic Salmon Trust, President of the Association of Scottish Salmon Fishery Boards, chair of the Secretary of State for Scotland's Atlantic Salmon Task Force (1997), and founder of the Cromarty Firth Fisheries Trust.

== Arms ==
Coat of arms of David Nickson, Baron Nickson
Crest A lion rampant reguardant Proper supporting a tilting spear Argent point downwards. Escutcheon Azure a cross flory Or between four bezants on a chief Argent a wolf's head erased Proper. Supporters Two salmon Proper each charged with a hurt thereon a cross flory Or. Motto Pedem Prolatum Refero Nunquam (Having Set My Foot Forward I Never Step Back)

Orders of precedence in the United Kingdom
Preceded by The Lord Tugendhat	Gentlemen; Baron Nickson	Followed by The Lord Dubs
