= Anthony Seymour Laughton =

British oceanographer (1927–2019)

Sir Anthony Seymour Laughton FRS (29 April 1927—27 September 2019) was a British oceanographer.

He was educated at Marlborough College and King's College, Cambridge. He worked for the Institute of Oceanographic Sciences (now the National Oceanography Centre) and served as director in 1978. He was elected Fellow of the Royal Society in 1980 and received a knighthood for services to oceanography in the 1987 Birthday Honours.He was awarded the Murchison Medal of the Geological Society of London in 1989.
