= Shell Aircraft =

Corporate airline of Shell plc

Shell Aircraft International
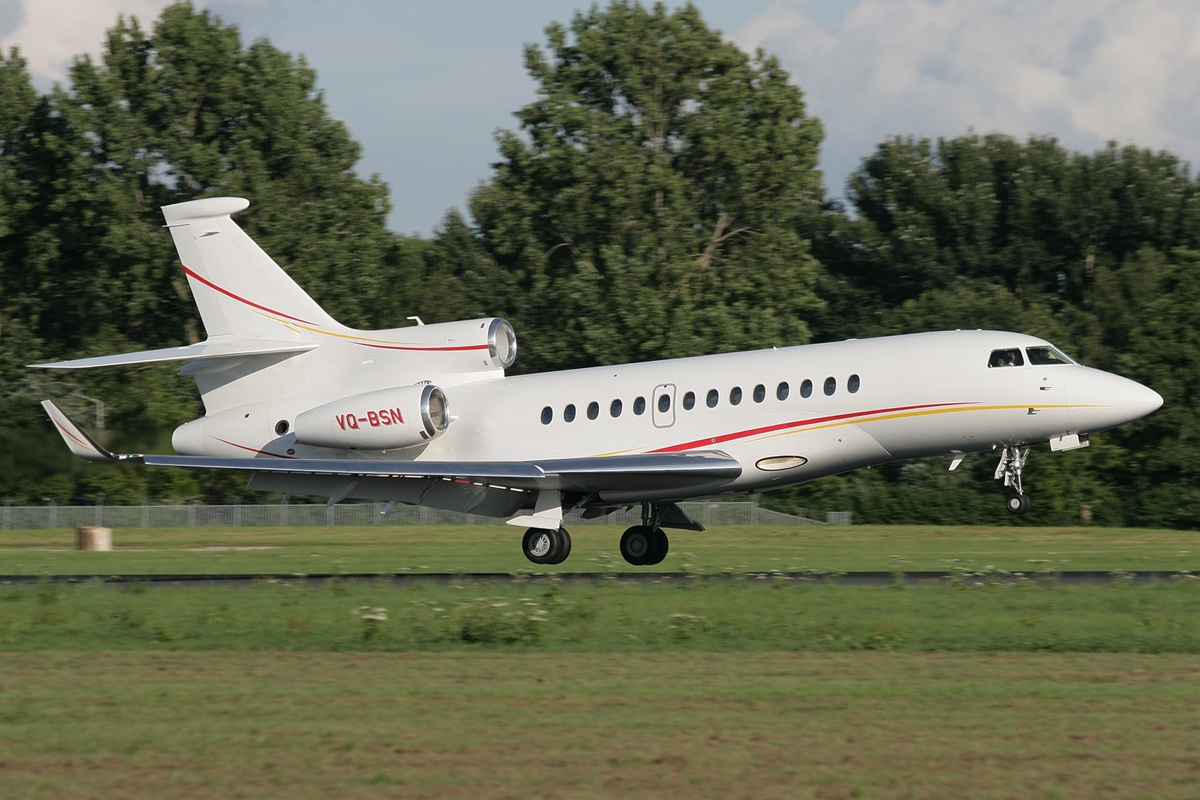
- Dassault Falcon 7X of Shell Aircraft International takes off from Rotterdam (Zestienhoven) (RTM / EHRD), Netherlands
IATA	ICAO	Call sign
—	SHE	PECTEN
- Founded: 1953; 73 years ago
- Operating bases: Zestienhoven (RTM / EHRD)
- Subsidiaries: Brunei Shell Petroleum (50:50 joint venture)
- Fleet size: 3x Falcon 8X
- Parent company: Shell plc
- Headquarters: Rotterdam, Netherlands

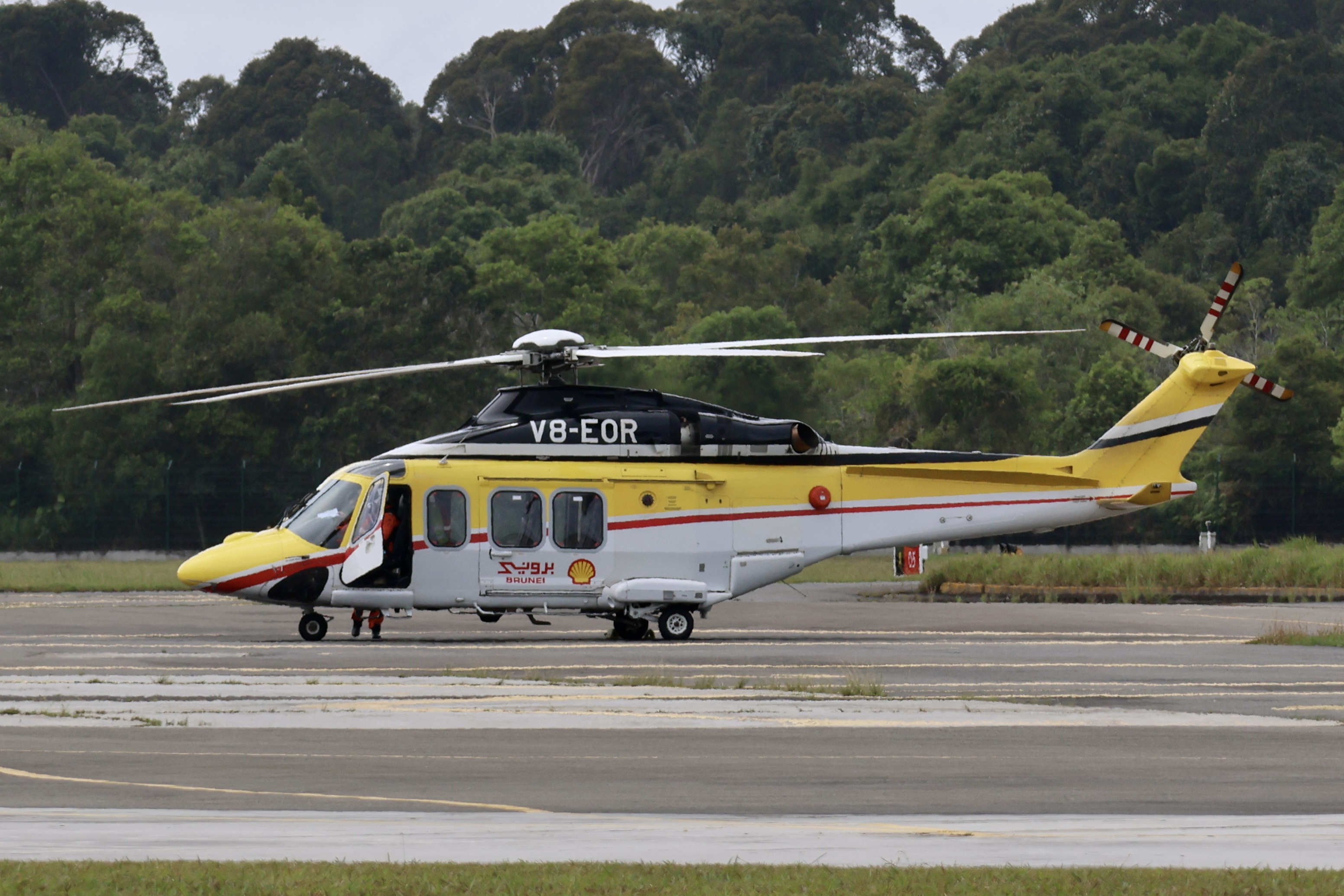
One of two AgustaWestland AW139 operated by subsidiary Brunei Shell Petroleum.

Shell Aircraft International, based at Rotterdam The Hague Airport, operates executive business jet aircraft for Shell plc headquarters, and for one Shell Group operating company, Shell Oil Company in the United States. It also provides advice on air operations and flight standards to Shell Group companies. Of historical note, Sir Douglas Bader, Second World War fighter pilot of the Royal Air Force (RAF) and double-leg amputee was aviation director in the United Kingdom for Royal Dutch Shell.

Prior to 2000, Shell Aircraft Limited operated corporate jets for Shell Group headquarters, and Shell Oil and Shell Canada operated their aircraft independently. In 2000, the three operations were linked in Shell Aircraft International, whose first CEO was Brian Humphries.

On 4 October 2013, the operation of Shell Canada Aviation based in Calgary was closed down after 60 years operation, and future operations were contracted out to Flair Airlines Ltd.

The ICAO telephony designator (call sign) changed from SHELL to PECTEN in the Edition 201 of the ICAO DOC 8585 Edition 201, published July 2022, however the three-letter designator remained SHE.

== Fleet ==
Shell Aircraft International fleet
Rotterdam, Netherlands	3× Dassault Falcon 8X
Anduki Airfield, Brunei Darussalam	2× AgustaWestland AW139 and 4× Sikorsky S-92

Shell Aircraft International also works with Brunei Shell Petroleum (BSP), the Shell Group's Brunei operating company (a 50-50 joint venture with the Brunei Government), which operates four Sikorsky S-92 and two AgustaWestland AW139. Brunei Shell Petroleum is the only Shell operating company to operate its own helicopters; elsewhere, helicopter operations are contracted out to companies such as Bristow Helicopters.

=== Former fleet ===
Aircraft formerly operated by Shell Aviation (former name of Shell Aircraft International) and its subsidiaries include British Aerospace HS-125-700B, Dassault Falcon 200, de Havilland DH.104 Dove, DHC-2 Beaver, DHC-3 Otter, DHC-6 Twin Otter, Dornier Do-28, Dornier 328-300 328JET Envoy 3, Douglas DC-3, Embraer 175, Fairchild F-27, and Piper PA-23 Aztec.

Former Brunei Shell Petroleum include Aérospatiale Alouette III, Auster J5B Autocar (VR-UDO), Beech 90, Beech 99, Percival P50 Prince, Short Sealand, Sikorsky S55 Whirlwind, Sikorsky S61 Sea King, and Vickers Supermarine Type 309 Sea Otter.
