= Ronald ToVue =

Provincial premier in Papua New Guinea

- Born: 17 February 1933; Rabaul District, East New Britain Province, Papua New Guinea
- Died: 25 December 2021 (aged 88); Port Moresby, Papua New Guinea
- Occupations: Entrepreneur and politician
- Known for: Premier of East New Britain Province; Founder member of the Pangu Pati
- Spouse: Suluet Tingvil
- Children: Three

Sir Ronald ToVue KBE (1933 – 2021) was a founding member of the Pangu Pati of Papua New Guinea (PNG), which formed the first government of the country after its Independence. He went on to become the premier of East New Britain Province from 1981 to 1989, as well as a successful businessman.

== Early life ==
ToVue was born in the Rabaul District of East New Britain on 17 February 1933. He attended Sogeri National High School, near Port Moresby, where he became friends with the future first prime minister of PNG, Michael Somare, as well as other future leaders, including Sir Vincent Eri, Sir Paulias Matane, and Sir Alkan Tololo, who were to form the core of the Pangu Pati.

== Career ==
In addition to becoming premier of East New Britain province, he served as the chair of the East New Britain Health Authority and of the Rabaul Development Authority Board. He also became a successful businessman in Rabaul, Kokopo and Port Moresby. He was a strong advocate of autonomy for East New Britain.

== Death ==
ToVue died in Port Moresby on Christmas Day 2021, having been medically evacuated from Rabaul on the previous day.

== Awards and honours ==
ToVue was made an Officer of the Order of the British Empire (OBE) in Queen Elizabeth II's 1982 New Year's Honours List and a Knight Bachelor (KBE) in the 1987 Birthday Honours.
