= Margaret Cicely Langton Greene =

British speech and language therapist

Margaret Cicely Langton Greene OBE FRCSLT
- Born: 16 July 1913
- Died: 26 September 2007 (aged 94); Wingrave
- Occupation: Speech Therapist

Academic work
- Sub-discipline: Voice disorders
- Institutions: RCSLT

Margaret Cicely Langton Greene OBE FRCSLT was a British speech and language therapist.

She was elected a Fellow of the Royal College of Speech and Language Therapists in 1957. She was also the editor of its Bulletin and its journal, Speech, in the mid- 1950s. In 1957 Greene published The Voice and its Disorders, which represented a major contribution to the clinical assessment and treatment of voice disorders and was amongst the few texts available on the subject at the time. The book is now into its 6th edition, most recently updated and re-published in 2001 by Lesley Mathieson.

In 1968 she founded AFASIC, the Association for all speech impaired children, a charity for children with speech problems.

Margaret Greene received an OBE in the 1987 Birthday Honours for services to Speech Therapy.

== Publications ==
- 1957. The Voice and its Disorders
- 1960. Learning to Talk. A guide for parents. London, William Heinemann.
