= Gordon Lakes =

Gordon Harry Lakes MC (27 August 1928 – 23 April 2006) was a former Deputy Director General in the UK Prison Service. He is credited with helping to achieve improved working conditions among UK prisons.

== Life and career ==
Gordon Lakes was born in Bridlington, East Riding of Yorkshire, in 1928. After training at Sandhurst he saw action in the Korean War with the Royal Northumberland Fusiliers and was awarded the Military Cross.

He joined the UK Prison Service in 1961 as an assistant governor. After working at several different prisons and gaining experience, he used his expertise to analyse causes of staffing problems.

Lakes was put in charge of Gartree prison in 1975. He was then transferred to Prisons HQ to apply his knowledge to help improve the prison service as a whole. This he did as Deputy Director General, helping achieve consensus between unions and management on difficult issues.

Lakes retired in 1988. Following his official retirement, Lakes spent another 15 years helping to resolve further prison crises. He also worked in Europe, for example in reviewing security following five murders in Swedish prisons, and advised on rebuilding the prison systems in the Baltic States.
