= Clive Foxell =

English physicist (1930–2016)

Clive Arthur Peirson Foxell CBE (27 February 1930 – 30 July 2016) was an English physicist who pioneered the use of fibre-optic technology and was an author on the history of the Metropolitan Railway about which he produced a number of books.

== Early life ==
Clive Foxell was born in Harrow on 27 February 1930, the only child of Arthur and Lillian Foxell. He was educated at Harrow High School and Acton Technical College. He married Shirley Morris, a librarian, in Chesham in 1956, and they had a daughter Elizabeth.

== Career ==
Towards the end of the Second World War, Foxell joined the electronics company GEC as an apprentice at its research laboratory in Wembley. While there, he also studied for a BSc degree at the University of London, which he received in 1954. Early in his career, he worked on lighting effects for several films, including Hamlet (1948) and Moby Dick (1956). He researched the use of semiconductors and silicon diodes and was influenced by Cyril Hilsum, who made Britain's first semiconductor laser. In 1967, he appeared with Hilsum on BBC One television's The New Electronics demonstrating the equipment.

In 1971, Foxell became managing director of GEC Semiconductors and, in 1975, he joined Post Office Telecommunications as deputy director of research at Martlesham Heath (now Adastral Park), with special responsibility for microelectronics, materials, and optical fibres systems. In 1977, he demonstrated the ability of fibre optic cables to transmit telephone calls using a 13 km glass cable link to send a message between the telephone exchanges at Martlesham and Ipswich in Suffolk. From 1982, he was director of British Telecommunications Systems and, in 1986, joined the board of British Telecommunications plc as managing director, engineering and procurement.

In retirement, he was vice-president of the Institution of Electrical Engineers and president of the Institute of Physics. He was appointed Commander of the Most Excellent Order of the British Empire (CBE) in 1990.

== Railways ==
Railways were an interest of Foxell from childhood, when he became aware of the Metropolitan Line while cycling to and from school near Chorleywood Common in Hertfordshire. He got a summer job as a cleaner at Neasden LNER locomotive sheds, where the other workers were mainly Italian prisoners of war. In later life, he travelled thousands of miles on the Metropolitan Line and wrote many books about its history and workings, as well as several local history works, most of which were self-published. A keen railway modeller, Foxell built his own replica of Rickmansworth station and an N gauge circuit, which featured in Railway Modeller magazine in July 2013.

== Death ==
Foxell died at Stoke Mandeville Hospital on 30 July 2016. He was survived by his wife Shirley, and daughter Elizabeth.

== Selected publications ==
- Chesham Shuttle: The Story of a Metropolitan Branch Line. Clive Foxell, 1996. ISBN 978-0952918400
- Chesham Branch Album. Clive Foxell, 1998. ISBN 978-0952918417
- Memories of the Met and GC Joint Line. Clive Foxell, 2002. ISBN 978-0952918431
- St. Mary's Church, Chesham: An Illustrated Short History. Clive Foxell, 2002. (With Shirley Foxell) ISBN 978-0952918448
- Rails to Metro-Land. Clive Foxell, 2005. ISBN 978-0952918455
- The Metropolitan Line: London's First Underground Railway. The History Press, 2010. ISBN 978-0752453965
- The Ten Cinemas of Chesham. Clive Foxell, 2010. ISBN 978-0956417800
- The Lowndes' Chesham Estate: The Early Photographs. Clive Foxell, 2011. ISBN 978-0956417824
- Images of 150 Years of the Metropolitan Railway. The History Press, 2012. ISBN 978-0752470092
- Echoes of the 'Met Line. Clive Foxell, 2014. ISBN 978-0956417831
- Shadows of the Metropolitan Railway. Clive Foxell, 2015. ISBN 978-0956417848
