= Robert Tiffany =

Robert Tiffany, OBE FRCN (30 December 1942 – February 1993) was a British nurse. He was a founding member of the International Society of Nurses in Cancer Care (ISNCC) and initiated the Biannual International Cancer Nursing Conference. He was also a founding member of the European Oncology Nursing Society and first President of the Society from 1985 to 1987.

An oncology nurse at the in London, later promoted to Director of Nursing, Tiffany worked to identify misconceptions regarding cancer, as well as cancer prevention, early detection, and improving the lives of those stricken with the disease. The Tiffany Lectureship was founded to inform and inspire oncology nurses worldwide.

He was made a Fellow of the Royal College of Nursing in 1982.

== Death ==
Robert Tiffany died in St. Bartholomew's Hospital, London, of bronchial pneumonia and renal failure, aged 50.

== Legacy ==
- The Robert Tiffany Annual Nursing Lectureship which honours those within cancer nursing who have made a significant contribution to cancer practice, education, research or management at a national, regional and/or international level
- The Robert Tiffany International Nursing Award
- The Robert Tiffany Ward at the Royal Marsden Hospital
