= Brian Humphries (British businessman) =

Former president and CEO of EBAA

Brian Humphries CBE is president and CEO of the European Business Aviation Association (EBAA), based in Brussels. He has served separate tenures at EBAA as chairman, president and CEO since 1996. He is also chairman of the British Helicopter Advisory Board and has served a three-year term as chairman of the Montreal-based International Business Aviation Council (IBAC), representing the interests of business aviation globally at ICAO.

== Career ==
Brian Humphries joined Shell Aircraft in late 1989 as an aviation adviser, having served in the Royal Air Force in ranks up to Air Commodore in a variety of appointments with both flying and engineering responsibilities. After becoming managing director of Shell Aircraft Limited in 1994, his duties were expanded in 2000 when he also became the CEO of Shell Aircraft International, accountable for all Shell Aircraft's operations worldwide, amounting to more than 100,000 flying hours per year. Humphries retired from Shell in April-2005.
