= Knights Templar in popular culture =

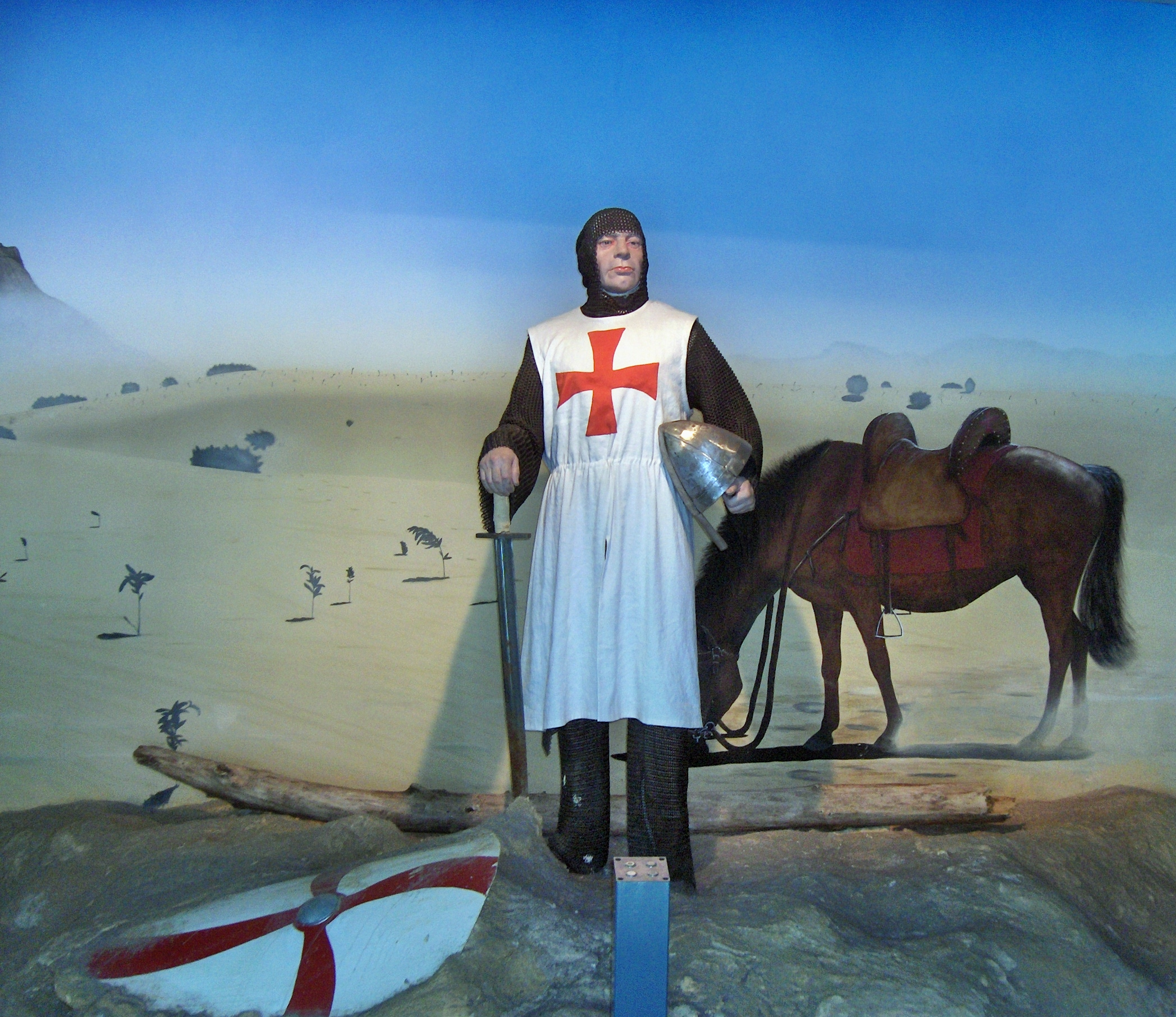
Representation of a Knight Templar (Ten Duinen Abbey museum, 2010 photograph)

The original historic Knights Templar were a Christian military order, the Order of the Poor Fellow Soldiers of Christ and of the Temple of Solomon, that existed from the 12th to 14th centuries to provide warriors in the Crusades. These men were famous in the high and late Middle Ages, but the Order was disbanded very suddenly by King Philip IV of France, who took action against the Templars in order to avoid repaying his own financial debts. He accused them of heresy, ordered the arrest of all Templars within his realm, put the Order under trial and many of them burned at the stake. The dramatic and rapid end of the Order led to many stories and legends developing about them over the following centuries. The Order and its members increasingly appear in modern fiction, though most of these references portray the medieval organization inaccurately.

In modern works, the Templars generally are portrayed as villains, misguided zealots, representatives of an evil secret society, or as the keepers of a long-lost treasure. Several modern organizations also claim heritage from the medieval Templars, as a way of enhancing their own image or mystique.

== Modern organizations ==
=== Temperance movement ===
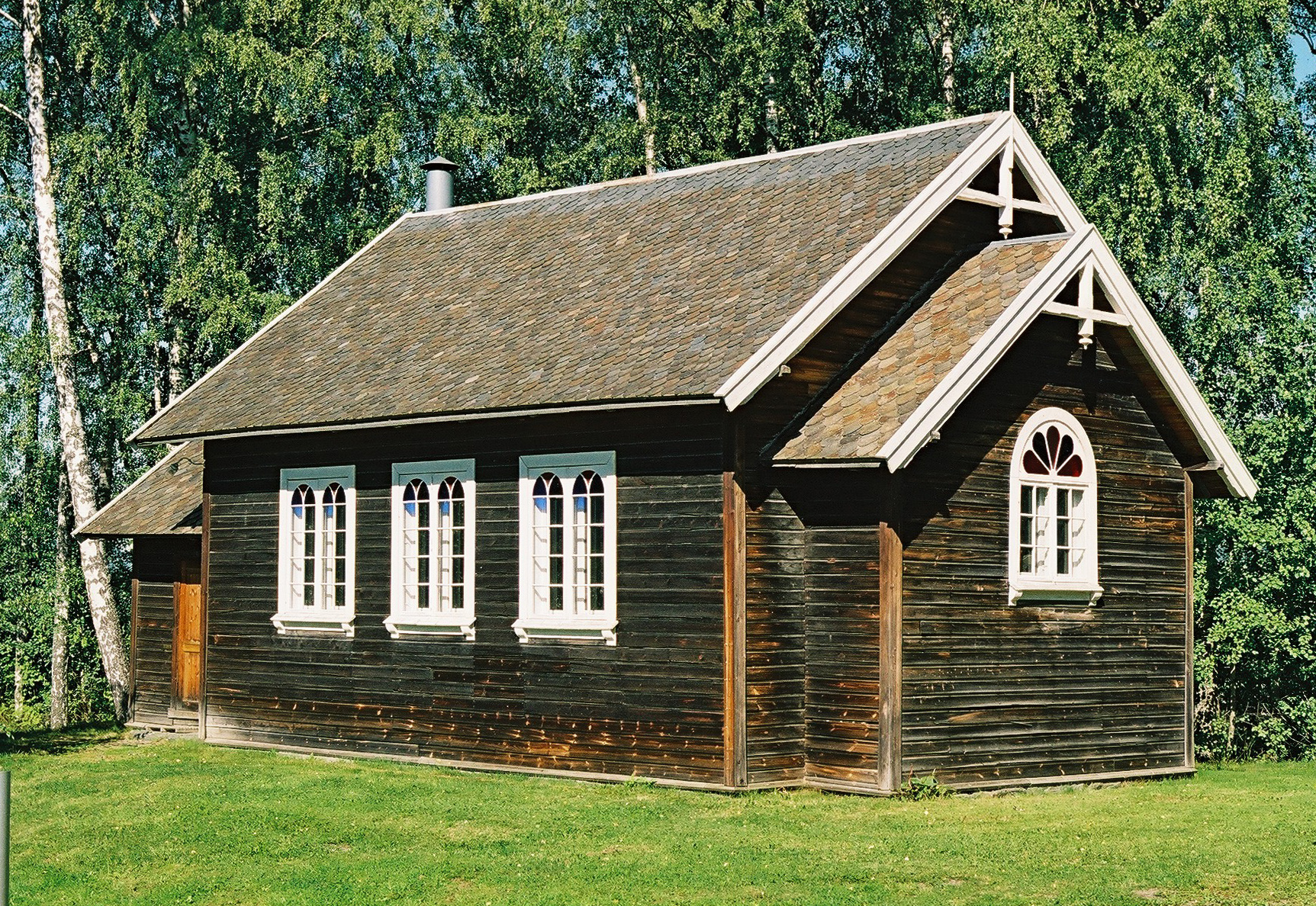
A lodge of the International Order of Good Templars in Vågå Municipality in Norway.

Many temperance organizations named themselves after the Poor Fellow-Soldiers of Christ and of the Temple of Solomon, citing the belief that the original Knights Templar "drank sour milk, and also because they were fighting 'a great crusade' against 'this terrible vice' of alcohol." The largest of these, the International Order of Good Templars (IOGT), grew throughout the world after being started in the 19th century and continues to advocate for the abstinence of alcohol and other drugs. Other Orders in this tradition include those of the Templars of Honor and Temperance (Tempel Riddare Orden), which has a large presence in Scandinavia.

=== Freemasonry ===
Freemasonry has contained references to the Knights Templar since at least the 18th century; Templar symbols and rituals are incorporated in a number of Masonic bodies.

The best-known reference to the Knights Templar in Freemasonry is the Degree of Knight of the Temple, or "Order of the Temple", the final order joined in "The United Religious, Military and Masonic Orders of the Temple and of St John of Jerusalem, Palestine, Rhodes and Malta" commonly known as the Knights Templar. Freemasonry is traditionally open to men of all faiths, asking only that they have a belief in a supreme being, but membership in this Masonic body (and others) is open only to Freemasons who profess a belief in the Christian religion. These Knights Templar often take part in public parades and exhibitions, wearing distinctive uniforms and have had a number of high-profile members, such as Henry Ford and Harry S. Truman.

In the later 20th century, masonic Knights Templar became the subject of pseudohistorical theories connecting them to the medieval order, even though such a connection is rejected by Masonic authorities themselves and the source known to historians.

== Scholarly reception ==
The popularity of the Knights Templar in modern fiction and their presence in pseudohistorical or fringe literature has received scholarly attention.

At the 2005 Annual Conference of the American Culture Association, their call for papers was specifically about such conspiracy theories relating to the Templars and their association with other legends and mysterious organizations. Literary theorists puzzle over Umberto Eco's use in his novel Foucault's Pendulum of the Templars as a symbol of postmodernist rewriting of history. Historian Malcolm Barber writes that "Mystic Templars are omnipresent in all good conspiracy theories." On Day to Day, a program on American NPR, host Alex Chadwick discussed "the literary fascination with the Knights Templar." In Poland, the Toruń Museum had an exhibition entitled "The Knights Templar – History and Myth" which offered a description, "Apart from pieces of "high art", the exhibit will grant equal importance to "popular culture" items (literature, film, Internet content) exploring the subject of the Knights Templar." In 2007, a National Post editorial noted that "the Templars remain a living presence in popular culture. This has happened precisely because the historical record concerning their sudden annihilation in the early-14th century at the hands of Philip IV ("the Fair") of France has been so sparse and ambiguous. Time and revolution have damaged and dispersed the sources, and made the Templars a magnet for speculation and imagination."

== Popular themes ==
Popular themes are their supposed association with the Holy Grail and the Ark of the Covenant, and the supposed historical connection to the Freemasons.

The historical Templars had their first headquarters on the Temple Mount, which had been assigned to them by King Baldwin II of Jerusalem. They were in operation there for 75 years. Pseudo-historical books such as The Holy Blood and the Holy Grail theorise that the Templars could have discovered documents hidden in the ruins of the Temple, possibly "proving" that Jesus survived the Crucifixion or possibly "proving" Jesus was married to Mary Magdalene and had children by her. Indeed, the supposition that the Templars must have found something under the Temple Mount lies at the heart of most Templar legends and pseudo-historical theories, also popularised by French author Louis Charpentier (1966). There is no physical or documentary evidence, however, to support such a supposition. It is true that they are documented as having carried a piece of the True Cross into some battles, but this was probably a portion of a timber that was discovered during the 4th century by Saint Helena, the mother of the Emperor Constantine.

=== Relics and treasure ===
There are various legends concerning a treasure that some Templars managed to hide from King Philip and that was later lost. One particular story concerns Rennes-le-Château, where a treasure was supposedly found in the 19th century; one speculative source for that treasure was the long-lost treasure of the Templars.

In a 1910 publication by one Joaquín Miret y Sans, the case is made that the Knights Templar hid and buried the great treasure in Vrana, Zadar County, because Ramón from Serò near Granja del Pairs in Noguera (comarca) in Catalonia gave a generous gift to the Knights Templar into the hands of their Grand Master Arnold of Torroja. This Ramón was the son of Romana the daughter of Benesmiro de Siponto who was the justitiarius of Monte Sant'Angelo and who was sent by Pope Alexander III as a notifier to Šibenik.

Hugh J. Schonfield (1984) argued that the Knights Templar may have found the Copper Scroll treasure of the Qumran Essenes in the tunnels beneath the Temple Mount. He suggested that this might explain one of the charges of heresy which were later brought against the knights by the Medieval Inquisition. In fact the Copper Scroll was discovered by an archaeologist. The scroll, on two rolls of copper, was found on March 14, 1952 at the back of Cave 3 at Qumran. It was the last of 15 scrolls discovered in the cave, and is thus referred to as 3Q15.

==== Shroud of Turin ====
Another legendary object that is claimed to have some connection with the Templars is the Shroud of Turin. The shroud was first publicly displayed in 1357 by the widow of a nobleman known as Geoffrey of Charney, described by some sources as being a member of the family of the grandson of Geoffroi de Charney, who was burned at the stake with De Molay.

In 2009, Barbara Frale, a paleographer in the Vatican Secret Archives, claimed that the Shroud of Turin had been kept by the Templars after 1204. Frale also claimed that "the burial certificate of Jesus the Nazarene", imprinted in fragments of Greek, Hebrew and Latin writing, is visible on the shroud.

The so-called Templecombe painting, a painting discovered in 1945 by Mrs Molly Drew in the roof of an outhouse of a cottage in Templecombe, England, has been alleged to be a copy of the image on the Turin Shroud, and therefore evidence of the Turin Shroud being in the possession of the Knights Templar during its "hidden years". The painting has been on display in St Mary's Church in the village since 1956 (the only Templar-related site to have survived there), and has been carbon-dated to c. 1280. Some people believe that it is a Templar-commissioned image of either Jesus Christ or the severed head of John the Baptist, although it is without a Halo.

=== De Molay's curse ===
Malcolm Barber (2006) discusses a supposed curse uttered by the last Grand Master of the Templar Order, Jacques de Molay, as he was burned at the stake in 1314. Jacques de Molay supposedly cursed Philip IV of France and Pope Clement V, saying that he would meet them before God before the year was out. Pope Clement died only a month later, King Phillip died later that year in a hunting accident. Further, within a short span of years thereafter each of Phillip's sons died at relatively young ages, resulting in the end of the House of Capet, leading to disputes over succession and The Hundred Years' War as different factions battled for the throne.

Barber traces this story to a verse chronicle attributed to Geoffrey of Paris (La Chronique métrique attribuée à Geffroi de Paris, ed. A. Divèrres, Strasbourg, 1956, pp. 5711–5742). Geoffrey of Paris was "apparently an eye-witness, who describes Molay as showing no sign of fear and, significantly, as telling those present that God would avenge their deaths".

Albert Pike claimed the Knight Kadosh, the 30th degree within the Ancient Accepted and Scottish Rite, commonly known as a 'Vengeance degree', involved the trampling on the Papal tiara and the royal crown, destined to wreak a just vengeance on the high criminals for the murder of de Molay: the figure of Hiram Abiff representing Jacques de Molay, with the three assassins representing Philip IV of France, Pope Clement V and Squin de Florian. Malcolm Barber has cited a Masonic legend, resembling Pike's claims, in Louis Claude Cadet de Gassicourt's Le Tombeau de Jacques Molai (Paris, 1796, first edition).

A series of mid-20th-century novels, Les Rois maudits (The Accursed Kings) by Maurice Druon, which were first published in 1955, expanded on the story of the curse of Jacques de Molay and the French monarchy in the fourteenth century:

"Cursed, you’ll be all cursed, until the thirteenth generation of your races will have disappeared!"

— Maurice Druon

A popular version of the legend attributes to the curse the death of Louis XVI, saying he belonged to the thirteenth generation after Philip IV. The thirteenth generation is in fact that of Louis XIV's children. A frequent recurring legend relates how when Louis XVI was guillotined, an anonymous French Freemason rushed from the crowd, dipped his hand in the king's blood (or grabbed the head and held it, or is just heard in the crowd) and yelled, "Jacques de Molay, thou art avenged!"

=== Claims of hidden survival ===
==== Supposed Continuity in Freemasonry ====
Some historians and authors have tried to draw a link from Freemasonry and its many branches to the Templars. Degrees in the Ancient and Accepted Scottish Rite such as the Knight of Saint Andrew, the Knight of Rose-Croix, and the 32nd Degree in Consistory make reference to a "Masonic Knights Templar" connection, but this is usually dismissed as being ceremonial and not historical fact.

John J. Robinson argues for the Templar–Masonic connection in his book Born in Blood: The Lost Secrets of Freemasonry, in which he alleges that some French Templars fled to Scotland after the suppression of the Order, fearing persecution from both Church and state. He claims that they sought refuge with a lodge of Scottish stonemasons within which they began to teach the virtues of chivalry and obedience, using the builder's tools as a metaphor; and they began eventually taking in "speculative masons" (men of other professions) in order to ensure the continuation of the Order. According to Robinson, the Order existed in secret in this form until the formation of the United Grand Lodge of England in 1717. An example of Templar–Masonic transitory symbolism can supposedly be found in Rosslyn Chapel, owned by the first Earls of Rosslyn, a family with well-documented ties to Scottish Freemasonry; however, Rosslyn Chapel itself dates from at least 100 years after the suppression of the Templars.

The case is also made in Michael Baigent’s and Richard Leigh’s book The Temple and the Lodge.

However, historians Mark Oxbrow, Ian Robertson, Karen Ralls and Louise Yeoman have each made it clear that the Sinclair family had no connection with the Medieval Knights Templar. The Sinclairs’ testimony against the Knights at their 1309 trial is not consistent with any alleged support or membership. In "The Templars and the Grail" Karen Ralls states that among some 50 who testified against the Templars were Henry and William Sinclair.

==== Knights Templar in Scotland ====
Since the 1980s, there has been a growing body of publications in both popular fiction and pseudohistory which construct a continuity between the historical presence of the Knights Templar in Scotland with the emergence of Masonic Scottish Knights Templar in the early modern period.

The idea of an association with Rosslyn Chapel originates in the 1982 book The Holy Blood and the Holy Grail and entered mainstream pop culture with Dan Brown's The Da Vinci Code (2003), reinforced by the subsequent film of the same name (2006). Numerous books were published after 2003 to cater to the popular interest in supposed connections between Rosslyn Chapel, Freemasonry, the Templars and the Holy Grail generated by Brown's novel.

The tale of a missing Templar fleet is supposedly based on the protocol of the interrogation of Jean de Châlons by the Inquisition. He claimed that he had heard that preceptor of the French Templars, Gérard de Villiers, had been warned of his imminent arrest. De Villiers had escaped with 50 horses and eighteen galleys. De Châlons' son, Hugues de Châlons, escaped with him carrying the wealth of his uncle, Hugues de Pairaud. In Baigent and Leigh's The Temple and the Lodge, the fleet carried the treasure of the Paris preceptory of the Templars.

Scotland became the destination of the fleet over four centuries later, in the claims of George Frederick Johnson, an exiled Jacobite living in Austria. Johnson, however, turned out to be a fraudster who was probably called Johann Samuel Leuchte. After a chequered career based on alchemy and forgery, "Johnson" convinced a masonic lodge in Jena that he possessed the highest secrets of masonry, and having declared the rest of German masonry irregular, brought a surprising amount of lodges under his control. Exposed as a fraud by Karl Gotthelf von Hund in 1764, he was later apprehended by a previous victim, and spent the rest of his life in prison.

Hund's initial attraction to Johnson was spurred by a need to find his own superiors. He had been received into the Order of the Temple by high ranking Jacobites in Paris during 1743, being introduced to Charles Edward Stuart himself. After the failure of the 1745 rebellion, his masters were either in hiding or dead, and had lost interest in maintaining their Templar offshoots, leaving Hund with a depleted ritual book which he had to reconstruct from memory. As Johnson's collection of lodges now looked to him for leadership, the Rite of Strict Observance was born. Again, the foundation myth alleged that Freemasonry was started by Templar refugees under the protection of Robert the Bruce. This time, they had travelled from France through England disguised as stonemasons, and their use of masonic symbols in their allegories paid tribute to this deception.

Under Hund's leadership, the Rite of Strict Observance became the most popular branch of Freemasonry in the German states, with lodges all over Continental Europe. However, Hund's continuing inability to produce, or even contact his "Unknown Superiors" led to increasing dissatisfaction. Six years after his death, a convent meeting in Wilhelmsbad from 1782 to 1783 finally agreed that Freemasonry had no connection to the Templars, and Strict Observance ceased to exist, most lodges being absorbed into the Rectified Scottish Rite. For most of the previous two decades, the most common foundation myth among German masons stated that Freemasonry came from the Knights Templar, protected and allowed to flourish in Scotland.

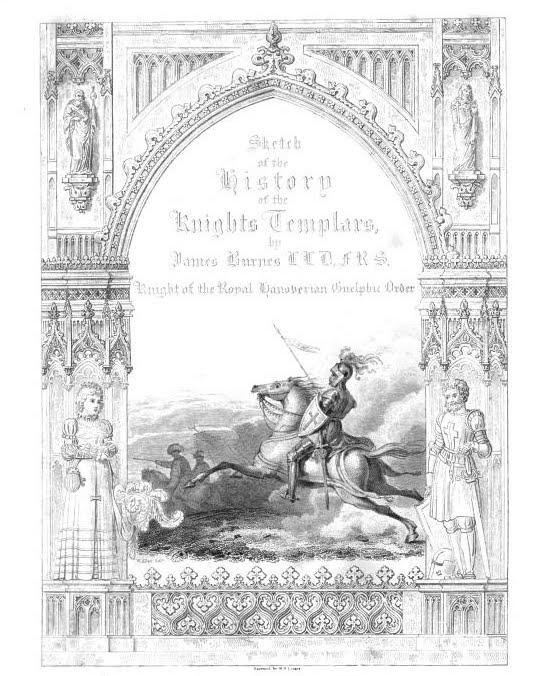
Illustration from Sketch of the history of the Knights templars (1840) by James Burnes

In 1815, Claude Thory, a respected French scientist and Freemason, claimed that Robert the Bruce had created the Order of St. Andrew for masons who had supported him at Bannockburn, which was later joined to the Order of Heredom, which he founded at Kilwinning. In 1837, a Scottish Freemason, James Burnes, in attempting to revive a Scottish order of "Knights Templar", expanded the masonic link to Bannockburn. He introduced the Knights Templar as the bearers on Freemasonry to Scotland, and had the Templars play a crucial part in the battle. This appears to be the basis of subsequent tales of Templar involvement at Bannockburn. The contemporary Royal Order of Scotland makes use of a similar foundation myth, which is no more intended to be taken as historical fact than any other piece of masonic allegory.

==== Discoverers of the New World ====
A supposed Templar treasure in New York City is featured in the movie National Treasure (2004), starring Nicolas Cage.

As early as 2001, historian Helen Nicholson, in a popular history of the Templars, dispels the idea that the Templars could "spare ships to indulge in world exploration".

The Templar Code for Dummies (2007) also points out the historical implausibility of this scenario:

"As for having 18 galleys that may have left from La Rochelle, history doesn't back that up...In shipping records from La Rochelle of the period, there is no record that the Templars had 18 galleys, much less that 18 galleys were at La Rochelle. Reports in the years leading up to the arrest seem to imply that the Templars (and the Hospitallers, for that matter) actually had very few large ships – some suggest no more than four – and hired more from merchant shippers when needed" - Source: Hodapp, Christopher; Von Kannon, Alice (2007). The Templar Code for Dummies. Wiley Publishing Inc. p. 157. ISBN 978-0-470-12765-0.

==== September 11 conspiracy theory ====
In "The Twin Towers and the Great Masonic Experiment: Has the 'End of Days' Begun?" Richard C. Hoagland applies esoteric numerology in his theory that the terrorist attacks on the World Trade Center on September 11, 2001, were carried out by the Order of Assassins against the Knights Templar. Michael Barkun, Professor Emeritus of Political Science at Syracuse University, summarizes and discusses Hoagland's 9/11 Templar conspiracy theory in A Culture of Conspiracy: Apocalyptic Visions in Contemporary America: "Each World Trade Center Tower had 110 floors, a multiple of 11. One of them was struck by flight 11, which had 11 crew members, and so on. […] The order of the Knights Templar was recognized by the Vatican in the year 1118, whose integers add up to 11. There are 883 years between that date and 2001, and the sum of those numbers, 19, is the same as the number of hijackers. The number 19 allowed Hoagland to introduce the Koranic numerology of Rashad Khalifa, in which it is central. By the time Hoagland finished, the events of September 11 were revealed to be an attack by none other than the Islamic Order of Assassins on the Knights Templar and the Masons!"

=== Friday the 13th ===
There is a modern urban legend to the effect that the tradition of viewing Friday the 13th as unlucky originates with the date of the simultaneous arrest of many Templars at the behest of Philip IV of France, on Friday, 13 October 1307.

== Notable examples ==
Some notable works which have featured the Knights Templar, or stand-ins for them, are listed below.

=== Film ===
- An early film by Victorin-Hippolyte Jasset, Le Roi Philippe le Bel et les Templiers (1910), dramatizes Philip IV's campaign against the order.
- Tombs of the Blind Dead (1972) is a Spanish-Portuguese horror film about living dead Knights Templar.
- National Treasure (2004) features the Knights Templar as the smugglers of a massive treasure before forming the Freemasons.
- In Get Out (2017), the Armitage family is hinted to have ancestral roots with the Knights Templar, since they have a Templar helmet that they use to kidnap young black men with. In addition, director Jordan Peele has confirmed this fact in his commentary.

=== Television ===
- The 1983 BBC drama The Dark Side of the Sun featured a secret society descended from the Knights Templar, who are active in the modern world.
- In the Robin of Sherwood episode "Seven Poor Knights From Acre" (1984), the Knights Templar appear as antagonists who try to kill Robin and his fellow outlaws, whom the knights falsely believe have stolen a sacred Templar relic.
- Carnivàle (2003–2005) had its 1930s characters encounter magical rings bearing symbols of the Templar order.
- In the FX series, The Bastard Executioner (2015), The Dark Mute is a Templar Knight.

=== Video games ===
- Civilization III: Conquests featured the Knights Templar as a Great Wonder the player can build. The player who builds the wonder receives a crusader every 5 turns.
- The Assassin's Creed video game series features the Templars as the main antagonists. Their goal is similar to the Assassin Brotherhood, as they also strive to establish world peace. However, the Templars believe this goal can only be achieved by exerting influence and control over all of humankind. The fictitious conflict between the Assassins and the Templars is explored through the main series and spinoff games in the franchise.

=== Tabletop games ===
- The miniature tabletop wargame Trench Crusade is set in an alternate history world where a warband of the Knights Templar was manipulated by a daemonic artifact and committed what is known in-universe as the "Act of Ultimate Heresy" by opening a Gate to Hell in Jerusalem, starting almost a thousand years of war between humanity and the forces of Hell. This also created distrust towards other orders of crusader knights.

=== Literature and comics ===
- M. R. James' 1904 story "'Oh, Whistle, and I'll Come to You, My Lad'" features its hero, Parkins, finding a strange whistle in the ruins of a Templar preceptory.
- Zofia Kossak-Szczucka's historical novel Król trędowaty (1937, translated in English as The Leper King) features villainous Templars who secretly follow a pre-Christian religion.
- Pierre Klossowski's experimental novel The Baphomet (1965) features the ghosts of the Templars appearing each year to commemorate their order's destruction.
- William Watson's novel, Beltran in Exile (1979), is about a Knight Templar travelling to Scotland after the Crusades.
- Edward Burman's novel The Image of Our Lord (1991) centers around the conflict between Philip the Fair and the Templars.
- Catherine Jinks' children's novel Pagan's Crusade (1992) has its titular hero adopted by a Knight who is a member of the Templar Order.
- Katherine Kurtz has written many books with Templar characters and themes, and edited three anthologies about the Templars: Tales of the Knights Templar (1995), On Crusade: More Tales of the Knights Templar (1998) and Crusade of Fire (2002).
- Paul C. Doherty's historical mystery novel, Satan's Fire (1996), features the Knights Templar as part of its plot.
- James D. MacDonald's thriller The Apocalypse Door (2002) is an Alternate history novel where the Knights Templar survived into the twenty-first century.
- Michael Spradlin's Youngest Templar (2009-2011) series is about the adventures of Tristan, a young boy who joins the Templar order.
- Jordan Mechner, LeUyen Pham and Alexander Puvilland created the graphic novel, Templar in 2013. This is about the adventures of a Templar knight, Martin of Troyes, in the aftermath of the order's dissolution.
- Elizabeth Chadwick's novel,Templar Silks (2018), focuses on a servant of the elderly William Marshal attempting to retrieve the titular silks from the Holy Land, so Marshall can fulfill a vow to the Templars.

=== Music ===
- David Bowie's 1985 song "Loving the Alien" makes reference to the Templars.
- The song "Templars" by Sabaton, the lead single from their 2025 album Legends, is about the Knights Templar.

=== Audio drama ===
- The 2016 audio drama Robin of Sherwood: The Knights Of The Apocalypse has Robin and his companions come into conflict with the titular Knights. The Knights of the Apocalypse are described as a splinter group from the Knights Templar. The Knights of the Apocalypse are also depicted in the play as having abandoned Christianity and instead worshiping the demon Baphomet.

== See also ==
- Temple Society
- Deus vult
