= Roland de Vaux =

20th-century French archaeologist

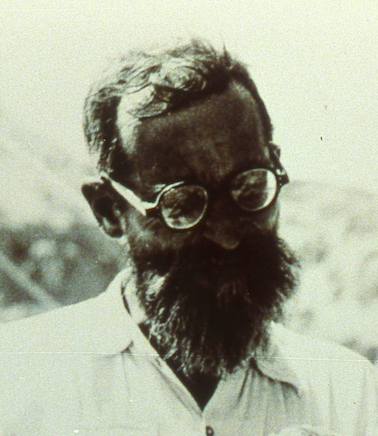
Father Roland de Vaux

Roland Guérin de Vaux OP (17 December 1903 – 10 September 1971) was a French Dominican priest who led the Catholic team that initially worked on the Dead Sea Scrolls. He was the director of the École Biblique, a French Catholic Theological School in East Jerusalem, and he was charged with overseeing research on the scrolls. His team excavated the ancient site of Khirbet Qumran (1951–1956) as well as several caves near Qumran northwest of the Dead Sea. The excavations were led by Ibrahim El-Assouli, caretaker of the Palestine Archaeological Museum, or what came to be known as the Rockefeller Museum in Jerusalem.

== Life ==
De Vaux was born in Paris in 1903, entered the priesthood in 1929 and became a Dominican later the same year. From 1934 till his death in 1971 he lived in Jerusalem, first studying at the École Biblique, then teaching various subjects including history and exegesis there. From 1938 to 1953 he was the editor of Revue Biblique. He became interested in archaeological studies while living in Jerusalem, learning as he went from people such as William F. Albright, Kathleen Kenyon and Benjamin Mazar. In 1945 he became the director of the École, a position he held until 1965. In 1956, although not an epigraphist, de Vaux became the editor in chief for the gradual production of the Dead Sea Scrolls, being responsible for the first five volumes of the Discoveries in the Judaean Desert, the official publication for editions of the scrolls. He continued as editor until his death in Jerusalem in 1971.

== Archaeology ==
He had worked on several excavations when Gerald Lankester Harding, the director of the Jordanian Antiquities Department, contacted him in 1947 to investigate a cave near the Dead Sea where some scrolls had been found. By that time he had been director of the Ecole Biblique for four years. The cave later became known in Qumran nomenclature as Cave 1, the first cave to yield texts which became known as the Dead Sea Scrolls.

The first of five seasons of excavations at the nearby Qumran ruins commenced in December 1951. Besides excavating Qumran, de Vaux also did seasons at Wadi Murabba'at with Lankester Harding in 1952, and at 'Ein Feshkha, a few kilometres south of Qumran, in 1958, while returning regularly to Tell el-Far'ah (north) from 1946 to 1960.

As de Vaux worked at Qumran and its vicinity more scrolls were found and these discoveries brought a small group of young scholars of Hebrew to work on them. These scholars, some of whom worked on their allotted scrolls for decades, included Józef Milik, John Marco Allegro and John Strugnell.

From 1961 to 1963 he worked with Kathleen Kenyon in excavations in Jerusalem.

De Vaux chose not to publish a definitive archaeological report for his work at Qumran despite worldwide interest, though he left behind him copious notes, which have been synthesized and published by Jean-Baptiste Humbert in 1994, in 2003 and in 2016.

== Writings ==
Beside contributing many articles for the Revue Biblique while he was editor and two chapters for the first volume of the Cambridge Ancient History ("Palestine during the neolithic and chalcolithic periods" and "Palestine in the Early Bronze Age"), de Vaux is famous for the following two works.

=== Archaeology and the Dead Sea Scrolls ===
In 1959 he gave the Schweich Lectures at the British Academy, in which he presented his analysis of the archaeological site of Qumran. His conclusions included the following:

1) The site of Qumran, besides an early use during the Iron Age, was inhabited from around 135 BCE to some time after 73 CE. This represented three separate periods of occupation, Period I, to the earthquake of 31 BCE, Period II from the reign of Archelaus, 4 CE, to the destruction at the hands of the Romans at the start of the Jewish War in 68 CE, and Period III, Roman military occupation until some time before the end of the century.

2) The nearby caves which contained the scrolls were related to the settlement at Qumran, as they both featured similar artefacts.

3) The site was the home of a Jewish sect known as the Essenes and that the contents of the scrolls often reflect what is known of the Essenes from the ancient Jewish historian, Josephus.

These lectures were published as Archaeology and the Dead Sea Scrolls.

=== Ancient Israel ===
In his two volume set, Ancient Israel Volume 1: Social Institutions (1958) and Ancient Israel Volume 2: Religious Institutions (1960), de Vaux wrote comprehensively about what archaeology seemed to reveal about Ancient Israel.

The Jerusalem Bible

de Vaux is largely responsible for the introductions and notes in La Bible de Jerusalem (1961) which was translated into English and other languages to become The Jerusalem Bible edited by Alexander Jones and published in 1966.

== Criticism ==
In their work The Dead Sea Scrolls Deception, Michael Baigent and Richard Leigh heavily criticized de Vaux, describing him as "ruthless, narrow-minded, bigoted and fiercely vindictive," anti-semitic and a fascist sympathizer. The Dead Sea Scrolls Deception has, in turn, been denounced by scholars as consisting largely of a "pattern of errors and misinformed statements". Two later books, devoted to the interpretation of the excavations of de Vaux, were published by Jean-Baptiste Humbert in 2003 and 2016.
