= The Jesus Papers =

2006 book by Michael Baigent

The Jesus Papers, by Michael Baigent

The Jesus Papers: Exposing the Greatest Cover-Up in History is a book by author Michael Baigent published in 2006. Providing his detailed history of Jesus' life and crucifixion, using papers that (according to the author) were covered up, the book documents the political context of Jesus' birth and then goes on to examine the history of the migration of the family of Jesus, the chronicles of his teachings, and his death. The book was published on the same day that The Da Vinci Code by Dan Brown became available as a paperback in the US.

== Content ==
In The Jesus Papers, author Michael Baigent claims that after having been taken down alive from the Cross, Jesus was removed from the tomb at night by Joseph of Arimathea and Nicodemus, then smuggled away to Egypt along with his wife, Mary Magdalene. They settled in Cairo, in or near the Temple of Onias, but due to unrest in the area moved to Narbonne in the south of France in AD 38. Other Jewish families had settled in Narbonne claiming descent from King David.

Baigent claims the source of Bérenger Saunière's mysterious wealth was derived from his discovery of hidden documents that proved this was all historically factual. Baigent argues that Station XIV of the Cross in the church of Rennes-le-Château, showing a full moon, indicates that the Sabbath/Passover had begun, and shows Joseph of Arimathea carrying the live body of Jesus out of the tomb.

Baigent claims to have seen two papyrus documents—the "Jesus papers"—written in Aramaic, discovered in the Old City of Jerusalem during the 1960s. Baigent claimed these documents dated to AD 45 and were letters to the Sanhedrin from bani meshiha ("the Messiah of the Children of Israel"), defending himself against the allegation that he claimed to be the Son of God.

Baigent claims these two papyrus documents were authenticated by the Israeli archaeologists Yigael Yadin and Nahman Avigad. Baigent claims that Pope John XXIII asked Baigent's friend to destroy these two papyrus documents, but he refused and said he would release them after 25 years. However, the documents have not been released because of the rift this information would create between Israel and the Vatican, also creating a revival of Antisemitism.

== Criticism ==
Hershel Shanks, reviewing The Jesus Papers for Biblical Archaeology Review, commented on the "foolishness of its central thesis", noting how Baigent had seen papyri written in Aramaic, a language that he did not understand, yet was able to say that what he saw dated from "about A.D. 34." Shanks noted that archaeological finds cannot be dated so precisely, adding that the two previous famous archaeologists who had allegedly seen these papyri were now conveniently dead. Kevin McClure, reviewing the book for Fortean Times commented how the author was unable to obtain photographs of the said papyri, adding that "Baigent records no further effort to investigate these supposedly amazing documents, and appears not to have approached any academic body or community for help". The Biblical historian Craig Evans has described the book as "one of the worst examples of pseudo-scholarship ever published".

There are criticisms that the release of the book was timed with the release of The Da Vinci Code film version in an attempt to cash in on the marketing hype. Baigent's response is on p. 355 of the book, where he points out that the publication schedule had been set by Harper Collins long before. Around the same time of the book's release, Baigent was also involved in a plagiarism lawsuit against author Dan Brown, which he acknowledges in the postscript. The lawsuit claims that Brown improperly used information from The Holy Blood and the Holy Grail (which Baigent co-wrote) for Brown's novel The Da Vinci Code. This too has drawn speculation that the lawsuit and trial were merely a publicity vehicle for Baigent's new book, although the £3 million costs that remain under appeal will likely negate any gain proceeds from the sale of the book. On 7 April 2006, High Court judge Sir Peter Smith rejected the copyright infringement claim by Baigent and Richard Leigh, and Dan Brown won the court case.

== Interviews ==
Baigent appeared on the Today Show in an interview with Lester Holt, in which he claimed that he had seen the papers referred to in the title. Baigent says the papers themselves prove that Jesus existed after his crucifixion, and therefore he could not have been put to death. Baigent referred to Jesus the mystical man rather than to Jesus the mythical messiah, and to books containing teachings attributed to Jesus that were voted out of the Christian Bible centuries ago.

Michael Baigent also appeared in another similar televised interview on The O'Reilly Factor, 26 April 2006.

== Editions ==
- The Jesus Papers: Exposing the Greatest Cover-Up in History ISBN 0-06-082713-0, March 28, 2006, Harper Collins Publications

== See also ==
- The Jesus Scroll by Donovan Joyce
