= Scottish Knights Templar =

Modern Orders of Knights Templar

The eight-pointed Maltese cross of the modern Scottish Knights Templar association.

The Cross pattée of the Scottish Knights Templar from the Scottish Commandery of St Clair, Grand Priory of the Knights Templar in Scotland.

The Cross of The Grand Priory of the Scots

There are Masonic degrees named after the Knights Templar but not all Knights Templar Orders are Masonic.

There is no direct connection with the 13th-century presence of Knights Templar in Scotland. However, since the 1980s such a connection has been a popular topic in fiction and in pseudohistorical speculation.

== Early modern history ==
In the seventeenth century, interest in Templarism became political after the execution of Charles I, with the idea that Stuart partisans invented a Templar degree, as the king's death was to be avenged, as was the violent death in 1314 of Jacques de Molay, last Grand Master of the Templars. The story told by Dom Calmet was that Viscount Dundee was supposed to have been an early Templar Grand Master and to have fallen at Killiecrankie wearing the Grand Cross of the Order. The Duke of Mar is then said to have held office, after which time the Templar Order was apparently inactive until its revival by Charles Edward Stuart in 1745. An original letter of the 3rd Duke of Perth to Earl of Airlie Lord Ogilvy shortly after the Jacobite victory at Prestonpans, described a secret ceremony at Holyrood in which the prince was elected Grand Master of the ancient chivalry of the Temple of Jerusalem on Tuesday 24 September 1745.

Templarism experienced a revival of interest in the eighteenth century through Freemasonry with a Scottish influence. The first record of this is in Ramsay's Oration in Paris in 1737. Andrew Michael Ramsay was tutor to the Young Pretender, Prince Charles Edward Stuart. He claimed that Freemasonry had begun among crusader knights and that they had formed themselves into Lodges of St John. The next development was with Karl Gotthelf, Baron Von Hund, and Alten-Grotkau, who had apparently been introduced to the concept by the Jacobite Lord Kilmarnock, and received into a Templar Chapter by a mysterious "Knight of the Red Feather". Baron von Hund established a new Masonic rite called the "Strict Templar Observance". The "Knight of the Red Feather" has been identified subsequently as Alexander Seton better known as Alexander Montgomerie, 10th Earl of Eglinton, a prominent Freemason in the Jacobite movement.

Since the mid nineteenth century myths, legends and anecdotes connecting the Templars to the Battle of Bannockburn have been created. Degrees in Freemasonry, such as the Royal Order of Scotland, allude to the story of Rosslyn and the Scottish Knights Templar. This theme was repeated in the pseudohistory book The Temple and The Lodge by Michael Baigent and Richard Leigh, first published in 1989. On the subject of a possible Bruce connection, Masonic Historian D Murray Lyon wrote "The fraternity of Kilwinning never at any period practiced or acknowledged other than the Craft degrees; neither does there exist any tradition worthy of the name, local or national, nor has any authentic document yet been discovered that can in the remotest degree be held to identify Robert Bruce with the holding of Masonic Courts, or the institution of a secret society at Kilwinning."

== Masonic order ==
The modern revival of Templarism in Scotland starts with Alexander Deuchar. The records of one of Scottish Freemasonry's most prestigious lodges, the St Mary's Chapel Lodge of Edinburgh, describe the visit of a "...deputation from the Grand Assembly of the High Knights Templar in Edinburgh… headed by their most worshipful Grand Master, Alexander Deuchar...the first time for some hundred years that any Lodge of Freemasonry had been visited by an assembly of Knights Templar, headed by their Grand Master." This implies that there was an Order in existence 100 years earlier. In 1811 with a Charter from the Templar Grand Master in England, the Duke of Kent, Alexander Deuchar established the Grand Conclave of Knights of the Holy Temple and Sepulchre, and of St. John of Jerusalem. Controversially in 1836 "...it was proposed that non-Masons be admitted to the Order, at the same time the ritual was adapted in order to allow this to happen. . Previously only Royal Arch Masons in Good Standing were allowed to join. Only the Royal Grand Conclave was allowed to admit non-Masons and these men were never members of any Encampments, only of Grand Conclave." The modern non-Masonic Order Militi Templi Scotia claims descent from Alexander Deuchar who was a Freemason.

The Masonic Movement is generally referred to as the Knights Templar, but the full Style and Title of this body is "The United Religious, Military, and Masonic Orders of the Temple, and of St.John of Jerusalem, Palestine, Rhodes, and Malta".

== Non-Masonic groups ==
There are today a number of smaller Groups of non-Masonic Knights Templar in Scotland, including The Autonomous Grand Priory of Scotland; The Grand Priory of the Knights Templar in Scotland; The OSMTH/SMOTJ International recognized Body in Scotland; The Grand Priory of the Scots; The Confederation of Scottish Knights Templar or the International Federative Alliance; The Ancient Scottish Military Order of Knights Templar and Militi Templi Scotia.

=== OSMTH ===
The cross pattée of The Scottish Knights Templar

In 2006 the "Commandery of St. Clair" No S1, Edinburgh, was chartered by the OSMTH Grand Priory of France. The Commandery recently received affiliation of OSMTH International at Commandery Status under the Mentorship of the Grand Priory of France. Ordo Supremus Militaris Templi Hierosolymitani – The Grand Priory Of The Knights Templar In Scotland Ltd is registered with Companies House in the UK and is working under the authority of The Commandery of St Clair, Edinburgh, No S1, Grand Priory of France (GPFT), OSMTH International.

Knights Templar Internationally use the Cross pattée, including The Commandery of St Clair in alignment with the International Order OSMTH, The Grand Priory of the Scots (mainly American Scots) a Cross with two branches, and other Scottish Knights Templar Groups use the Eight Pointed Cross coloured red more commonly but not exclusively known as the Maltese Cross, of the Knights Hospitaller or Order of St. John or Cross of Amalfi. The Scottish Templar use of the Maltese Cross probably dates to the 1960s although the Cross itself is much older.

The Scottish Knights Templar of OSMTH International have their own tartan. It was ratified and approved by the Grand Conclave of Militi Scotia S.M.O.J in Perth 28 March 1998. The original name was "Scottish Knights Templar of Militi Templi Scotia International." but it was changed to "Scottish Knights Templar of OSMTH International" in 2006. OSMTH stands for; "Ordo Supremus Militaris Templi Hierosolymitani".

== Role in pseudohistory and popular culture ==
The legend that Knight Templars escaped their persecution in Europe and headed for sanctuary in Scotland has pervaded through hundreds of modern pseudohistory publications. Connections between Templarism and Freemasonry have been around for as long but publishers saw a synergy from the 1980s onwards in trying to connect Templarism, Freemasonry, Rosslyn Chapel, Esoteric belief systems and Scotland altogether. A number of key publications that try to tie Templarism, Freemasonry and Scotland together include:

It is discussed in the pseudohistory book The Temple and The Lodge by Michael Baigent and Richard Leigh, first published in 1989. On the subject of a possible Bruce connection, Masonic Historian D Murray Lyon wrote "The fraternity of Kilwinning never at any period practiced or acknowledged other than the Craft degrees; neither does there exist any tradition worthy of the name, local or national, nor has any authentic document yet been discovered that can in the remotest degree be held to identify Robert Bruce with the holding of Masonic Courts, or the institution of a secret society at Kilwinning."

== St Clair – Sinclair speculation ==
According to tradition, William St Clair, (William Sinclair) 3rd Earl of Orkney, Baron of Roslin and 1st Earl of Caithness built Rosslyn Chapel. A later William Sinclair of Roslin became the first Grand Master of the Grand Lodge of Scotland. The St Clair, later Sinclair, Earls of Rosslyn or Roslin have also been connected to Templarism in Scotland, but Mark Oxbrow and Ian Robertson in their recent book, 'Rosslyn and the Grail', note that the St Clair of Rosslyn testified against the Templars at their trial in Edinburgh in 1309. Dr. Louise Yeoman points out that the Rosslyn/Knights Templar connection is false, having been invented by 18th century fiction-writers, and that Rosslyn Chapel was built by William Sinclair so that Mass could be said for the souls of his family. In Michael T.R.B Turnbull's book Rosslyn Chapel Revealed he states that "Eighteen years after the suppression of the Order, Sir William Sainteclaire, in the role of a Crusader(not Templar), made a brave and honourable bid to fulfil the wishes of his late monarch, King Robert The Bruce". He then explains that he and his wife Lady Margaret Ramsay of Dalhousie produced a son (also Sir William) to succeed him as the 8th Baron of Rosslyn. Turnbull States that "His father could never have been a Knight Templar, as his wealth and marriage would have broken two of the three Templar vows – Poverty and chastity".

In 18th century fiction, a connection was made between the Templars and Rosslyn Chapel, built by (William Sinclair, 1st Earl of Caithness. According to Freemason John Yarker, a later William Sinclair of Roslin became the first Grand Master of the Grand Lodge of Scotland. The St Clair, later Sinclair, Earls of Rosslyn or Roslin have also been connected to Templarism in Scotland.

== See also ==
- 1320 Club
- Knights Templar in Scotland
- Rosslyn Chapel
