= Chan Sek Keong =

Singaporean jurist (born 1937)

Dato' Seri Chan Sek Keong SC SPMP DUT DUBC
- 陈锡强
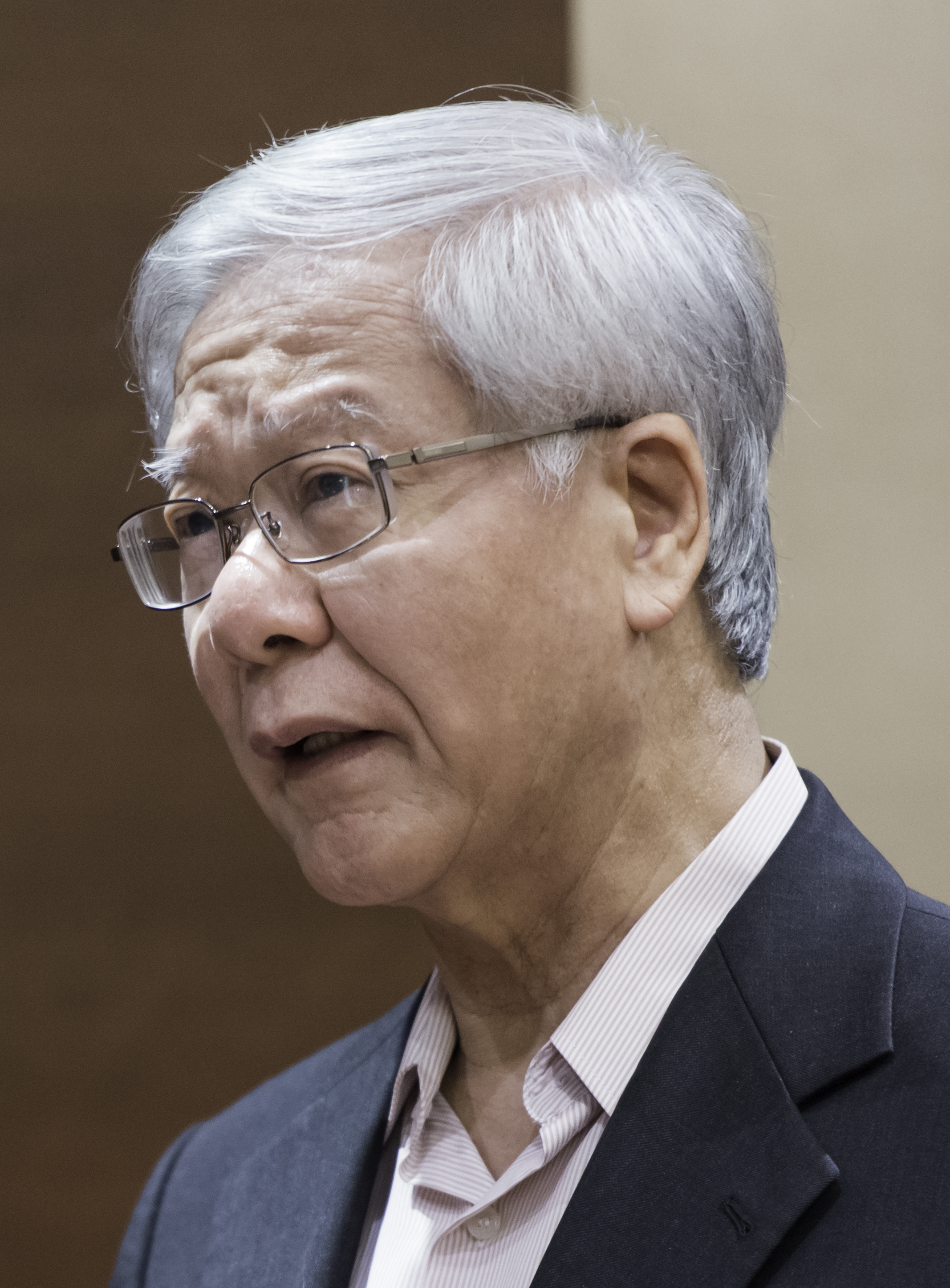
- Chan in 2012

3rd Chief Justice of Singapore
- In office 11 April 2006 – 6 November 2012
- President: S. R. Nathan; Tony Tan
- Preceded by: Yong Pung How
- Succeeded by: Sundaresh Menon

3rd Attorney-General of Singapore
- In office 1 May 1992 – 10 April 2006
- Preceded by: Tan Boon Teik
- Succeeded by: Chao Hick Tin

Judge of the Supreme Court of Singapore
- In office 1 July 1988 – 30 April 1992

Judicial Commissioner of the Supreme Court of Singapore
- In office 1 July 1986 – 30 June 1988

Personal details
- Born: 5 November 1937 (age 88) Ipoh, Perak, Federated Malay States
- Education: National University of Singapore

Chan Sek Keong
- Traditional Chinese: 陳錫強
- Simplified Chinese: 陈锡强
Transcriptions
Standard Mandarin
- Hanyu Pinyin: Chén Xīqiáng
Yue: Cantonese
- Jyutping: Chan1 Sek3 Keung5
Southern Min
- Hokkien POJ: Tân Sek-kiông

Chan Sek Keong SC SPMP DUT DUBC (born 5 November 1937) is a Malayan-born Singaporean jurist who served as chief justice of Singapore between 2006 and 2012 when he was appointed by President S. R. Nathan. He is the first Chief Justice to have previously served as the former & third attorney-general of Singapore between 1992 and 2006.

== Early life and education ==
Chan was born in 1937 in Ipoh, Malaya as the third of five children in an ethnic Chinese family of Cantonese descent. His father was a clerk in the Hong Kong and Shanghai Bank. During World War II, Chan and his family fled from Ipoh to Taiping to live with his grandfather.

Along with his elder brother, Chan received his early education in King Edward VII School in Taiping. When the war ended in 1945, he returned to Ipoh and continued studying at Anderson School. Chan, who was then eight years old, was placed with other children who had missed entering school at the usual age of six years. At the time, Anderson School was the premier government school in Ipoh. In school, he interacted well with students of other ethnicities. In 1955, Chan scored eight distinctions for his Senior Cambridge School Certificate examinations—one of the best in Malaya that year. He was offered a teaching bursary. However, as a teaching career was not what he envisaged, he continued on to the sixth form in hopes of securing a place in a university.

During his second year of the sixth form course, Chan heard from his English literature teacher, Alan Etherton, that a law professor from the University of Malaya would be visiting the school to encourage students in the form to take up a new law course offered by the university. Etherton saw Chan's potential for law and urged him to go for it. Chan, unaware about the career prospects that a law degree could offer, heeded Etherton's advice and went for an interview conducted by Lee Sheridan.

Chan, along with the students, was a member of the inaugural batch of students admitted to the Law Faculty of the University of Malaya in 1957. He graduated in 1961 and began his career with Messrs Bannon & Bailey in Kuala Lumpur as a pupil of Peter Mooney.

== Legal career ==
After working at Messrs Bannon & Bailey for six months, Chan learnt that his law degree was not yet recognised for admission to the bar as the necessary legislation had not been enacted yet. As soon as the legislation was passed, Chan applied to the Bar Council of Malaysia to ask for the period of pupillage he was required to serve to be shortened.

Chan's request was rejected and he petitioned the court against the Bar Council's decision. R. Ramani, a leading advocate and Chairman of the Bar Council, appeared personally to object to Chan's petition on the grounds that he had provided only one reason for abridgment of time when the relevant provision in the legislation referred to "reasons" (or "special grounds", the accurate wording used). Justice H.T. Ong ruled in Chan's favour, holding that the provision should be interpreted to include situations where there was only one reason for reducing the length of a pupillage stint.

After being admitted to the bar on 31 January 1962, Chan practised as a lawyer for a number of years first with Bannon & Bailey in Kuala Lumpur and then Braddell Brothers and then Shook Lin & Bok in Singapore before being appointed the first Judicial Commissioner of Singapore on 1 July 1986. Two years later, he became a Judge of the Supreme Court of Singapore.

In 1992, Chan was appointed Attorney-General. Acting in this capacity in 1997, he submitted an opinion to the Singapore government that although the Parliamentary Elections Act forbade unauthorised persons to loiter within 200 metres of polling stations on polling day, this did not apply to unauthorised persons who were inside the stations. Chan was asked to render this opinion following a complaint by the Workers' Party that during the 1997 general election former People's Action Party Members of Parliament had loitered in polling stations.

Chan relinquished the position of Attorney-General on 11 April 2006 when he was appointed Chief Justice. He retired in 2012, having spent 26 years in legal service.

In October 2019, Chan called for a review of the constitutional validity of Section 377A.

== Academic career ==
In October 2013, he joined the National University of Singapore's Faculty of Law as its first Distinguished Fellow. The term of appointment is on an honorary basis and will be for an initial period of three years. As a Distinguished Fellow, Chan pursued research and writing projects.

== Awards and decorations ==
Chan was conferred the Order of Temasek (Second Class) by the Singapore Government on 9 August 2008 for his outstanding contributions to the team representing Singapore in the Pedra Branca dispute against the Malaysian government before the International Court of Justice (ICJ). In the same month, he became the first Singaporean law graduate to be made an honorary bencher of Lincoln's Inn.

On 21 November 2009, Chan became the first Asian jurist to be given the International Jurists Award in recognition of his outstanding contributions to the administration of justice which, according to International Council of Jurists president Adish Aggarwala, had "enhanced the dignity of the judiciary in Asian countries".

Chan was conferred the state award, Darjah Dato' Seri Paduka Mahkota Perak, which carries the title Dato' Seri, by Azlan Shah, the Sultan of Perak, in 1999.

Legal offices
Preceded by Yong Pung How	Chief Justice of Singapore; 2006–2012	Succeeded by Sundaresh Menon
