= Peter Smith (judge) =

Controversial former English High Court judge

Sir Peter Smith
- Royal coat of arms of the United Kingdom

Justice of the High Court
- In office 15 April 2002 – 28 October 2017

Personal details
- Born: 1 May 1952 (age 74) Taiping, Malaya
- Spouse: Diane Dalgleish
- Children: 3

Sir Peter Winston Smith (born 1 May 1952), abbreviated to Peter Smith J in judgments, is a former High Court judge who sat in the Chancery Division of the High Court of Justice in England and Wales from 5 April 2002 to 27 October 2017. He was the subject of comment and investigation in relation to his judicial behaviour in various circumstances. He retired on 28 October 2017.

== Name and abbreviation ==
Smith's name is correctly abbreviated in English legal writing as "Peter Smith J," and not as "Smith J", as is the norm for High Court judges. This is because there were other senior judges also named Smith.

== Biography ==
Smith was born in Taiping, Malaya, to George Arthur Smith and Iris Muriel Smith, while his father was posted abroad. He grew up with five siblings in Hornsea, East Yorkshire, and attended grammar school in nearby Bridlington.

He read law at Selwyn College, Cambridge. After receiving a BA degree in 1974, promoted in 1976 to an MA by seniority, Smith briefly practised in Liverpool before becoming a law lecturer at Manchester University from 1977 to 1983. He practised as a barrister on the Northern Circuit from 1979 to 2002, being an Assistant Recorder from 1994 to 1997, a Deputy High Court Judge from 1996 to 2002, and a Recorder from 1997 to 2002. Upon his elevation to the High Court bench in 2002, he was knighted as a matter of course.

In 1980, Smith married Diane Dalgleish. They have one son and two daughters.

Smith is a member of the Titanic Historical Society and the British Titanic Society. Other hobbies include being a "Jackie Fisher fan", reading military history, and football. He currently resides in London.

== Controversial cases ==
=== Baigent and Leigh v The Random House Group Ltd (2006) ===
In April 2006, Michael Baigent and Richard Leigh, authors of the pseudo-historical book The Holy Blood and the Holy Grail, sued Dan Brown, author of the book The Da Vinci Code, alleging Brown had copied them. Smith ruled that Dan Brown had not infringed the copyright. While Brown had taken ideas from the earlier book, he did not copy the "central theme" of his book from there. As ideas themselves cannot be the subject of copyright, Smith ruled that Brown had not substantially copied the original work.

==== The 'Smithy Code' ====
Within his printed judgment, which was delivered on 7 April 2006, the judge embedded a coded message, apparently placed for amusement. The first few pages contained scattered letters which were italicised. The first section spelled 'smithy code', followed by a number of other seemingly random letters. The judge stated that he would not discuss the code as he was not able to talk about his ruling, but that he would confirm any correct attempt to break it.

It later transpired that the judge gave a series of email hints about the code, which was finally announced as "cracked" on 28 April 2006, by Daniel Tench, a lawyer and media journalist for The Guardian newspaper. The plain text reads: "Smithy Code. Jackie Fisher, who are you? Dreadnought." This is related to the subject of one of Smith's personal interests, John Fisher, 1st Baron Fisher, who was responsible for the design of the battleship HMS Dreadnought (1906). The ship was launched in February 1906, roughly 100 years before the start of the trial.

In the appeal to the Court of Appeal from the judge's decision in "The Da Vinci Code" case, the Court of Appeal said that:

[Smith] was prompted by the extensive use in The Da Vinci Code of codes, and no doubt by his own interest in such things, to incorporate a coded message in his judgment, on which nothing turns. The judgment is not easy to read or to understand. It might have been preferable for him to have allowed himself more time for the preparation, checking, and revision of the judgment.

=== Failure to recuse in Howell v Millais (2007) ===
In 2007, Smith spent some months in communication with a London solicitors' firm, Addleshaw Goddard, relating to the possibility of employment by them. Those discussions came to nothing, and there was email correspondence showing his disappointment.

However, in July 2007, about a month after the conclusion of those negotiations, the judge refused to recuse himself from a heavily contested case, Howell v Lees Millais & Others, involving a partner in the same firm in his capacity as a trustee.

==== Criticism from the Court of Appeal ====
On appeal from his refusal, the Court of Appeal criticised the judge for his attitude and behaviour during the hearing and allowed the appeal, with the effect of removing Smith from the case.

In its unanimous judgments of 4 July 2007, the Court of Appeal described the judge's behaviour in part as "intemperate" and "somewhat extraordinary". In one paragraph of his judgment, Lord Justice Judge said:

It is the conduct of the hearing which underlines that the judge had become too personally involved in the decision he was being asked to make to guarantee the necessary judicial objectivity which would be required in the trustee proceedings. I identify three particular features. First, the witness who supported the application was in effect cross-examined by the judge in something of the style of an advocate instructed to oppose the application. Second, the submission by counsel for the applicant that the judge had given evidence was, in the circumstances, unsurprising, and the concerns he expressed on this topic were validly made. Finally, the judge impugned the good faith of the application, a conclusion repeated in the strongest terms in his judgment when there is no shred of evidence to suggest some ulterior or improper motive behind the application.

In a concluding comment on the way in which the judge behaved, Lord Justice Judge said:

In these circumstances, it is unfortunate to have to record that, in my judgment, the conduct of the hearing itself demonstrated not only that the application to the judge to recuse himself was rightly made, but that it should have been granted.

The judge himself then issued a press release on the topic. By 13 July 2007, Joshua Rozenberg, a legal journalist, was suggesting in The Daily Telegraph that it was time for the judge to stand down.

==== Investigation by the OJC ====
On 16 July 2007, it was announced in a press release from the Judicial Communications Office that the Lord Chief Justice of England and Wales, Lord Phillips of Worth Matravers, had referred the judge's behaviour in the case to the independent Office for Judicial Complaints (OJC). Frances Gibb embarked on speculation as to whether the judge should stay in office in The Times on 18 July, and Rozenberg returned to the point on 19 July. Both journalists mentioned the question of the judge's health, but without going into detail.

The Lord Chief Justice and the Lord Chancellor may refer for investigation by the OJC any matter where the conduct of a judicial office holder may warrant disciplinary proceedings. They may make this referral irrespective of whether there have been any complaints made by others. The Office for Judicial Complaints is obliged to consider the matter in accordance with the relevant statutory regulations.

On 18 April 2008, it was announced in the following terms that the OJC had found that misconduct had been established against the judge.

Following investigation under the Judicial Discipline Regulations 2006, the Lord Chancellor and the Lord Chief Justice have carefully considered the Court of Appeal’s comments on the conduct of Mr Justice Peter Smith in the case of Howell and others v Lees-Millais and others and have concluded that the conduct in question amounted to misconduct.

As a result, the Lord Chief Justice has issued a reprimand to the judge.

The Lord Chief Justice has said: "I consider that a firm line has now been drawn under this matter. The Lord Chancellor and I value the services of Mr Justice Peter Smith, and he has my full confidence."

No statement was made by the judge.

=== Failure to recuse in Mengiste v Endowment Fund for the Rehabilitation of Tigray ===
Smith was involved in another recusal controversy 5 years later. In August 2013, the Court of Appeal held that Smith should have recused himself from hearing an application for wasted costs against a firm of solicitors. Smith had made strong criticisms of the quality of the evidence of an expert witness called to give evidence of Ethiopian law, and had attributed the cause of the expert's failings to solicitors who, according to Smith, had failed to prepare the expert appropriately for the trial.

Smith declined to recuse himself from hearing the subsequent wasted costs application against the solicitors, but an appeal against this decision was allowed by the Court of Appeal. Lady Justice Arden observed in her judgment at paragraph 59 that there was 'apparent bias stemming from the facts of the case which meant that the judge should have recused himself from hearing the wasted costs application' and at paragraph 62, that 'the judge should certainly have recused himself from hearing the wasted costs application.'

=== Recusal in Emerald Supply Ltd v British Airways ===
In July 2015, on application by the parties, Smith recused himself from being the judge in long running multi-party proceedings between various airlines.

The judge's personal luggage, together with that of other passengers, had failed to arrive in London after a flight from Florence. Smith corresponded with the chief executive of British Airways (BA), suggesting that BA may have taken a deliberate decision not to carry the passengers' luggage and that this may have been in order to make additional profit from the conveyance of cargo on that flight. A number of the parties to the litigation applied for Smith to recuse himself from further participation in the case.

During the hearing, Smith repeatedly asked counsel for BA what had happened to his luggage, receiving the response that the proceedings were not appropriate for dealing with a personal dispute. In due course, Smith agreed to recuse himself. In his judgment of 22 July 2015 he set out a detailed account of the occasion when the luggage went missing, and suggested that the true issue in the case was that the missing luggage gave rise to issues which were similar to some of the allegations in the case which he had to try, so that (if they were correct) he would have had to recuse himself. He said that he would continue his investigation into the luggage issue "in a private capacity... with the vigour for which I am known".

In September 2015, it was announced by a spokesman for the Judicial Conduct Investigations Office that Smith's conduct in connection with the case was being investigated.

=== Biases in Harb v Aziz ===
Following the British Airways recusal application, an article by Lord Pannick QC appeared in The Times newspaper. It was highly critical of Smith's behaviour. Smith's reaction was to write to Anthony Peto QC, one of the joint heads of Blackstone Chambers, where Pannick practised, complaining in strong terms about Pannick's "outrageous" article and saying that Smith would no longer support members of Blackstone Chambers.

At around the same time, Smith was hearing a case (Harb v Aziz) where one party was represented by Ian Mill QC and by Shaheed Fatima QC, each a member of Blackstone Chambers. Smith decided against the client of Mill and Fatima. One of the grounds of an appeal to the Court of Appeal was that Smith had shown apparent bias against their client by reason of his expressed animus against all the members of Blackstone Chambers.

==== Appeal ====
The appeal was allowed by the Court of Appeal, not on the grounds of bias but because the judge had failed to deal adequately with the case, including certain aspects of the evidence. However, in the course of the judgment of the Court (Lord Dyson MR, Moore-Bick and McFarlane LJJ), Smith was heavily criticised for his conduct in writing the letter.

Having set out substantially the whole of Pannick's article and the text of the letter written by Smith to Peto, the court said (at paragraph [68]):

In his letter to the claimant's solicitors dated 12 February 2016, the judge accepted that he should not have written the Letter. It is difficult to believe that any judge, still less a High Court Judge, could have done so. It was a shocking and, we regret to say, disgraceful letter to write. It shows a deeply worrying and fundamental lack of understanding of the proper role of a judge. What makes it worse is that it comes on the heels of the BAA baggage affair. In our view, the comments of Lord Pannick, far from being "outrageous" as the judge said in the Letter, were justified. We greatly regret having to criticise a judge in these strong terms, but our duty requires us to do so.

== Criticism in the media ==
In a column in the Guardian newspaper, Joshua Rozenberg returned to the theme of Smith's suitability for judicial office, repeating his contention, first raised in 2007, that it was now time for Smith to resign. Smith had "agreed to refrain from sitting" before the Harb appeal, and this effective suspension from work was to continue.

On 2 August 2016, writing in The Times, Frances Gibb reported that Smith had "been signed off sick and may never return to work", being mentally unfit to defend himself in a disciplinary inquiry, which could mean that a decision may not be made for several months. A spokesman for the Judicial Conduct Investigations Office was reported as having said, "The JCIO investigation into the BA matter is continuing." A separate inquiry relating to the Harb appeal was under way. He would not confirm whether the judge was unwell.

On 11 April 2017, Joshua Rozenberg returned to the topic of Smith's continued holding of judicial office. Rozenberg speculated that Smith would retire from the High Court once he attained 65 years of age in May 2017, qualifying for immediate payment of his judicial pension.

On 2 October 2017, Rozenberg reported that a formal disciplinary tribunal was due to sit in private at the end of October 2017 in order to hear unspecified allegations against Smith, who had been effectively suspended on full pay since May 2016. Rozenberg drew attention to the fact that it had been over 10 years since he had first called for Smith's resignation.

Smith's retirement, with effect from 28 October 2017, was announced on 27 October 2017.
