= J. Martin Hunter =

British lawyer (1937–2021)

- Born: 1937; London, England
- Died: 9 October 2021 (aged 84)
- Occupations: Solicitor, academic
- Known for: Specialist in international arbitration

J. Martin Hunter (1937 – 9 October 2021) was a British solicitor specializing in arbitration. He was an emeritus professor at Nottingham Trent University and was a visiting lecturer, fellow or professor at various universities around the world. He died on 9 October 2021.

== Early years ==
J. Martin Hunter was born in London in 1937. He attended The Pilgrims' School, Winchester from 1946 to 1950, then the Shrewsbury School from 1950 to 1955. He did his National Military Service from 1955 to 1957, then studied at Pembroke College, Cambridge from 1957 to 1960. He graduated from the University of Cambridge with a BA (Law) in 1960.

== Legal career ==
From 1961 to 1963, Hunter was an articled clerk at Freshfields Bruckhaus Deringer. He studied at the College of Law, London from 1963 to 1964. He became an associate at Freshfields in 1964 and a partner in 1967. He became a member of the International Bar Association in 1967.

From 1967, Hunter specialized in international arbitration. He was the sole arbitrator, the chair or a member of the tribunal in many international arbitration proceedings, under the Rules of the AAA, CAS, ICC, LCIA, NAFTA, NAI, SIAC, and UNCITRAL. In 1980 he became a fellow and chartered arbitrator with the Chartered Institute of Arbitrators. From 1986 to 1989 he was chairman of the International Chamber of Commerce Commission’s Working Group on Dissenting Opinions and Interim and Partial Awards. He became a member of the governing board of the International Council for Commercial Arbitration in 1988. From 1990 to 1996 he was Vice-Chairman of the UK Department of Trade and Industry committee on arbitration law.

Hunter left Freshfields in 1994 and became a Barrister at Essex Court Chambers. From 2004 he was chairman of the Dubai International Arbitration Centre’s Board of Trustees. In 2009 Lord Phillips of Worth Matravers presented an ICJ award to Professor J. Martin Hunter at an International Council of Jurists ceremony in London.

== Academic career ==
J. Martin Hunter was an honorary fellow at the Faculty of Law, University of Edinburgh from 1992 to 2000. In 1995, he became professor of international dispute resolution at Nottingham Trent University. He was a visiting lecturer at Harvard Law School in 1997, at Deakin University in Melbourne, Australia in 2003 and at Columbia University, New York, also in 2003. He was a visiting professor at Victoria University of Wellington, New Zealand in 1999. From 2003 he was a visiting fellow at the University of Cologne Summer Academy and a visiting professor at King's College London. In 2007 he became a member of the advisory board and a visiting lecturer at KIIT School of Law in Bhubaneswar, India. From 2009 he was a visiting professor at Central European University, and from 2010 emeritus professor at Nottingham Trent University.

== Publications ==
Publications include:

- Martin Hunter; Philip Croall (1985–2000), "Arbitration and Alternative Dispute Resolution Title", Encyclopaedia of Forms and Precedents, Butterworths
- Martin Hunter (1993), Freshfields (Firm) (ed.), The Freshfields Guide to Arbitration and ADR Clauses in International Contracts, Springer Netherlands, ISBN 978-90-6544-675-6
- Martin Hunter (1995), The internationalisation of international arbitration: the LCIA Centenary Conference, Graham & Trotman
- Martin Hunter (1995), "Reflections on Advocacy and the Art of Persuasion", The Litigator: 275
- Co-author, Hunter and Landau, The English Arbitration Act 1996: Text and Notes, in English, Français, Deutsch, Español (Kluwer, 1998)
- Martin Hunter (2000), "International Commercial Dispute Resolution: The Challenge of the Twenty-First Century", LCIA Arbitration International, 16 (4): 379, doi:10.1093/arbitration/16.4.379
- Martin Hunter; Gui Conde e Silva (2003), "Transnational Public Policy and its Application in Investment Arbitrations", The Journal of World Investment, 3: 367
- Martin Hunter; Ben Pilling (2003), "Arbitration Title", Halsbury's Laws, Butterworths
- Martin Hunter; Anthony Sinclair (2005), Todd Weiler (ed.), Aminoil Revisited: Reflections on a Story of Changing Circumstances", International Investment Law and Arbitration in Leading Cases from the ICSID, NAFTA, Bilateral Treaties and Customary International Law, p. 347
- Martin Hunter (2006), Techniques for Eliciting Expert Testimony: Expert Conferencing and New Methods (presentations to 18th ICCA Congress, Montreal)
- Martin Hunter; Alexei Barbuk (2008), "Reflections on the Definition of an Investment", Liber Amicorum in honor of Robert Briner
- Nigel Blackaby; Constantine Partasides; Alan Redfern; Martin Hunter (20 December 2009), Redfern and Hunter on international arbitration, Oxford University Press, ISBN 978-0-19-955719-6
- J. Martin Hunter (2018), Arbitration in India, Kluwer Law International, ISBN 978-90-411-8255-5
