= The Keltiad =

Body of fantasy novels and short stories

The Keltiad is a body of epic fantasy works written by Patricia Kennealy-Morrison, consisting of eight novels and one collection of short stories.

The books are set in a star system far from our own, where various Celtic peoples emigrated after the rise of Christianity and the purge of the Old Religion that followed. The novels and short stories are based upon traditional Celtic legends and mythology, specifically those of Ireland, along with elements of Arthurian lore, woven into a technologically advanced universe, and updated for a futuristic culture.

Several other titles were planned, but when in 2007 publisher HarperCollins decided to drop the series, Kennealy-Morrison was forced to curtail it. The author then made known her plans to continue the series with at least two more titles – The Beltane Queen and The Cloak of Gold, the conclusion of the series – to be published by her own Lizard Queen Press, plus, depending on reader response, possibly several more. At the time of her death in 2021 neither of these had been published.

== The Tales of Aeron ==
=== The Copper Crown ===
The Copper Crown introduces us to the technologically advanced, interstellar kingdom of Keltia, founded in Earth year 452 by Celts from Earth. As the book opens, in Earth year 3512, Aeron Aoibhell is Ard-rian (High Queen) of Keltia. Earth has finally discovered its faraway and long-sundered kinfolk, but any possible alliance/treaty with the Terran Federacy could result in war with Keltia’s fiercest rivals, the Phalanx and the Cabiri Empire.

=== The Throne of Scone ===
The Throne of Scone continues directly on from The Copper Crown. Aeron finds unlikely friends and allies on her quest for the long-lost Thirteen Treasures of Keltia, and for the Once and Future King, Arthur of Arvon. As in The Copper Crown, Aeron faces the challenge of liberating her kingdom and her people without giving in to the call of unlawful magic. (Patricia Kennealy; hc 1986; pb 1987)

=== The Silver Branch ===
The Silver Branch, the prequel to The Copper Crown, begins with Aeron’s father, King Fionnbarr, whose accidental love-affair affects both Keltia and Fomor. Aeron grows up, is educated as a Fian (warrior) and a Ban-draoi (female druid) and faces personal and political challenges before the arrival of the Terrans in Keltia. She develops a strong friendship with Morwen Douglas and love affairs with both Roderick Douglas (Morwen's elder brother) and Gwydion, Prince of Gwynedd, before conflict with Arianiera (Gwydion's twin sister) ultimately causes Keltia's downfall. The novel reveals why she fears her own powers, and why Bres, King of Fomor is obsessed with revenge for an act committed over 30 years prior. (Patricia Kennealy; hc 1988; pb 1989)

== The Tales of Arthur ==
This trilogy is told in the first person. "The greatest bard of all time," Taliesin Glyndour, narrates.

=== The Hawk's Gray Feather ===
In The Hawk’s Gray Feather Taliesin recounts his youth on the planet Gwynedd, and the beginnings of his lifelong friendship with Arthur of Arvon, destined to be the greatest king in both Keltic (and later Earth) history. At this time, approximately present-day in Earthtime, the throne of Keltia has been usurped by the evil wizard known as the Marbh-draoi. As the Kelts suffer under his rule, the rebellious Counterinsurgency fights to put the true monarch back on the Throne of Scone. Arthur and Talyn (young Taliesin) are protected from the Marbh-Draoi Ederyn by the legendary Merlyn Llywd. Their home cities are destroyed in an attempt to end their lives, but they escape to reach adulthood and challenge the Marbh-draoi's hold on Keltia. (Patricia Kennealy; hc 1990; pb 1991)

=== The Oak Above the Kings ===
The Oak above the Kings continues from the previous book. The rightful ruler is restored, but other threats rear their heads, including enemies of "the most dangerous sort - those reared out of heart’s blood". Taliesin and Arthur have both married by now, and their choices of mate are fateful for Keltia as well for them personally. (Patricia Kennealy-Morrison; hc 1994; pb 1995)

=== The Hedge of Mist ===
The Hedge of Mist concludes the Arthurian trilogy with a unique Grail quest and an epic battle to reclaim the soul of Keltia. Marguessan, Arthur’s evil sister, attempts to seize the Throne of Scone, while Morgan Magistra, her twin, wife of Taliesin and the mightiest sorceress of Keltia, struggles to restore the balance of Darkness and Light. (Patricia Kennealy-Morrison; hc 1996; pb 1997)

== Stand-alone novels of The Keltiad ==
=== Blackmantle ===
Blackmantle is the story of Athyn Cahanagh, who, by prowess in battle and the people's acclaim, rises from humble origins to be High Queen of Keltia. When she loses her husband and king, the legendary bard Morric Douglas, through deception and treachery, Athyn rides out to seek vengeance from those who betrayed Morric to his death, and then, with the assistance of the Sidhe lord Allyn, to the Otherworld of Annwn to try to rescue her beloved from Arawn, the god of death and fate. As in the tales of Aeron, there is the central question of whether having the ability to change fate means it is acceptable, and what the penalties for such karmic upheavals may be. (Patricia Kennealy-Morrison; hc 1997; pb 1998)

=== The Deer's Cry ===
The Deer’s Cry is the story of the founding of Keltia. In fifth-century Ireland, Brendan Aoibhell is the son of a Sidhe princess and a mortal chieftain. When his heritage, his religion and his culture are all threatened by the onset of the “New Religion” of Christianity, brought to his homeland by the fanatic missionary monk Padraic, he and those like him seek shelter in a faraway home that only one among them, the last survivor of Atlantis, has seen before - a home among the stars, which will be known as Keltia. Their search for a new home is guided by the Sidhe magic of Brendan's mother, Nia the Golden. On the journey the future Kelts meet other space-faring races, some to be friends and some to be enemies of the future Keltic Six Nations. (Patricia Kennealy-Morrison; hc 1998; pb 1999)

== Short story collection ==
=== Tales of Spiral Castle: Stories of the Keltiad ===
Four short stories, taking place mostly in the time frame of the Aeron books.

The Last Voyage: a crossover between the Keltiad and the Knights Templar. Taking place in the year 1307, this story recounts a fictional rescue and disappearance of the Templar fleet by a Keltic starship that happens to be in the neighborhood. Sir James Douglas, the historical "Black Douglas", is posited to be a Templar and taken aboard the starship. There he meets the captain, Connla mac Nessa, and is informed of the existence of Keltia; he and his men must decide whether to take the captain's offer of sanctuary there or to remain on Earth. This story also appeared in Katherine Kurtz's 2002 anthology, Crusade of Fire, stories about the Knights Templar.

Touchstone: Aeron Aoibhell as a child, being tested for magic, and what comes of it. The story introduces Gwyn ap Neith, king of the Sidhefolk, and his wife Etain, as important and recurring characters.

Alembic: Gwydion Prince of Gwynedd, as a youth studying to be a Druid, and his own testing in the labyrinth of Glaston Tor. Gwyn and Etain appear here as well.

Crucible: Terran lieutenant and explorer Sarah O'Reilly arrives in Keltia with the Earth ship Sword, just prior to the action of The Copper Crown. She quickly falls in love with all things Keltic, and has an encounter of her own with Gwyn and Etain.

== Varietum ==
The author's legal name is "Patricia Kennealy Morrison". As a rock critic and editor, in the beginning of her career, she published under her birth name, "Patricia Kennely", and later as "Patricia Kennealy". Since 1994 her fantasy books have been published as "Patricia Kennealy-Morrison", with the hyphen, while her murder mystery series "The Rennie Stride Mysteries" is credited to "Patricia Morrison".
