= Office for Judicial Complaints =

The Office for Judicial Complaints (OJC) was an office within the Ministry of Justice which, between 2004 and 2013, managed the handling of complaints against the judiciary of England and Wales. On 1 October 2013 it was replaced by the Judicial Conduct Investigations Office.

The OJC also assisted in the handling of complaints against the judiciary of Scotland between 2004 and 2011, when the Judicial Complaints Reviewer was introduced.

== Origin ==
The OJC was created in 2004 as part of the Labour government's programme of constitutional reform. It existed to support the Lord Chancellor and Lord Chief Justice (and the Lord President of the Court of Session in respect of Scotland) consider and decide upon complaints against members of the judiciary. The judicial discipline arrangements, under which the Lord Chancellor and Lord Chief Justice/Lord President handle complaints and disciplinary action, were established by Part 4 the Constitutional Reform Act 2005.

== Investigation of complaints ==
Complaints about the conduct of judges or magistrates were not investigated by the civil servants who made up the Office for Judicial Complaints. Once the OJC had determined that the complaint needed investigation, a preliminary investigation was conducted by a nominated judge who reports to the Lord Chancellor and the Lord Chief Justice. If a further, more detailed, investigation is required, this was carried out by an investigating judge. Any disciplinary action required was taken by the Lord Chancellor and the Lord Chief Justice.

== High-profile cases ==
=== Cherie Booth QC ===
On 23 January 2010 Cherie Booth QC, wife of Tony Blair (who until recently had been Prime Minister of the United Kingdom), was sitting as a recorder in a case where a man was found guilty violent assault in which he broke another man's jaw in a queue in a bank. Ms Booth gave the man a suspended sentence, rather than a jail term, saying that he was a "religious person" who had not been in trouble before. A number of complaints were made to the Office for Judicial Complaints pointing out that under English law everyone is equal under the law and individual religious beliefs cannot be reasons for the guilty to be given privileged treatment. On 10 June 2010 the OJC issued a statement saying that the investigation had found that "Recorder Booth’s observations did not constitute judicial misconduct".

=== Judge Trigger ===
On 18 May 2010, the OJC issued a statement reporting that, following investigation, the Lord Chief Justice had given Judge Trigger 'formal advice' following comments he made whilst passing sentence in a case in July 2009. He had said to the defendant that "your case illustrates all too clearly the completely lax immigration policy that exists and has existed over recent years in this country. People like you, and there are literally hundreds and hundreds of thousands of people like you, come to these shores from foreign countries to avail themselves of the generous welfare benefits that exist here." The comments were found to be an "inappropriate judicial intervention in the political process".

=== Justice Peter Smith ===
Justice Peter Smith was given a formal reprimand by the Lord Chief Justice following behaviour which the Court of Appeal strongly criticised as "extraordinary", "intemperate" and "regrettable". The judge, who had failed to gain a position with the law firm Addleshaw Goddard, refused to stand down from hearing a case in which a partner in the firm was a party. The Court of Appeal had concluded that "the approach adopted by the judge ... provides strong support for [counsel]'s submissions that the fair-minded and informed observer, having considered the facts, would conclude that there was a real possibility that the judge was biased against Addleshaw Goddard and its partners, one of whom is the first claimant".
