= Robert Nye =

English poet and author

- Born: March 15, 1939; London, England
- Died: July 2, 2016 (aged 77); Cork, Ireland
- Education: Southend High School for Boys
- Occupation: Novelist
- Spouse: Judith Pratt
- Writing career
- Genres: Poetry; Historical fiction

Robert Nye FRSL (15 March 1939 – 2 July 2016) was an English poet and author. His bestselling novel Falstaff, published in 1976, was described by Michael Ratcliffe (writing in The Times) as "one of the most ambitious and seductive novels of the decade", and went on to win both The Hawthornden Prize and Guardian Fiction Prize. The novel was also included in Anthony Burgess's 99 Novels: The Best in English Since 1939 (1984).

== Early life ==
Robert Nye was born in London in 1939. His father was a civil servant, his mother a farmer's daughter. He attended Southend High School for Boys and had published his first poem, "Kingfisher", in the London Magazine (September 1955; Volume 2, Number 9) by the age of sixteen. He left school in 1955 and did not pursue additional formal study. Nye's poetry has appeared in a number of important literary magazines, including The Atlantic Monthly, Encounter and The Listener. The 1964 Fall and Winter issues of the Canadian publication The Fiddlehead contained respectively fifteen and eighteen of his poems. He was a conscientious objector during National Service, c 1957–59, and was given exemption from military service conditional upon joining the Friends' Ambulance Unit and serving as a medical orderly at St Wulstan's Sanatorium, near Malvern, and then at Rochford General Hospital in Essex. At other times between 1955 and 1961 he worked at a variety of jobs: newspaper reporter, milkman, postman and labourer in a market garden. Nye married his first wife, Judith Pratt, in 1959. In 1961 they moved to a remote cottage in north Wales, where Nye devoted himself full-time to writing. There he developed an interest in Welsh and Celtic legends, reflected later in his fiction for both adults and children.

== Writing career ==
His first book, Juvenilia 1 (1961), was a collection of poems. A second volume, Juvenilia 2 (1963), won the Eric Gregory Award. Both volumes were enthusiastically received and Martin Seymour-Smith described Nye as showing a "precocity unique in this century". This view was supported by G. S. Fraser, who in an article in The Times Literary Supplement convincingly established an affinity between Nye's early poetry and that of Robert Graves. To support his continuance as a poet, Nye began to contribute reviews to British literary journals and newspapers. He became the poetry editor for The Scotsman in 1967, and served as poetry critic of The Times from 1971 to 1996, while also contributing regular reviews of new fiction to The Guardian.

Nye started writing stories for children to entertain his three young sons. His children's novel Taliesin and a collection of stories called March Has Horse's Ears were published by Faber and Faber in 1966. When Nye published his first adult novel, Doubtfire (1967), it was described by P. J. Kavanagh as "breathless" and "brilliant"; Kavanagh also referred to the author's "love affair with rhythms and language". That same year Nye divorced his first wife. A year later he married Aileen Campbell, an artist, graduate of Glasgow School of Art, subsequently an analytical psychologist (diploma C. G. Jung Institute in Zürich). She provided the illustrations for Bee Hunter: Adventures of Beowulf and was an inspiration for some of Nye's most personal poetry of the time (notably "In More's Hotel"). Campbell also designed the masks used in the 1973 performance of one of the author's more unusual projects, The Seven Deadly Sins (1974). The two moved to Edinburgh, where they lived until 1977. She has also had poetry published in Arts Council anthologies and other journals, also in Antonia Fraser's Scottish Love Poems.

Nye's next publication after Doubtfire was a return to children's literature, a freewheeling version of Beowulf that has remained in print in many editions since 1968. In 1970, Nye published another children's book, Wishing Gold, and received the James Kennaway Memorial Award for his collection of short stories, Tales I Told My Mother (1969).

During the early 1970s Nye wrote several plays for BBC radio, including A Bloody Stupid Hole (1970), Reynolds, Reynolds (1971), and a version of Penthesilea by Heinrich von Kleist (1971). He was also commissioned by Covent Garden Opera House to write an unpublished libretto for Harrison Birtwistle's opera, Kronia (1970). Nye held the position of writer in residence at the University of Edinburgh, 1976–1977, during which time he received the Guardian Fiction Prize, followed by the 1976 Hawthornden Prize for his novel Falstaff.

1978 saw the publication of Nye's Merlin excursion into the Matter of Britain. In 1990 Nye's novel The Life and Death of My Lord Gilles de Rais was published by Hamish Hamilton and is considered by many to be the author's masterpiece. The novel reportedly took only sixty days to write but represented the author's final release from a 35-year obsession with the story of Joan of Arc and her first Marshal of France. The seeds of the book can be found in the poem The Mystery of the Siege of Orleans first published in 1961 and in Nye's first novel Doubtfire. Allan Massie reviewing the novel for The Scotsman concluded that "The Life and Death of My Lord Gilles de Rais is a work of learning, wit and humanity....its understanding of depravity is extraordinary, the judgement impeccable...It is I think, the book he has worked all his life to write, and it is perfectly done; yes indeed a masterpiece."

Robert Nye continued to write poetry, publishing Darker Ends (1969), which launched Calder and Boyars' "Signature Series", later to include such authors as Samuel Beckett and Edward Dahlberg, and Divisions on a Ground (1976), and to prepare editions of other poets with whose work he felt an affinity: Sir Walter Ralegh, William Barnes, and Laura Riding. Nye's own Collected Poems appeared in 1995. His selected poems, entitled The Rain and The Glass, published in 2005, won the Cholmondeley Award. His final collection, An Almost Dancer, appeared in 2012. He lived from 1977 in County Cork. Although his novels have won prizes and been translated into many languages, it is as a poet that he would probably prefer to be remembered. The critic Gabriel Josipovici described Nye as "one of the most interesting poets writing today, with a voice unlike that of any of his contemporaries."

== Selected works ==
=== Poetry ===
- Juvenilia 1 (1961)
- Juvenilia 2 (1963)
- Darker Ends (1969)
- Two Prayers (1973)
- Agnus Dei (1973)
- Five Dreams (1973)
- Divisions on a Ground (1976)
- A Collection of Poems 1955 - 1988 (1989)
- 14 Poemes (1994)
- Henry James and Other Poems (1995)
- Collected Poems (1996)
- 16 Poems (2005)
- The Rain and the Glass: 99 Poems, New and Selected (2005)
- An Almost Dancer: Poems 2005-11 (2012)

=== Novels ===
- Doubtfire (1967)
- Falstaff (1976)
- Merlin (UK: Hamish Hamilton, 1978) (US: Putnam, 1979)
- Faust (1980)
- The Voyage of the Destiny (1982)
- The Memoirs of Lord Byron (1989)
- The Life and Death of My Lord Gilles de Rais (1990)
- Mrs. Shakespeare: The Complete Works (1993)
- The Late Mr Shakespeare (1998)

=== Story collections ===
- Tales I Told My Mother (1969)
- Cricket (1975)
- The Facts of Life and Other Fictions (1983)

=== Stories for children ===
- March Has Horse's Ears (1966)
- Taliesin (1966)
- Beowulf: A New Telling (original UK title Bee Hunter: Adventures of Beowulf) (1968)
- Wishing Gold (1970)
- Poor Pumpkin (1971) - Illustrated by Derek Collard
- Once Upon Three Times (1978)
- The Bird of the Golden Land (1980)
- Harry Pay the Pirate (1981)
- Lord Fox and Other Spine-Chilling Tales (1997)

=== Plays ===
- Sawney Bean [with Bill Watson] (1970)
- The Seven Deadly Sins, A Mask (1974)
- Penthesilea, Fugue, and Sisters (1976)

=== Editions ===
- A Choice of Sir Walter Ralegh's Verse (1972)
- William Barnes, Selected Poems (1973)
- A Choice of Swinburne's Verse (1973)
- The Faber Book of Sonnets (1976)
- The English Sermon 1750-1850 (1976)
- PEN New Poetry 1 (1986)
- First Awakenings: The Early Poems of Laura Riding (1992)
- A Selection of the Poems of Laura Riding (1994)
- Some Poems by Ernest Dowson (2006)
- Some Poems by Thomas Chatterton (2008)
- Some Poems by Clere Parsons (2008)
- The Liquid Rhinoceros and Other Uncollected Poems by Martin Seymour-Smith (2009)
- Some Poems by James Reeves (2009)
