= International Council of Jurists =

Council of Justices around the world

- Abbreviation: ICJ
- Formation: 2007; 19 years ago
- Founder: Adish Aggarwala
- Type: Limited company
- Headquarters: 134, Buckingham Palace Road, London, England
- Coordinates: 51.494288°N 0.147062°W
- Region served: Global
- President: Adish Aggarwala
- Co-President: Awn Al-Khasawneh
- Co-President: K. G. Balakrishnan
- Website: internationaljurist.org internationaljurists.org

The International Council of Jurists (Note: The International Council of Jurists founded in 2007 is not to be confused with the former International Council of Jurists active in the 1960s with its headquarters in Geneva, an NGO with the power of an advisory committee of the United Nations with members from over 60 countries.) (ICJ) is a company based in London, England that organizes seminars and conferences in London and India, and gives out awards. It charges fees for membership, conference sponsorship and advertising. In April 2020 its president, Adish Aggarwala, launched a conspiracy theory in which he claimed the Chinese had deliberately launched the COVID-19 pandemic to further its ambitions to become a superpower.

== Status ==
The International Council of Jurists (ICJ) is made up of jurists from different countries. It is engaged in research, and has arranged conferences and seminars on subjects such as human rights and constitutional duties. The president, Adish Aggarwala, is designated Senior Advocate in India, and he is co-author of a coffee-table book titled Narendra Modi: A Charismatic & Visionary Statesman, with a foreword by Union Home Minister Amit Shah.

The International Council of Jurists was incorporated on 23 October 2007 and is registered as Company Number 06407095 at the Companies House. It is "private limited by guarantee without share capital, use of 'Limited' exemption". The office address was given as 134 Buckingham Palace Road, London, SW1W 9SA. The ultimate beneficial owner is Mr Kumar Amit. The company charges fees for membership, conference sponsorship and advertising.

== Activities ==
=== 2009 ===
In 2009 at an ICJ ceremony in London Lord Phillips of Worth Matravers presented Bird & Bird with an award as "Global Law Firm of the Year 2009 – An International Firm with substantive local legal expertise". Awards were also given to K. G. Balakrishnan, Chief Justice of India, Dominic Grieve, the UK Shadow Minister of Justice, Professor J. Martin Hunter, Khawar Qureshi and Frances Gibb, Legal Affairs Editor at The Times. Later that year the International Conference of Jurists was organized in New Delhi by the International Council of Jurists, the All India Bar Association, the All India Senior Advocates Association and the Indian Council of Jurists. Pratibha Patil, the president of India, presented the 2009 International Jurists Award to Donald C. Johnson, director of the Dean Rusk Center at the University of Georgia. Chan Sek Keong, Chief Justice of Singapore, also received the International Jurist Award in 2009.

=== 2011 ===
In 2011 Vijay J. Darda, a Congress MP and chairman of the Lokmat Group, received the International Jurists Award for his contribution in the field of legal education in rural areas. The award was presented by Lord Phillips in London on 21 June 2011.

=== 2012 ===
In May 2012 the International Council of Jurists held a conference in London to cover a range of topics including judicial reforms and the role of jurists in nuclear disarmament. The 2012 ICJ Award was conferred by Lord Phillips, President of the Supreme Court of the United Kingdom, on Iftikhar Muhammad Chaudhry, one of the ICJ vice-presidents. The second recipient of the 2012 ICJ Award was Samajwadi Party chief Mulayam Singh Yadav for his support to the development of the legal fraternity in India. He was not present to receive the award in person. (Note: The ICJ president Adish Aggarwala was advocate general of Uttar Pradesh when Mulayam Singh Yadav was chief minister.)

=== 2013 ===
In 2013 the International Council of Jurists wrote a letter to President Mahinda Rajapaksa of Sri Lanka that supported impeachment of Chief Justice Shirani Bandaranayake. The Chief Justice of Pakistan, Iftikhar Muhammad Chaudhry, a vice-president of the ICJ, dissociated himself from this letter in a statement on the website of the Supreme Court of Pakistan. Neither Chaudhry nor the two British jurists named as vice-presidents on the ICJ website, Navnit Dholakia, Baron Dholakia and Gavin Lightman, had been aware of the letter. Gavin Lightman resigned from the ICJ.

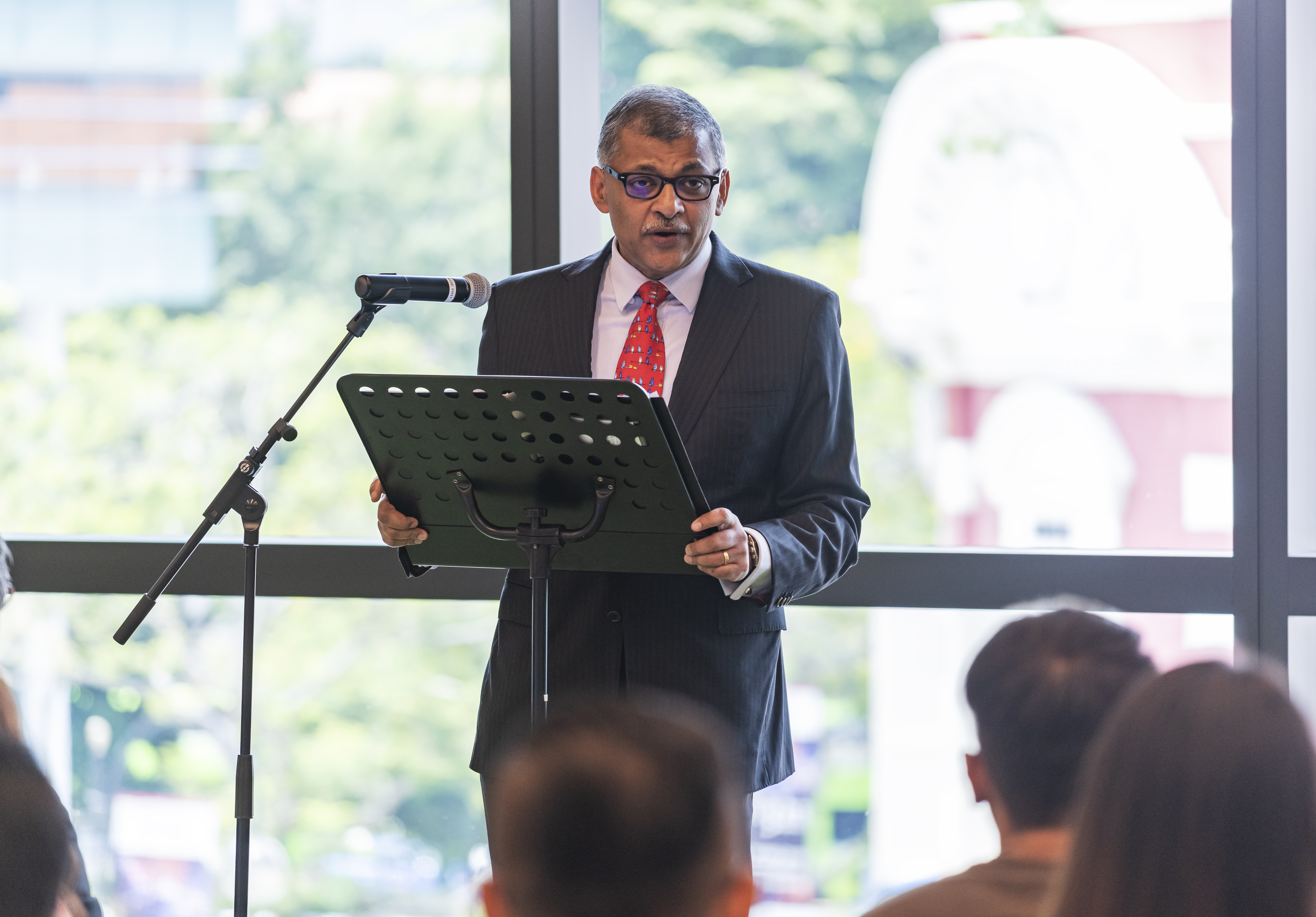
Sundaresh Menon, Chief Justice of Singapore, in 2019

The International Council of Jurists and the University of Mumbai jointly organized a lecture on 19 April 2013 in Mumbai. Sundaresh Menon spoke on The Impact of Public International Law in the Commercial Sphere and Its Significance to Asia. Menon, Chief Justice of Singapore, received the International Jurist Award. The 2013 International Conference of Jurists was scheduled for London on 25–26 June 2013. Aggarwala said it would continue discussions that had started in a recent ICJ session in Delhi. Topics included human rights and ways to curb terrorism.

=== 2014 ===
The ICJ held a convention in London in June 2014, with working sessions on mediation, freedom of information (issues and challenges); the press; law and ethics; terrorism, human rights and immigration; the relationship between the judiciary, legislature and the executive; arbitration; protection of intellectual property rights; and corporate governance. Roy G. Spece, Jr., John D. Lyons Professor of Law at the University of Arizona, spoke on Separation of Powers and on The Role of Legal Education in Modern Society.

Aloun Ndombet-Assamba, High Commissioner of Jamaica to the United Kingdom, received the 2014 International Jurists Award for her contributions to Alternative Dispute Resolution. Assamba was cochair of the session on Mediation. Peter Tomka, president of the International Court of Justice, presented Ashok Chauhan, Founder President of the Amity Education Group, with the International Council of Jurists Award 2014 for his contribution to legal education. Awards were also given to Mark Stephens, President of the Commonwealth Lawyers Association and author J. K. Rowling. The ceremony was attended by chief justices, ministers, judges, members of parliament and other prominent people.

=== 2015 ===
In October 2015 Adish C. Aggarwala gave an interview to The Dollar Business in which he called for change to the working of investigating agencies such as the Enforcement Directorate, FEMA, and Directorate of Revenue Intelligence (DRI). He said these agencies reacted to issues with private sector banks, but tended to ignored information about transactions through public sector undertakings and public sector banks, which they expected to be genuine.

=== 2017 ===
In 2017 the International Council of Jurists asked the Chief Justice of India to order an inquiry into allegations of irregularities against a senior sitting Supreme Court of India judge. A committee investigating allegations against two Odisha high court judges had dropped their inquiry when they found the Supreme Court judge might be involved. The ICJ noted that the Chief Justice of India in 2013 had pressed the Sri Lankan government to launch an impeachment probe of former Chief Justice Shirani Bandaranayake. Adish Aggarwala said it was extremely rare for the ICJ to involve itself in cases related to judicial appointments.

=== 2019 ===
On 11 July 2019 Brunei Chief Justice Dato Paduka Steven Chong was awarded the International Jurists Award 2019 for life-long contribution to administration of justice. Adish Aggarwala presented the award at the Supreme Court of Brunei Darussalam.

== Coronavirus conspiracy theory ==
In April 2020 the ICJ president President Adish Aggarwala made a statement on the COVID-19 pandemic in which he said "This pandemic declared by the WHO is primarily due to conspiracy of Chinese government aimed at catapulting itself to the position of a superpower of the World and undermining other countries through biological warfare". Aggarwala said it was a mystery that the virus had not spread in all provinces of China but had spread to all countries in the world. He filed a complaint with the United Nations Human Rights Council (UNHRC) in which he listed the People's Republic of China, People's Liberation Army and Wuhan Institute of Virology as respondents. He called on the UNHRC to order China to pay "exemplary damages to the entire world and in particular to India" for spreading the disease. The Indian government hastened to state that they did not share these views and had no relations with the International Council of Jurists.

== Office bearers ==
According to the ICJ website, as of June 2024 the office bearers were:

Office	Incumbent	Other positions
President	Adish Aggarwala	President, International Commission of Writers Chairman, All India Bar Association, Chairman, National Citizens’ Committee, Ex. President, Supreme Court Bar Association, Ex. Special Counsel, Government of India, Ex. Senior Additional Advocate General of Haryana, Ex. Additional Advocate General of Punjab, Uttar Pradesh & Tamil Nadu, Ex. Vice-Chairman, Bar Council of India, Ex. Vice-President, Supreme Court Bar Association Ex. Chairman, Bar Council of Delhi, President, India Legal Information Institute
Co-President	Awn Al-Khasawneh	former Prime Minister of Jordan, former Vice President, International Court of Justice
Co-President	K. G. Balakrishnan	former Chief Justice of India, former Chairperson, National Human Rights Commission
Vice-President	David Lammy	Member of Parliament (United Kingdom), former Shadow Secretary of State for Foreign, Commonwealth and Development Affairs, former Minister of State for Innovation & Universities, former Shadow Minister for Universities and Science
Vice-President	Iftikhar Muhammad Chaudhry	former Chief Justice of Pakistan
General Secretary	Ahmed Muthasim Adnan	Chief Justice of Maldives
Honorary Secretary	Rizine R. Mzikamanda SC	Chief Justice of Malawi
Honorary Secretary	Alnashir Visram	Judge of the Court of Appeal of Kenya
Honorary Secretary	James M. Farley	Former Judge, Supreme Court of Ontario (Canada)
Honorary Secretary	Nguyen Van Quyen	President, Vietnam Lawyers Association
Director	Sarah J. Marchington	British Solicitor
