= William Watson (writer) =

Scottish author, playwright and newspaper editor

- Born: 30 April 1931; Edinburgh
- Died: 5 December 2005 (aged 74); Edinburgh
- Occupations: author, playwright
- Writing career
- Pen name: J.K. Mayo
- Genres: Spy fiction Historical fiction

William Hugh Charles Watson (30 April 1931 – 5 December 2005) was a Scottish author, playwright and newspaper editor. He was initially Literary and then Features editor of the Scotsman newspaper.

Born in Edinburgh on 30 April 1931, he attended Edinburgh Academy and then entered Edinburgh and Oxford universities but did not complete either course.

He commenced writing novels in 1969 with Better than One and then wrote two historical novels. The first, titled Beltran in Exile (1979) was about the Knights Templar after the end of the Crusades in Palestine. The Knight on the Bridge (1982) is about the Cathars. These two latter books are generally regarded as his best works.

Between 1970 and 1972 he wrote three plays; Footstool for God, set in Rosslyn Chapel, The Larch and Dodwell's Last Trump. He also co-wrote Sawney Bean with Robert Nye in 1970, and, with Nye, Stanley Eveling, Alan Jackson, Clarisse Eriksson, John Downing and David Mowat an adaptation of Dracula which premiered in Edinburgh in 1969, and in London in 1972.

He wrote six spy thrillers under the nom-de-plume of J K Mayo between 1986 and 1997 using a middle-aged, irritable, Gauloise-smoking ex-army Colonel named Harry Seddall as his hero for these books. An interesting aside is his use of little-known and obscure words to enhance his descriptions of places and conversations throughout the books.

He died in an Edinburgh nursing home on 5 December 2005 after a long illness.

He left a wife named Catherine Robins.

== Selected works ==
Nr	Name	Type	Year
1.	Better than One	Novel	1969
2.	Sawney Bean	Play	1970
3.	A Footstool for God	Play	1972
4.	Beltran in Exile (The Last of the Templars)	Historical novel	1979
5.	The Knight on the Bridge	Historical novel	1982
6.	The Hunting Season^{1}	Spy novel	1986
7.	Wolf's Head^{1}	Spy novel	1987
8.	Cry Havoc^{1}	Spy novel	1990
9.	A Shred of Honour^{1}	Spy novel	1993
10.	The Masterless Men^{1}	Spy novel	1995
11.	The Interloper^{1}	Spy novel	1997

^{1} Published under the pseudonym of J.K. Mayo.
