= The Dead Sea Scrolls Deception =

1991 book by Michael Baigent and Richard Leigh

- First edition
- Author: Michael Baigent and Richard Leigh
- Language: English
- Genre: Religion
- Publisher: Jonathan Cape
- Publication date: 1991
- ISBN: 0-671-73454-7

The Dead Sea Scrolls Deception (1991, ISBN 0-671-73454-7) is a book by authors Michael Baigent and Richard Leigh. Rejecting the established scholarly consensus that the Dead Sea Scrolls were the work of a marginal Jewish apocalyptic movement, and following primarily the thesis of Robert Eisenman, the authors argue that the scrolls were the work of Jewish zealots who had much in common with, and may have been identical to, the early followers of Jesus led by his brother James the Just. Their unconventional hypothesis provides a different version of the history of early Christianity and challenges the divinity of Jesus.

Leigh and Baigent claim that the scrolls were kept under wraps for decades by a team dominated by Catholic scholars under the leadership of a Dominican friar, Roland de Vaux. They contend that the preconceptions of de Vaux and other members of the team led them to ignore evidence of the probable 1st-century provenance of many of the scrolls, and instead, to consign these scrolls safely to the distant past.

== Criticism ==
The book was severely criticised by Hershel Shanks, editor of the Biblical Archaeology Review. Catholic biblical scholar Joseph Fitzmyer has described it as consisting largely of a "pattern of errors and misinformed statements".

The book makes a number of incorrect claims and has been ridiculed by scholars who have worked with the Dead Sea Scrolls and who have come to the conclusion that Jesus and early Christianity are very different from the ideas and people represented in the Dead Sea Scrolls.

== See also ==
- John Allegro English archaeologist and Dead Sea scholar
- Christ myth theory
- Gnosticism and the New Testament
- Historicity of Jesus
- The Holy Blood and the Holy Grail
