= The Temple and the Lodge =

1988 history book

- First UK edition
- Authors: Michael Baigent; Richard Leigh
- Language: English
- Subject: Freemasony
- Publisher: Jonathan Cape
- Publication date: 1988
- Publication place: United Kingdom
- Pages: 306
- ISBN: 0224024728

The Temple and the Lodge is a book written by Michael Baigent and Richard Leigh, in which the authors claim to trace a link between the suppressed Knights Templar and modern day Freemasonry.

== Synopsis ==
The thesis of the book is that after the Knights Templar were suppressed for heresy at the behest of the King of France some elements found refuge in Scotland where they helped the Scots in their fight for independence from the English and the Templar Order survived through Jacobite Freemasonry to Strict Observance and the Grand Orient of France.

It also claims that many of the people behind the American Revolution were Freemasons, as were some of the less successful British commanders such as Howe and Cornwallis, who they claim intentionally lost (or tried to win by doing the bare minimum required) some of the battles to prevent the destruction of America's economic base.

== Critique ==
Baigent and Leigh's claims have been debunked as peusdo-history similar to that promoted by the likes of Eric von Daniken. The unsubstantiated claim that the Knights Templar fled to Scotland in 1307, fought on the side of Robert the Bruce at the Battle of Bannockburn (23 - 24 June 1314) and then continued to exist underground to emerge later as Freemasons has been disproved by several authors.

== Release ==
It was originally published in London by Jonathan Cape in 1988. The first U.S. printing was by Arcade Publishing in New York in 1989.
