= Patricia Kennealy-Morrison =

American writer (1946–2021)

- Born: Patricia Kennely; March 4, 1946; New York City, U.S.
- Died: July 21, 2021 (aged 75); New York City, U.S.
- Education: St. Bonaventure University; Harpur College (BA); New York University; Parsons School of Design; Christ Church, Oxford
- Occupations: Journalist, writer

Signature
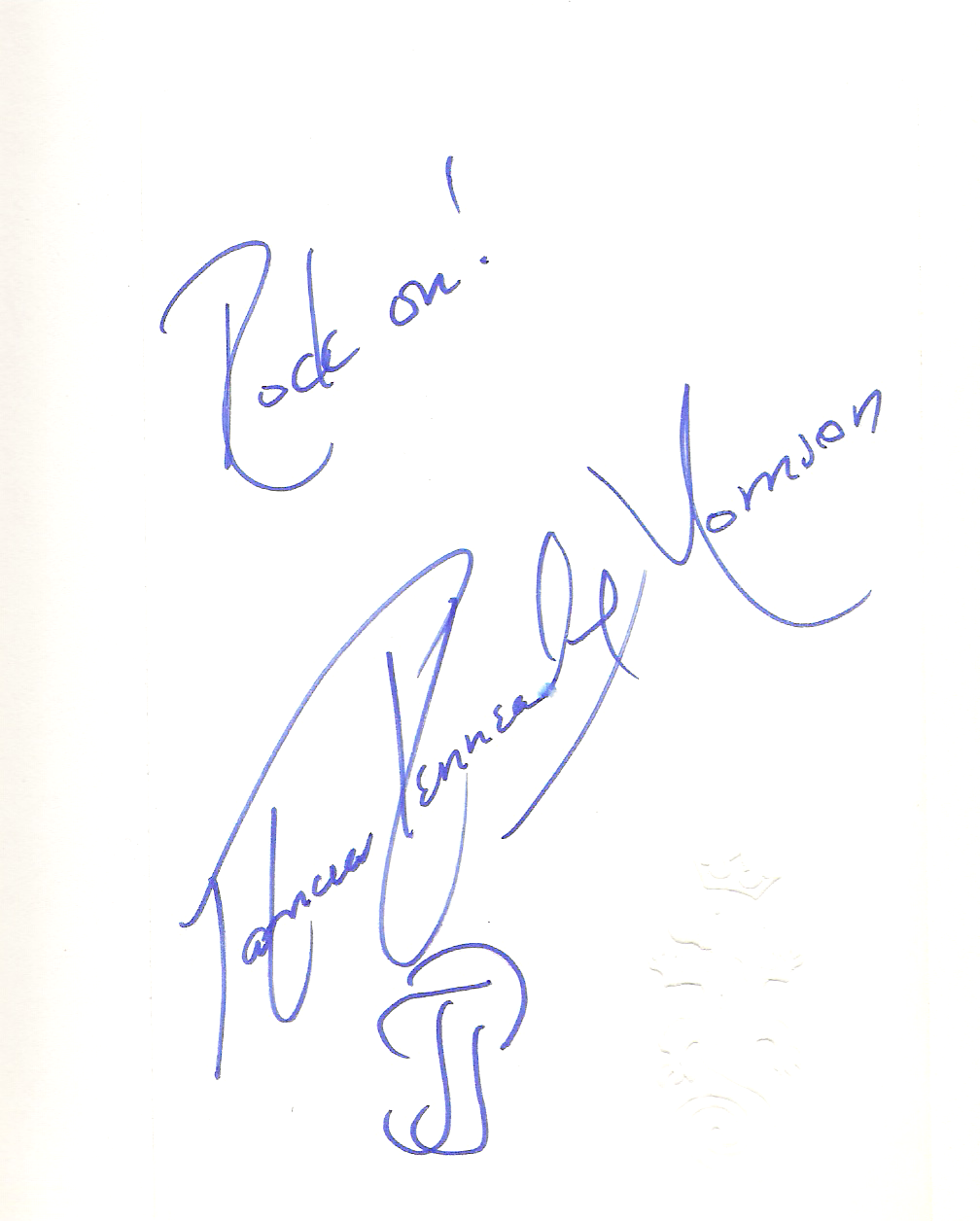

Patricia Kennealy-Morrison (born Patricia Kennely; March 4, 1946 – July 21, 2021) was an American author and journalist. Her published works include rock criticism, a memoir, and two series of science fiction/fantasy and murder mystery novels. Her books are evenly divided between the series The Keltiad and The Rock&Roll Murders: The Rennie Stride Mysteries.

As first a writer and then the editor-in-chief of Jazz & Pop magazine in the late 1960s, she was one of the first women rock critics. Kennealy-Morrison worked as an advertising copywriter, receiving two Clio nominations. She was a Dame of the Ordo Supremus Militaris Templi Hierosolymitani, a High Priestess in a Celtic Pagan tradition and a member of Mensa.

== Life and career ==
Kennealy-Morrison was born in Brooklyn, New York on March 4, 1946, the daughter of Genevieve Mary (McDonald) and Joseph Gerard Kennely, and reared on Long Island in the hamlet of North Babylon. Her family was strict Irish Catholic.

She attended St. Bonaventure University for two years, majoring in journalism. She later transferred to Harpur College (now Binghamton University), where she graduated with a B.A. in English Literature in 1967. She also studied at NYU, Parsons School of Design, and Christ Church, University of Oxford.

After her college graduation at age 21, she moved to New York City, where she worked first as a lexicographer for Macmillan Publishing, then as an editorial assistant, and, from 1968 to 1971, editor-in-chief of Jazz & Pop magazine. She was one of the first female rock critics.

As editor-in-chief of Jazz & Pop she first interviewed Jim Morrison of the rock band the Doors in January 1969. After the interview, they began a correspondence, became friends and later lovers. She and Morrison exchanged vows in a Celtic handfasting ceremony in June 1970. Before witnesses, the couple signed a document declaring themselves wed. The relationship continued to be long-distance, which she said suited them both just fine. As temperamental artists with their own careers, living together for more than short periods of time may have been too much for either to handle. She preferred a non-traditional arrangement to "domesticity" and had no desire to "wash [Jim's] socks". Morrison could be very difficult, at times loving and gentle, then suddenly brutal, or cold and distant. By the time Morrison was on trial in Miami for indecent exposure, potentially facing a long sentence of hard labor, his at times erratic and even cruel behaviour led her to speculate that maybe he had not taken the wedding as seriously as he had led her to believe. However, Morrison would change his tune yet again and profess his love and desire for domesticity, claiming he was planning on returning to her and to the Doors in the fall. Kennealy-Morrison was skeptical by this point, as he was known to vacillate like this in his other relationships as well. Jim Morrison's sudden death at 27 would mean a lack of closure not only for her, but for the many people in his life.

Kennealy-Morrison served as an advisor to Oliver Stone for the 1991 film The Doors, making a small cameo appearance as the High Priestess who marry the Jim and Patricia characters (Val Kilmer and Kathleen Quinlan). However, in subsequent interviews and writings, she has scathingly criticized Stone's portrayal of Morrison, herself, and others depicted for the fictionalized drama, saying the film bore little or no resemblance to the people she had known or the events they lived through; Stone conceded the Patricia character was a composite of several of Morrison's girlfriends and regretted not giving her a different identity. While the Patricia character in the film is a "Wicca Priestess", Kennealy herself was instead a Celtic Pagan.

Kennealy-Morrison published the memoir Strange Days: My Life With and Without Jim Morrison as response and rejoinder to Stone's film.

In 2000, Robin Ventura, third baseman for the pennant-winning New York Mets, took the phrase "Mojo Risin" from the Doors' "L.A. Woman" and made it the rallying cry for the team that year. Ventura and the Mets invited Kennealy-Morrison to a game just before the playoffs, where she met with them and became a Mets fan.

Following a 1999 split with her publisher HarperCollins, on May 19, 2007, Kennealy-Morrison announced via her blog that she planned to start her own publishing house, Lizard Queen Press, and to self-publish novels and non-fiction. The next Keltiad novel was to be The Beltane Queen, but she turned to mystery writing instead.

The first book to carry the Lizard Queen Press imprint is Ungrateful Dead: Murder at the Fillmore, published in 2007, first in the Rennie Stride series, which to date consists of six published books, all released on Lizard Queen Press. Additionally on LQP are Rock Chick: A Girl and Her Music (2013), a collection of PKM's writings originally published in Jazz & Pop magazine, Tales of Spiral Castle: Stories of the Keltiad (August 2014), a short-story collection set in her Keltiad world. Son of the Northern Star, a fictional account of the conflict between the Viking king Guthrum and Alfred the Great, was intended for publication by LQP but remained unfinished at the time of the author's death.

Ungrateful Dead: Murder at the Fillmore is the first in a series of murder mysteries set in the turbulent world of 1960s rock & roll. Ungrateful Dead introduces the protagonist, Rennie Stride, rock reporter/detective, and her boyfriend (later husband) Turk Wayland, superstar English lead guitarist. Kennealy-Morrison has described the series as:

Seamlessly blending the fictional with the real: the stars, the bands, the music, all the excitement of the most incredible decade of the last century ... Full of rockworld dish and attitude, created by someone who was not only there for it but made some of it happen herself, and who took just enough drugs to get into it and not so many that she can't remember it ...

Ungrateful Dead was published on November 1, 2007, to coincide with both the Day of the Dead and The Celtic New Year. Further novels in the Rennie Stride series are California Screamin': Murder at Monterey Pop (May 2009), Love Him Madly: Murder at the Whisky (March 2010), A Hard Slay's Night: Murder at the Royal Albert Hall (January 2011), Go Ask Malice: Murder at Woodstock (November 2012), and Scareway to Heaven: Murder at the Fillmore East (December 2014). The most recent in the series is Daydream Bereaver: Murder on the Good Ship Rock&Roll (published March 2016).

== Name ==
The author's legal name was "Patricia Kennealy Morrison". As a rock critic and editor, she initially published under her birth name, "Patricia Kennely", and later "Patricia Kennealy" (both are pronounced the same; she changed the spelling to be closer to the pronunciation). From 1994 to 2007 her books were published as "Patricia Kennealy-Morrison", with the hyphen. Ungrateful Dead and the subsequent Rennie Stride novels were her first books to be published as simply "Patricia Morrison". The author had said that she wished to make a distinction between her Celtic fantasy novels and the murder mysteries, so decided to use different versions of her name rather than an invented pen name.

== Death ==
She died in her sleep, at the age of 75 on July 21, 2021, in bed in her apartment. The cause of death was listed as complications from heart disease.

== Bibliography ==
=== Novels ===
==== The Keltiad ====
- Blackmantle: A Triumph (1997)
- Tales of Spiral Castle: Stories of the Keltiad (2014) short stories

Tales of Aeron

- The Copper Crown (1984)
- The Throne of Scone (1986)
- The Silver Branch (1988)

Tales of Arthur

- The Hawk's Gray Feather (1990)
- The Oak Above the Kings (1994)
- The Hedge of Mist (1996)

Colloquies of the Ancients

- The Deer's Cry (1998)

==== The Rennie Stride Mysteries ====
The Rock & Roll Murders

- Ungrateful Dead: Murder at the Fillmore (2007)
- California Screamin': Murder at Monterey Pop (2009)
- Love Him Madly: Murder at the Whisky (2010)
- A Hard Slay's Night: Murder at the Royal Albert Hall (2011)
- Go Ask Malice: Murder at Woodstock (2012)
- Scareway to Heaven: Murder at the Fillmore East (2014)
- Daydream Bereaver: Murder on the Good Ship Rock&Roll (2016)

=== Non-fiction ===
- Strange Days: My Life With and Without Jim Morrison (1992)
- Rock Chick: A Girl and Her Music (2013)

=== Anthologies ===
- Rock She Wrote: Women Write About Rock, Pop, and Rap, eds. Evelyn McDonnell and Ann Powers (1995), "Rock Around the Cock". ISBN 0-385-31250-4. pp. 358–363.
- The Faces of Fantasy: Photographs by Patti Perret, intro. by Terri Windling, ISBN 0-312-86182-6
- Crusade of Fire: Mystical Tales of the Knights Templar, ed. Katherine Kurtz (2002), "The Last Voyage". ISBN 0-446-61090-9
