= Alexander Deuchar =

Alexander Deuchar (1777 – 12 August 1844) was a seal engraver who revived the Templar tradition in Scotland in the early 19th century in order to establish a new form of chivalry. The Deuchar family had been Jacobite sympathisers, but transferred their allegiance to the Hanoverian cause before 1745, when a prominent Jacobite, Lyon of Easter Ogil, carried off the great sword of Deuchar, although it was recovered after the Battle of Culloden in 1746, and in the possession of Alexander when he started his revival of the Scottish Knights Templar. The new Order started formally in 1805 when a charter was issued to Deuchar by the Early Grand Encampment of Ireland (previously the High Knight Templars of Ireland Lodge, Kilwinning Lodge, and itself operating under a charter from the Grand Master of Lodge Mother Kilwinning, in Ayrshire), under the title of the Edinburgh Encampment No. 31. It became the Grand Assembly of Knights Templar in Edinburgh.

Deuchar's brother, David, who was serving in the 1st Regiment of Foot, The Royal Scots (The Royal Regiment), joined with other officers of the Regiment. In 1809 Alexander began, with Major Mueller of the same regiment, to request authority from the Duke of Kent, Grand Master of the Order in England, for a charter for a new Grand Conclave. The charter was granted, finally, on 19 June 1811, for the "Grand Conclave of Knights of the Holy Temple and Sepulcher, and of St. John of Jerusalem, H.R.D.M. + K.D.S.H.". David Deuchar served in the Peninsular War (1808–14) in the 3rd Battalion of the 1st Regiment of Foot of The Royal Scots and during the campaign in Portugal took the altar cross from the Templar Church at the Castle of Tomar, which had been destroyed by the French, and presented the Cross at the inauguration of the Conclave. Somewhat controversially, Alexander Deuchar opened membership of the Conclave to non-Masons, and issued charters to Encampments which were non-Masonic.
