= Judicial Conduct Investigations Office =

The Judicial Conduct Investigations Office (JCIO) is an independent statutory office in England and Wales whose remit is to investigate allegations of judicial misconduct. It supports the Lord Chancellor and Lord Chief Justice who share responsibility for judicial discipline. It was established on 1 October 2013, when it replaced the Office for Judicial Complaints; both were created under the Constitutional Reform Act 2005.

The JCIO, as of 2024-25, had a staff of twenty civil servants who, for administrative purposes, work within the Judicial Office from offices in the Royal Courts of Justice. In 2024-25, it received 3,279 complaints about judges, tribunal members and coroners. Complaints about magistrates are not included in the total as they are delegated to a local advisory committee and only referred to the JCIO if disciplinary action is recommended. It rejected 2,718 complaints as not meeting the criteria for acceptance and dismissed a further 252. It upheld 89 complaints, 52 of which were against magistrates. Thirteen magistrates, two courts judges, and four tribunal judges and members were removed; the others received lesser sanctions, such as advice or a warning.

Until October 2023, complaints about tribunal judges and members were the responsibility of tribunal presidents and only referred to the JCIO if disciplinary action was recommended. Since October 2023, they are dealt with by the JCIO, thus accounting for a large increase in the number of complaints received.

Disciplinary statements are published by the JCIO where a finding of misconduct has been made. Most statements are deleted after two, four, five or six years depending on the severity of the sanction, while statements for removal from office (except for failure to meet minimum sitting requirements) are not deleted. Statements which have been deleted are available upon request. The Lord Chancellor and Lord Chief Justice may, at their discretion, decline to publish a disciplinary statement.

The JCIO describes its remit as follows:

The judicial disciplinary system exists to ensure that allegations of misconduct are dealt with efficiently, fairly, and proportionately, thereby safeguarding public confidence in the independence,integrity, and good standing of the judiciary.

Baroness Harman was critical of the JCIO in her 2025 Independent review of bullying, harassment and sexual harassment at the Bar, saying "The JCIO should encourage complaints, not rule them out based on an arbitrary three-month time limit". She also expressed concern about the threshold for the particularisation of complaints, and the rejection of complaints concerning case management. In January 2026, the High Court granted permission to a group of women, whose complaints about Employment Judge Philip Lancaster had been rejected, to bring a claim for judicial review against the JCIO. A month before the case was due to be heard on 8 June 2026 at the High Court, the JCIO agreed to reconsider the complaints about EJ Lancaster and pay the women's costs.
