= Adish Aggarwala =

Indian jurist

Adish Chandra Aggarwala
- Born: 30 September 1956 (age 70); Rohtak, Punjab, India (now in Haryana)
- Occupations: Designated Senior Advocate, Jurist
- Organization: International Council of Jurists
- Spouse: Saroj Aggarwala

Adish C. Aggarwala is a jurist and the President of International Council of Jurists. He served as Chairman of All India Bar Association.

== Career ==
In 2024, the Supreme Court of India marked electoral bonds as "unconstitutional", and requested the State Bank of India to comply with SC and release details regarding the origins of bonds. In March 2024, Aggarwala, under the office of the President of the Supreme Court Bar Association, submitted a request to the President of India, Droupadi Murmu arguing for an intervention on her end. This was met with a condemnation by the SCBA, arguing that the "members of the committee have neither authorised the President (Aggarwala) to write any such letter nor do they subscribe to his views as expressed therein."

In 2015, Aggarwala published Narendra Modi - A Charismatic & Visionary Statesman (with Sarah J. Marchington), which contains forewords from several Bharatiya Janata Party and Rashtriya Swayamsevak Sangh members.

== Publications ==
- Constitution of India (2009)
- Narendra Modi - A Charismatic & Visionary Statesman (with Sarah J. Marchington)
