= Frances Gibb =

British journalist and legal editor

- Occupation: Journalist
- Known for: Legal editor of The Times

Frances Gibb (born 1951) is a British journalist and the former legal editor of The Times. She retired from the newspaper in February 2019, and continues to write and broadcast on the law, contributing to publications including The Times, The Sunday Times, The Daily Telegraph and The Spectator.

== Early life and education ==
Frances Gibb was born in north London, the eldest of three children. Her father was a solicitor and her mother a writer of short fiction. She was educated at St Margaret's School, Bushey. She read English at the University of East Anglia in Norwich, England, graduating with first class honours in 1973.

== Career ==
Gibb's first job after graduating was filing cuttings for the news film agency Visnews. In 1974, she joined the Times Higher Education Supplement, where she worked for four years. She then moved to The Daily Telegraph, where she was Art Sales Correspondent from 1978 to 1980, covering major auctions. As a general reporter at The Times from 1980, she covered stories such as the 1980 Dan-Air Flight 1008 crash in Tenerife and the 1981 wedding of Prince Charles and Lady Diana Spencer.

Gibb was appointed Legal Correspondent of The Times in 1982, at the age of thirty-one. As the first person to hold the post from outside the legal profession, she had to overcome some resistance from the then editor, Charles Douglas-Home, but persuaded him that journalistic independence and an ability to communicate to the public were more important. She became Legal Editor of The Times in 2000. As Legal Correspondent and subsequently Legal Editor, Gibb was in charge of daily reporting on legal news, as well as weekly pages on the law. In 2000, she established The Times’ weekly LAW supplement, the only legal pull-out to be published by a national newspaper in the UK. She also oversaw the paper's acclaimed supplements for law students. In recent years, she launched the newspaper's daily legal bulletin, The Brief, of which she was co-editor. She served under nine editors on The Times, including William Rees-Mogg and John Witherow.

In 2006, Gibb was the recipient of the Bar Council's Legal Reporting Awards for 2005–2006. In 2009, she received an award from the International Council of Jurists, presented by Lord Phillips of Worth Matravers at a ceremony in London.

== Retirement ==
Gibb retired from The Times on 7 February 2019. In a column published that day, Lord Pannick QC wrote:

As legal affairs correspondent of this paper since 1982, and legal editor since 2000, Frances Gibb has heard all the legal news and reported it accurately, fairly and innovatively. […] She has made a significant contribution to the new relationship between the press and the legal profession by giving confidence to judges and lawyers that their confidences will be respected. She has served the public interest by her ability to communicate complicated issues in language that non-specialists can understand. She has maintained her sense of humour and her eye for the legally absurd."

On 5 February 2019, a motion was tabled in the House of Commons by Keith Vaz and sponsored by Drew Hendry:

That this House notes the impending retirement of Frances Gibb, the Legal Editor of The Times for 19 years; recalls her distinguished career involving periods at Visnews, The Daily Telegraph and The Times, as legal correspondent from 1982; commends her reporting on such significant developments in the British legal system as the establishment of the Crown Prosecution Service, the Supreme Court and the Ministry of Justice; welcomes the innovations in legal journalism she has facilitated that include the Law Supplement, the Student Law Supplement and The Brief; recognises the many campaigns she has led, including at The Times to end fault-based divorce proceedings; wishes her well in her retirement; and thanks her for inspiring a new generation of legal correspondents.

== Recent journalism ==
Gibb has remained active in the legal field since she retired from The Times, with regular contributions to her former paper as well as The Sunday Times, The Daily Telegraph, and PM on BBC Radio 4.
