= Crusade of Fire =

Fantasy anthology

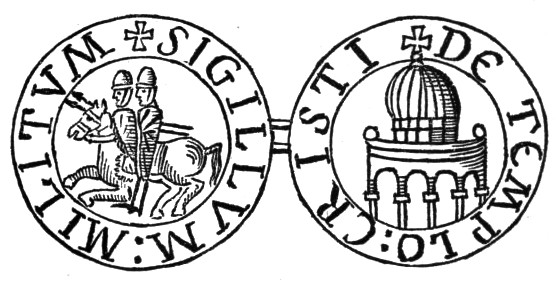
- Seal of the Knights Templar
- Author: Katherine Kurtz
- Published: 2002
- ISBN: 0-446-61090-9
- Preceded by: Tales of the Knights Templar (ISBN 0-446-60138-1), One Crusade: More Tales of the Knights Templar (ISBN 0-446-61317-7)

Crusade of Fire is an anthology edited by Katherine Kurtz.

Crusade of Fire is the third anthology in the "Tales of the Knights Templar" series about the Knights Templars.

It consists of eight different tales that concern the more mystical and mysterious side of the military religious order.

These tales span from the actual period of the Knights Templar's existence to more contemporary myths.

The previous anthologies in the series were Tales of the Knights Templar and One Crusade: More Tales of the Knights Templar.

== Contents ==
- "White Knights" by Katherine Kurtz
- "Harvest of Souls" by Deborah Turner Harris
- "In the Presence of Mine Enemies" by Susan Schwartz
- "The Last Voyage" by Patricia Kennealy-Morrison
- "Bones of Contention" by Richard Woods
- "Occam's Treasure" by Robert Reginald
- "Stella Maris" by Scott MacMillan
- "Sleeping Kings" by Debra Doyle and James D. Macdonald

== See also ==
- Tales of the Knights Templar (ISBN 0-446-60138-1)
- One Crusade: More Tales of the Knights Templar (ISBN 0-446-61317-7)
