= Knights Templar in Scotland =

In 1128, the cousin of St Bernard of Clairvaux, Hugues de Payens, met King David I in Scotland. The Order established a seat at Balantrodoch, now Temple, Midlothian on the South Esk (River Esk, Lothian). In 1189, Alan FitzWalter, the 2nd Lord High Steward of Scotland was a benefactor of the Order.

In about the year 1187, William the Lion granted part of the Culter lands on the south bank of the River Dee, Aberdeenshire, to the Knights Templar and between 1221 and 1236 Walter Bisset of Aboyne founded a Preceptory for the Knights Templar. In 1287 and 1288, they built a Chapel dedicated to Mary the Mother of Christ, known as St Mary's Chapel and in November 1309, the name of a William Middleton of the "Tempill House of Culter" was recorded with still signs of Templars.

It has been claimed that in 1309 during the trial of the Templars in Scotland Bishop Lamberton of St Andrews, Guardian of Scotland 1299–1301 gave the Templars his protection, although there is no evidence to support this claim. It should also be recorded that John of Fordun's Chronicle of the Scottish Nation, a major Scottish mediaeval source makes no mention at all of the Templars. However, Bishop Lamberton had returned to Scotland from his imprisonment in England in 1308, so any decisions about the Templars would have been in his hands. There is no record of Lamberton or any other Scottish bishop putting the Templar's on trial.

The Knights Templar had considerable possessions in the County of Nairn, or Moray, in 1296. The following extract is taken from The History of Nairn:

"...There is a writ extant granted in their [the Knights Templar] favour at Berwick, addressed to the Sheriff of Invernairn to put them in possession of their lands, they having made submission to Edward I. This was no doubt done. From the deed of conveyance of the Temple lands in the North from Lord Torphichen, the last Master of the Order, it appears that the following were the lands held here. Those two roods of arable land lying within the territory of the Burgh of Nairn, in that part thereof called [blank] possessed by John Rose, burgess of Nairn, and his sub-tenants; those two roods of arable temple land and house lying within the said territory of Nairn, possessed by Hew Rose of Kilravock and his sub-tenants; all and haill those our temple lands called the lands of Pitfundie lying in the said Sheriffdom of Nairn, betwixt the strype that conies from the lands of Brodie on the east, the fludder or myre upon the south side of the common muir called the Hardmuir on the south side, the lands of Penick and wood of Lochloy on the west, and the Euchcarse of Culbyn on the north, for the most part possessed by the lairds of Brodie, and their sub-tenants."

They also had land designated in old charters as Temple Land, Temple Cruik, Temple Bank, and Bogschand, which lay partly in the vicinity of the town of Ardersier, between Connage, Flemington and the sea. A charter granted at Nairn refers to the locus trialis at Ardersier, doubtless an ancient place of trial by "wager of battle". The Temple lands of Ardersier were held by Davidsons and Mackays as portioners. They were acquired by Cawdor in 1626. The Temple lands at Brodie and elsewhere appear to have been disposed of about the same time, as in a Brodie, charter of date 1626 the lands of Pitfundie are included in the Brodie estate. The Templars were a religious and military order of Knights who escorted pilgrims to Jerusalem at a time when such pilgrimages were attended by dangers from robbers. They wore a white robe with a red Maltese cross on the breast, and at first were all of noble birth, The Knights of St. John of Jerusalem had lands in Nairnshire. It is impossible now to identify them. When the Knights Templar were suppressed by Edward II their property was given to the Knights of St. John.

In 1312, by order of a Papal Bull, Vox in Excelso, all assets of the Order of the Temple were given to Knights Hospitaller or Order of St. John except for Spain where they were succeeded by the Order of Montesa the Order of Calatrava, from which its first recruits were drawn, and Portugal where they became the Order of Christ and it has been claimed that in Scotland the Order combined with the Hospitallers and continued as The Order of St John and the Temple until the Reformation, although there is no evidence to that effect. When Sir James Sandilands, Preceptor of the Order converted to Protestantism in 1553, the Order is thought to have ceased.

== See also ==
- Scottish Knights Templar
- Rosslyn Chapel
