= Michael Baigent =

New Zealand writer (1948–2013)

- Born: Michael Barry Meehan; 27 February 1948; Nelson, New Zealand
- Died: 17 June 2013 (aged 65); Brighton, England
- Education: University of Kent
- Occupations: Author and lecturer
- Known for: Co-authoring The Holy Blood and the Holy Grail

Michael Baigent (born Michael Barry Meehan, 27 February 1948 – 17 June 2013) was a New Zealand writer who published a number of popular works questioning traditional perceptions of history and the life of Jesus. He is known best as a co-author of the book The Holy Blood and the Holy Grail.

== Biography ==
Baigent was born on 27 February 1948 in Nelson, New Zealand and spent his childhood in the nearby communities of Motueka and Wakefield. His father was a devout Roman Catholic, and he was tutored in Catholic theology from the age of five. After his father left the family when Baigent was eight years old, he went to live with his maternal grandfather, Lewis Baigent, and adopted his surname. His great-grandfather, Henry Baigent served as a Nelson city mayor and had founded a forestry business, H. Baigent and Sons.

His secondary schooling was at Nelson College, and then he attended the University of Canterbury, Christchurch, initially intending to study science and continue in the family career of forestry, but switched to studying comparative religion and philosophy.

After graduating in 1972, Baigent made extensive travels to different countries, as a freelancer. He did stints as a war-photographer in Laos and as a fashion-photographer in Spain, before arriving at England in 1976. While working for the BBC photographic department and doing night shifts for a soft-drinks factory, he met Richard Leigh via a television producer who was producing a series on the Knights Templar. Leigh was to be his frequent co-author during his entire professional life. The two joined Henry Lincoln in researching the alleged mystery of Rennes-le-Château in France, the details of which were revealed in the book The Holy Blood and the Holy Grail.

In 2000, Baigent also earned a Master of Arts degree for the study of Mysticism and Religious Experience at the University of Kent. A Freemason and a Grand Officer (2005) of the United Grand Lodge of England, he was an editor of Freemasonry Today from Spring, 2001 to Summer, 2011 and advocated for a more liberal style for Freemasonry.

== Personal life ==
Baigent married Jane, an interior designer in 1982 and they had two daughters, Isabelle and Tansy, along with two children from her earlier marriage. He died from a brain haemorrhage in Brighton, East Sussex on 18 June 2013.

== Works ==
=== The Holy Blood and the Holy Grail ===
Published on 18 January 1982, The Holy Blood and the Holy Grail popularised the hypothesis that the true nature of the quest for the Holy Grail was that Jesus and Mary Magdalene had a child together, the first of a progeny which later married into a Frankish royal dynasty, the Merovingians, and were associated with a society known as the Priory of Sion.

The theory that Jesus and Mary were in a carnal (physical) relationship is based on Baigent's interpretation of the holy kiss on the mouth (typically between males during early Christian times), and spiritual marriage, as given in the Gospel of Philip. It was promoted earlier by authors Laurence Gardner and Margaret Starbird.

==== Popular and critical reception ====
The book was a bestseller in America. It regained popularity after the publication of Dan Brown's The Da Vinci Code and sold more than six million copies.

Historian Marina Warner noted the book to have many lurid falsehoods and much distorted reasoning. Soon enough, the authors had a public dispute on a BBC broadcast with her and the Bishop of Birmingham. In a scathing review of the book for The Observer, critic Anthony Burgess wrote: "It is typical of my unregenerable soul that I can only see this as a marvelous theme for a novel." A Kirkus Review described the work as an intriguing phantasmagoria wherein the authors jumped "perilous heights to reach crazy conclusions". Colin Henderson Roberts, reviewing for London Review of Books, noted that the work advanced a preposterous hypothesis and made major blunders in its quest to get simple reductive answers from complex questions.

In the immediate aftermath of the publication of The Da Vinci Code, The New York Times Book Review deemed The Holy Blood and the Holy Grail to be among the all-time great works of popular pseudo-history. John J. Doherty, literature librarian at Northern Arizona University, writing in King Arthur in Popular Culture, describes of the work as being "thoroughly debunked by scholars and critics alike". Arthurian scholar Richard Barber commented the work to be a "notorious pseudo-history", which advanced its arguments on innuendo and fertile speculations, and would take a book of equal length to dissect and refute it in entirety.

In 2005, a Channel 4 programme hosted by Tony Robinson interrogated the main arguments of Brown, Baigent and Leigh, and termed the entire episode to be a hoax. Arnaud de Sède, son of Gérard de Sède, stated categorically that his father and Plantard had made up the existence of a 1,000-year-old Priory of Sion, and described the story as "piffle". With increasing proliferation and popularity of books, websites and movies concerning Baigent's works, many critics regard the work to have been influential in popularizing conspiracy theories and pseudohistory. Damian Thompson noted the book to "employ the rhetoric of authentic history, but not its method, to present myths as fact". Laura Miller writing for Salon (website) described the book to have advanced a preposterous idea in stages - first as a wild guess, then as a tentative hypothesis, and lastly as an undeniable fact - but entirely from within a miasma of bogus authenticity.

==== Dan Brown lawsuit ====
Some of the ideas presented in Baigent's book The Holy Blood and the Holy Grail were later incorporated in Dan Brown's bestselling American novel The Da Vinci Code.

In The Da Vinci Code, Dan Brown named the primary antagonist, a British Royal Historian, Knight of the Realm and Grail scholar, Sir Leigh Teabing, KBE, also known as the Teacher, in homage to the authors of The Holy Blood and the Holy Grail. The name combines Richard Leigh's surname with 'Teabing', an anagram of Baigent.

In March 2006, Baigent and Leigh filed a lawsuit in a United Kingdom court against Brown's publisher, Random House, claiming copyright infringement.

Concurrent with the plagiarism trial, Baigent released a new book, The Jesus Papers, amid criticism that it was just a reworking of themes from The Holy Blood and the Holy Grail, and timed to capitalize on the marketing hype concerning the release of the movie The Da Vinci Code, as well as the attention brought by the trial. In the postscript to the book (p. 355), Baigent asserts that the release date had been set by Harper Collins long before.

On 7 April 2006, High Court judge Peter Smith rejected the copyright-infringement claim by Michael Baigent and Richard Leigh. On 28 March 2007, Baigent and Leigh lost their appeal against this decision and had legal bills of about £3 million.

=== Other ===
Beginning in 1989, Baigent and Leigh co-authored several books, most prominently The Dead Sea Scrolls Deception (1991), in which they primarily used the controversial theories of Robert Eisenman concerning the interpretation of the Dead Sea Scrolls. This was discredited by Otto Betz and Rainer Riesner in their book Jesus, Qumran and The Vatican: Clarifications (1994).

In 1999, Baigent and Leigh published The Inquisition. Bernard Hamilton, writing in the English Historical Review, described the book as pursuing "a very outdated and misleading account", which ignored all modern development in Inquisition Studies and grossly exaggerated its power and influence, to the extent of being polemical. Writing in the Spectator magazine, Piers Paul Read deemed the authors to have composed a misinformed diatribe against Catholicism, with nil interest in "understanding the subtleties and paradoxes in the history of the Inquisition". A review in The Independent noted it to be mostly drab and uncontroversial, in reiterating facts which were already known for decades but which progressively gave way to hysteria, in its bid to draw a parallel between the ancient institution and current abuse of power by Catholic authorities. Dongwoo Kim, writing in Constellations, noted the book to not be a significant contribution, in that it was an epitome of Whig historiography which sought for a binary categorization of the past between good and evil, while locating the Catholic Church as the "antithesis of modernity and liberalism".

Baigent himself conceded that none of his theories yielded any positive results: "I would like to think in due course a lot of this material will be proven," he said, "but it's just a hope of mine".

== Bibliography ==
=== Sole author ===
- From the Omens of Babylon: Astrology and Ancient Mesopotamia (1994) ISBN 0-14-019480-0. 2nd edition published as Astrology in Ancient Mesopotamia: The Science of Omens and the Knowledge of the Heavens (2015) ISBN 978-1591432210
- Ancient Traces: Mysteries in Ancient and Early History (1998) ISBN 0-670-87454-X
- The Jesus Papers: Exposing the Greatest Cover-Up in History (2006) ISBN 0-06-082713-0
- Racing Toward Armageddon: The Three Great Religions and the Plot to End the World (2009)

=== Co-written with Richard Leigh and Henry Lincoln ===
- The Holy Blood and the Holy Grail, 1982, UK ISBN 0-09-968241-9
  - U.S. paperback: Holy Blood, Holy Grail, 1983, Dell. ISBN 0-440-13648-2
- The Messianic Legacy, 1986

=== Co-written with Richard Leigh ===
- The Temple and the Lodge, 1989, ISBN 0-552-13596-8
- The Dead Sea Scrolls Deception, 1991
- Secret Germany: Claus Von Stauffenberg and the true story of Operation Valkyrie, 1994
- The Elixir and the Stone: The Tradition of Magic and Alchemy, 1997
- The Inquisition. 1999

=== Co-written with other authors ===
- The Astrological Journal (Winter 1983–84, Vol. 26, No. 1) with Roy Alexander, Fiona Griffiths, Charles Harvey, Suzi Lilley-Harvey, Esme Williams, David Hamblin, and Zach Mathews, 1983
- Mundane Astrology: Introduction to the Astrology of Nations and Groups (co-written with Nicholas Campion and Charles Harvey) 1984 (reissued expanded edition, 1992)
- Freemasonry Today, (editor) 2001-2011
