= Richard Leigh (author) =

American author (1943–2007)

- Born: Richard Harris Leigh; August 16, 1943; New Jersey, U.S.
- Died: November 21, 2007 (aged 64); London, England
- Education: Tufts University (BA); University of Chicago (MS); Stony Brook University (PhD)
- Occupation: Author
- Known for: Co-author The Holy Blood and the Holy Grail
- Relatives: Liz Greene (sister), an author and astrologer

Richard Harris Leigh (16 August 1943 – 21 November 2007) was a novelist and short story writer born in New Jersey, United States to a British father and an American mother, who spent most of his life in the UK. Leigh earned a BA from Tufts University in 1965, a master's degree from the University of Chicago, and a PhD from the State University of New York at Stony Brook.

== The Holy Blood and the Holy Grail ==
Leigh met his frequent co-author Michael Baigent while living in the United Kingdom in the 1970s. They subsequently struck a friendship with the writer and British television scriptwriter Henry Lincoln in 1975 and between them developed a conspiracy theory involving the Knights Templar and the alleged mystery of Rennes-le-Château, proposing the existence of a secret that Jesus had not died on the Cross, but had married Mary Magdalene and fathered descendants who continued to exert an influence on European history. This hypothesis was later put forward in their 1982 book, The Holy Blood and the Holy Grail.

The Holy Blood and the Holy Grail achieved enormous commercial success and has been described as "one of the most controversial books of the 1980s". It popularised the idea that the true object of the quest for the Holy Grail was to find secret descendants of Jesus and Mary Magdalene. This bloodline is stated to have later married into a Frankish royal dynasty, the Merovingians, and to be championed and protected by a secret society known as the Priory of Sion. These notions were later used as a basis for Dan Brown's international best-selling novel The Da Vinci Code.

The day after publication, the authors had a public clash on BBC television with the Bishop of Birmingham and Marina Warner. The book rapidly climbed the best-seller charts, and the authors published a sequel, The Messianic Legacy, in 1986.

The book has been described as "a work thoroughly debunked by scholars and critics alike". Arthurian scholar Richard Barber has commented, "It would take a book as long as the original to refute and dissect The Holy Blood and the Holy Grail point by point: it is essentially a text which proceeds by innuendo, not by refutable scholarly debate".

== Other works ==
In 1991 Leigh published The Dead Sea Scrolls Deception, co-authored with Baigent. The book follows the controversial theories of Robert Eisenman regarding the Dead Sea Scrolls.

Two books of Leigh's fictional works have been published: Erceldoune & Other Stories (2006), and Grey Magic (2007).

Leigh's short story, "Madonna," was included in "The Random Review, 1982: The Year's Best Fiction, Poetry and Essays" (1982), the first in an anthology series edited by Gary Fisketjon and Jonathan Galassi gathering "the best stories, poems, and essays published in American magazines in the preceding year."

== Dan Brown suit ==
Some of the ideas presented in Baigent's earlier book The Holy Blood and the Holy Grail, were incorporated in the best-selling American novel The Da Vinci Code, by Dan Brown.

In March 2006, Baigent and Leigh filed suit in a British court against Brown's publisher, Random House, claiming copyright infringement. On 7 April 2006 High Court judge Peter Smith rejected the claim. On 28 March 2007, Baigent and Leigh lost their appeal, and were faced with legal bills of about £3m.

== Death ==
Leigh died on 21 November 2007 in London from causes related to a heart condition.

== Works ==
=== Co-written with Michael Baigent and Henry Lincoln ===
- The Holy Blood and the Holy Grail, 1982, UK ISBN 0-09-968241-9
  - U.S. paperback: Holy Blood, Holy Grail, 1983, Dell. ISBN 0-440-13648-2
- The Messianic Legacy, 1986

=== Co-written with Michael Baigent ===
- The Dead Sea Scrolls Deception, 1991
- The Temple and the Lodge, 1991, ISBN 0-552-13596-8
- Secret Germany: Claus Von Stauffenberg and the Mystical Crusade Against Hitler, 1994
- The Elixir and the Stone: The Tradition of Magic and Alchemy, 1997
- The Inquisition. 1999

=== Self published ===
- Erceldoune & Other Stories (2006, ISBN 978-1-4116-9943-4)
- Grey Magic (2007, ISBN 978-0-615-13733-9).
