= Deicide =

Act of killing a god or deity

Deicide is the killing of a god. The concept may be used for any act of killing a god, including a life-death-rebirth deity who is killed and then resurrected.

== Etymology ==
The term deicide was coined in the 17th century from medieval Latin *deicidium, from deus "god" and -cidium "cutting, killing."

== Aztec mythology ==
The Aztec god of war, Tezcatlipoca, tricked his rival Quetzalcoatl into over-drinking and wantonry. Quetzalcoatl burned himself to death in shame.

== Buddhism ==
The crimes listed in the Anantarika-karma include killing an Arhat and shedding the blood of a Buddha.

Devadatta, a monk, and Ajātasattu, king of Magadha, attempted to kill the Gautama Buddha.

== Christianity ==
According to the New Testament accounts, the Judean authorities in Jerusalem under Roman rule, the Pharisees, charged Jesus with blasphemy, a capital crime under biblical law, and sought his execution. According to John 18:31, the Judean authorities claimed to lack the authority to have Jesus put to death, though it is doubtful what legal basis such a claim would have had; the Jesus Seminar historicity project notes for John 18:31: "it's illegal for us: The accuracy of this claim is doubtful." in their Scholars Version. Additionally, John 7:53–8:11 records them asking Jesus about stoning the adulteress and Acts 6:12 records them ordering the stoning of Saint Stephen.

They brought Jesus to Pontius Pilate, the Roman Prefect of Judea, who was hesitant and let the people decide if Jesus were to be executed. According to the Bible, Pontius Pilate only ordered Jesus to be flogged. Washing his hands, Pilate said he would not take the blame for Jesus' death, to which the crowd replied, "His blood is upon us and our children."

Pilate is portrayed in the Gospel accounts as a reluctant accomplice to Jesus' death. Modern scholars say it is most likely that a Roman Governor such as Pilate would have no problem in executing any leader whose followers posed a potential threat to Roman rule. It has also been suggested that the Gospel accounts may have downplayed the role of the Romans in Jesus' death during a time when Christianity was struggling to gain acceptance in the Roman world.

=== Analysis ===
The Catholic Church and other Christian denominations suggest that Jesus' death was necessary to take away the collective sin of the human race. The crucifixion is seen as an example of Christ's eternal love for mankind and as a self-sacrifice on the part of God for humanity.

The Gnostic Gospel of Judas contends that Jesus commanded Judas Iscariot to set in motion the chain of events that would lead to his death.

Against certain Christian movements, some of which rejected the use of Hebrew Scripture, Augustine countered that God had chosen the Jews as a special people, and he considered the scattering of Jewish people by the Roman Empire to be a fulfillment of prophecy. He rejected homicidal attitudes, quoting part of the same prophecy, namely "But do not kill them, O Lord our shield, or my people will forget. In your might make them wander about, and bring them down." (Psalm 59:11). Augustine, who believed Jewish people would be converted to Christianity at "the end of time", argued that God had allowed them to survive their dispersion as a warning to Christians; as such, he argued, they should be permitted to dwell in Christian lands. The sentiment sometimes attributed to Augustine that Christians should let the Jews "survive but not thrive" (it is repeated by author James Carroll in his book Constantine's Sword, for example) is apocryphal and is not found in any of his writings.

== Egyptian mythology ==
Set killed Osiris, who was later resurrected by Isis. In Greek sources, Typhon replaces Set as the murderer.

== Greek mythology ==
Ophiotaurus was a creature whose entrails were said to grant the power to defeat the gods to whoever burned them. The Titans attempted to use them against the Olympians. After learning that his children were destined to usurp him, Cronus devoured his children. However, his children were later freed by Zeus.

== Hawaiian mythology ==
Lanikaula, a prophet, killed the followers of the trickster god Pahulu on Lanai.

== Japanese mythology ==
The goddess of creation, Izanami died while giving birth to the fire god Kagutsuchi. Kagutsuchi's father, Izanagi, beheaded Kagutsuchi out of grief.

== Mesopotamian mythology ==
In Babylonian mythology, Kingu, along with his dragon mother, Tiamat, were slain by the war-god Marduk in the primordial battle of the Enuma Elish. Afterward, the gods mixed Kingu's blood with clay and created humans. A variant of this myth, from the Atra-Hasis epic, says that the minor god Geshtu-E was sacrificed to make humans with his blood.

== Norse mythology ==
Loki tricked Höðr into killing Baldr. Váli avenged Baldr's death by killing Höðr.

Most of the major figures die in Ragnarök. According to the Gylfaginning, Jörmungandr kills Thor by poisoning him, Fenrir kills Odin, while Heimdall and Loki kill each other.

== Popular culture ==
In Phillip Pullman's His Dark Materials trilogy, the main characters inadvertently kill God, known as 'the Authority', when they release him from imprisonment.

In the Star Trek universe, the Klingon creation myth states that the first Klingons waged war against, and ultimately killed, the gods who created them.

== See also ==
- Death of God theology
- Death or departure of the gods
- Dying-and-rising deity
- God is dead
- Ragnarök
- Theomachy
