= Death or departure of the gods =

Motif in mythology

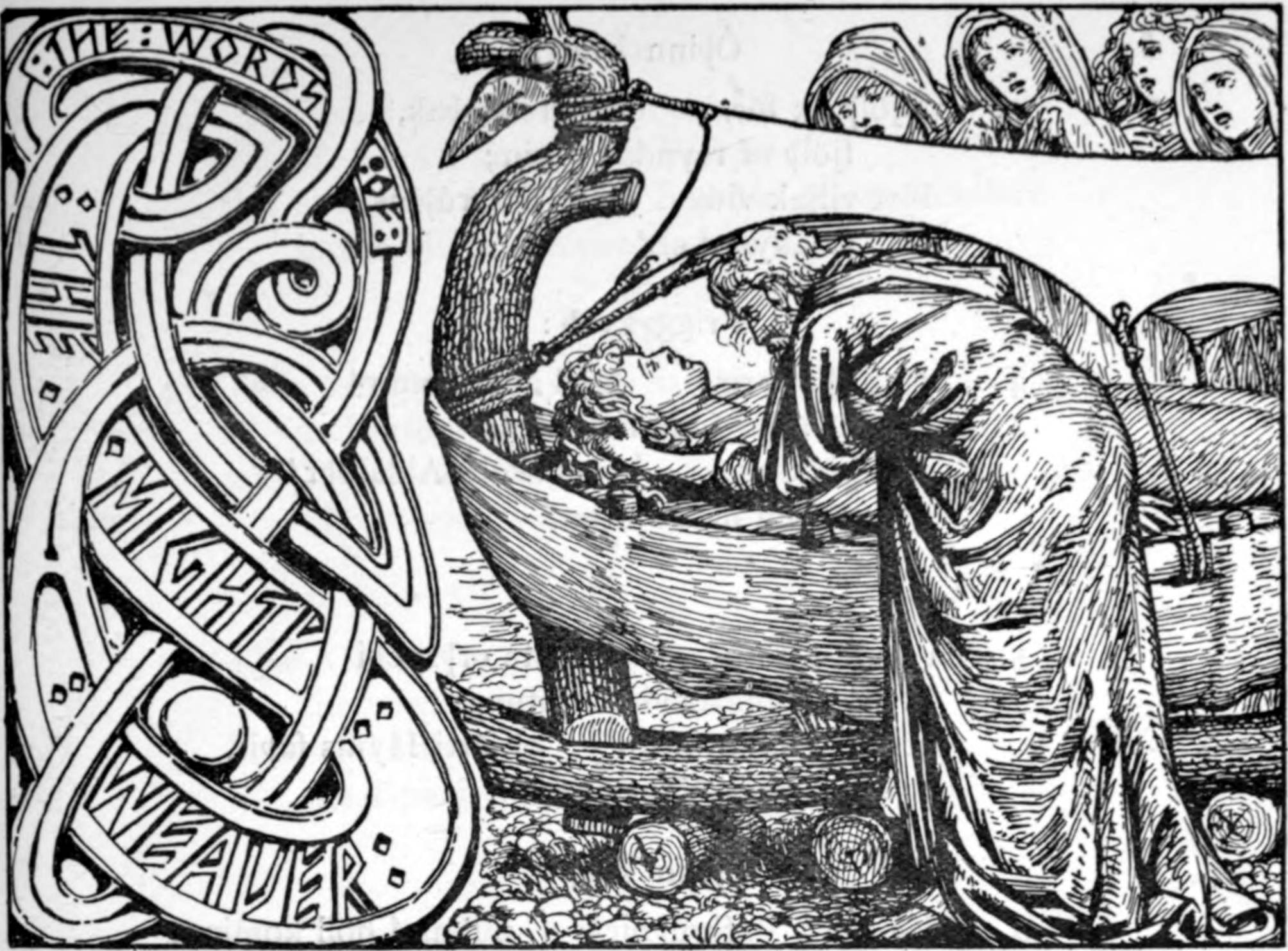
Odin's last words to Baldr (1908) by W.G. Collingwood (1854–1932)

A dying god, or departure of the gods, is a motif in mythology in which one or more gods (of a pantheon) die, are destroyed, or depart permanently from their place on Earth to elsewhere.

Henri Frankfort speaks of the dying god as " The dying God is one of those imaginative conceptions in which early man made his emotional and intellectual preoccupations explicit." Saying the myth of the dying gods is a concept made by man to bring comfort to the concept of death. If gods can die then man can too. The dying god brings comfort in the unknown and makes it known.

== Examples ==
Frequently cited examples of dying gods are Baldr in Norse mythology. A special subcategory is the death of an entire pantheon, the most notable example being Ragnarök in Norse mythology, or Cronus and the Titans from Greek mythology, with other examples from Ireland, India, Hawaii and Tahiti. Examples of the disappearing god in Hattian and Hittite mythology include Telipinu and Hannahanna.

=== Osiris ===
Osiris was killed by his brother Set, who tore his body into 14 pieces and distributed the parts across Egypt. His wife Isis hunted down his body, mummified it, did spell work on it later impregnating herself with Osiris' phallus bringing to life their son Horus. Osiris was no longer able to live in the natural world but due to his revival from Isis’ acts of magic this made Osiris the king of the Underworld.

=== Yama ===
The Hindu god Yama killed himself in his own sacrifice. Alex Wayman says "the fathers dwell in Yamas heaven, and a dead man may or may not arrive at that heaven to be one of the fathers." Yama decided to take his own life in hopes to become the first father of Yamas heaven and making him the Hindu god of death.

=== Izanami ===
Izanami and Izanagi were brother and sister who decided to procreate, once commencing the ritual Izanami had told Izanagi how to start the ritual, once it had been done their baby came out a leech whom they denied and placed in a reed basket and floated it away down the river. The two asked the gods what went wrong and they said the woman is to not speak first during the ritual and to try again, so they did. Later the two had another child, a fire deity who would kill Izanami during child birth. Izanagi goes to Yomi (Japanese world of the dead) to bring his wife back but she had changed too much and he decides not to, hurting Izanami and leading her to hunt Izanagi down in which he escapes her.

"Death or departure of the gods" is motif A192 in Stith Thompson's Motif-Index of Folk-Literature, with the following subcategories:

A192.1. Death of the gods (also F259.1. Mortality of fairies)

A192.1.1. Old god slain by young god. (also A525.2. Culture hero (god) slays his grandfather)
A192.1.2. God killed and eaten (theophagy)

A192.2. Departure of gods (also A560. Culture hero's (demi-god's) departure)

A192.2.1. Deity departs for heaven (skies).

A192.2.1.1. Deity departs for moon.

A192.2.2. Divinity departs in boat over sea.
A192.2.3. Divinity departs to submarine home.
A192.2.4. Divinity departs in column of flame.

A192.3. Expected return of deity.
A192.4. Divinity becomes mortal.

A separate (although related and overlapping) category are gods who die and are also resurrected (Thompson's motif A193), see Dying-and-rising god.

== See also ==
- Death deity
- Descent to the underworld
- Dionysus in comparative mythology
- Dying-and-rising god
