= Death and Rebirth =

Death and Rebirth may refer to:

- Reincarnation, the philosophical or religious concept that the soul or spirit, after biological death, can begin a new life in a new body
- The Hero with a Thousand Faces, 1949 work of comparative mythology by Joseph Campbell
- Dying-and-rising god, a religious motif in which a god dies and is resurrected
- Ego death, a loss of subjective self-identity that may be a part of religious or psychedelic experience
- Neon Genesis Evangelion: Death & Rebirth, a 1997 Japanese animated science fiction film
