= Intellitar =

Intellitar, Inc.
- Developer(s): Intellitar Inc. Huntsville, Alabama
- Type: Website and client-side intelligent avatars
- License: Commercial proprietary software
- Website: www.intellitar.com

Intellitar, Inc. was a company based in Huntsville, Alabama, known for its development of the Intelligent Avatar Platform (IAP). This new technology facilitated the creation and use of digital avatars, referred to as Intellitars. These digital avatars had features that differentiated them from conventional chatbot avatars at the time. Intellitars were built with a customizable nature that allowed for a variety of use cases.

== Development ==
The creation of IAP technology began in early 2007, with development efforts split between Huntsville, Alabama and Los Angeles, California. The primary objective was to engineer an avatar that mirrored its user in appearance, personality, sound, and movements. Additionally, IAP was supposed to provide an experience indistinguishable from human communication, with the ultimate goal of passing the Turing Test. Users could only create an Intellitar with IAP technology via the "Virtual Eternity" platform.

== Closure ==
In 2012, Intellitar, Inc. was forced to cease operations due to legal disputes over the intellectual property of the technology it utilized. This closure marked the end of the company's goal to improve digital interactions with personalized digital avatars.
