= Dying-and-rising god =

Religious motif in which a deity dies and is resurrected

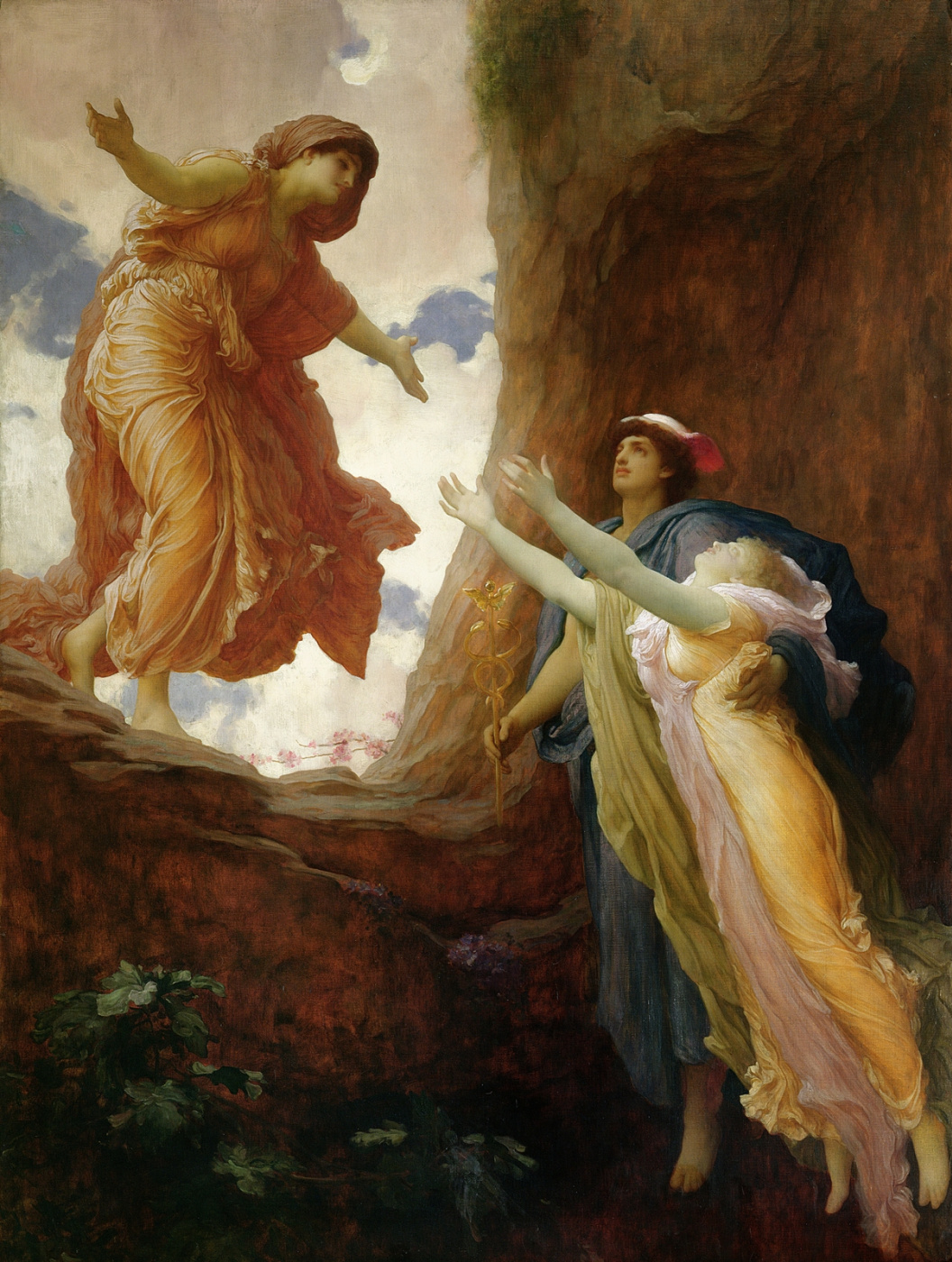
- The Return of Persephone by Frederic Leighton (1891)
- Description: A dying-and-rising god is born, suffers a death-like experience, and is subsequently reborn.
- Proponents: James Frazer, Carl Jung, Tryggve Mettinger
- Subject: Mythology; Religion

A dying-and-rising god, life–death–rebirth deity, or resurrection deity is a religious motif in which a god or goddess dies and is resurrected. Examples of gods who die and later return to life are most often cited from the religions of the ancient Near East. The traditions influenced by them include the Greco-Roman mythology. The concept of a dying-and-rising god was first proposed in comparative mythology by James Frazer's seminal The Golden Bough (1890). Frazer associated the motif with fertility rites surrounding the yearly cycle of vegetation. Frazer cited the examples of Osiris, Tammuz, Adonis and Attis, Zagreus, Dionysus, and Jesus.

Frazer's interpretation of the category has been critically discussed in 20th-century scholarship, to the conclusion that many examples from the world's mythologies included by Frazer under "dying and rising" should only be considered "dying" but not "rising", and that the genuine dying-and-rising god is a characteristic feature of ancient Near Eastern mythologies and the derived mystery cults of late antiquity. "Death or departure of the gods" is motif A192 in Stith Thompson's Motif-Index of Folk-Literature (1932), and "resurrection of gods" is motif A193.

== Overview ==
The motif of a dying deity appears within the mythology of diverse cultures – perhaps because attributes of deities were derived from everyday experiences, and the ensuing conflicts often included death. These examples include Baldr in Norse mythology and the feathered serpent Quetzalcoatl in Aztec mythology to the Japanese Izanami.

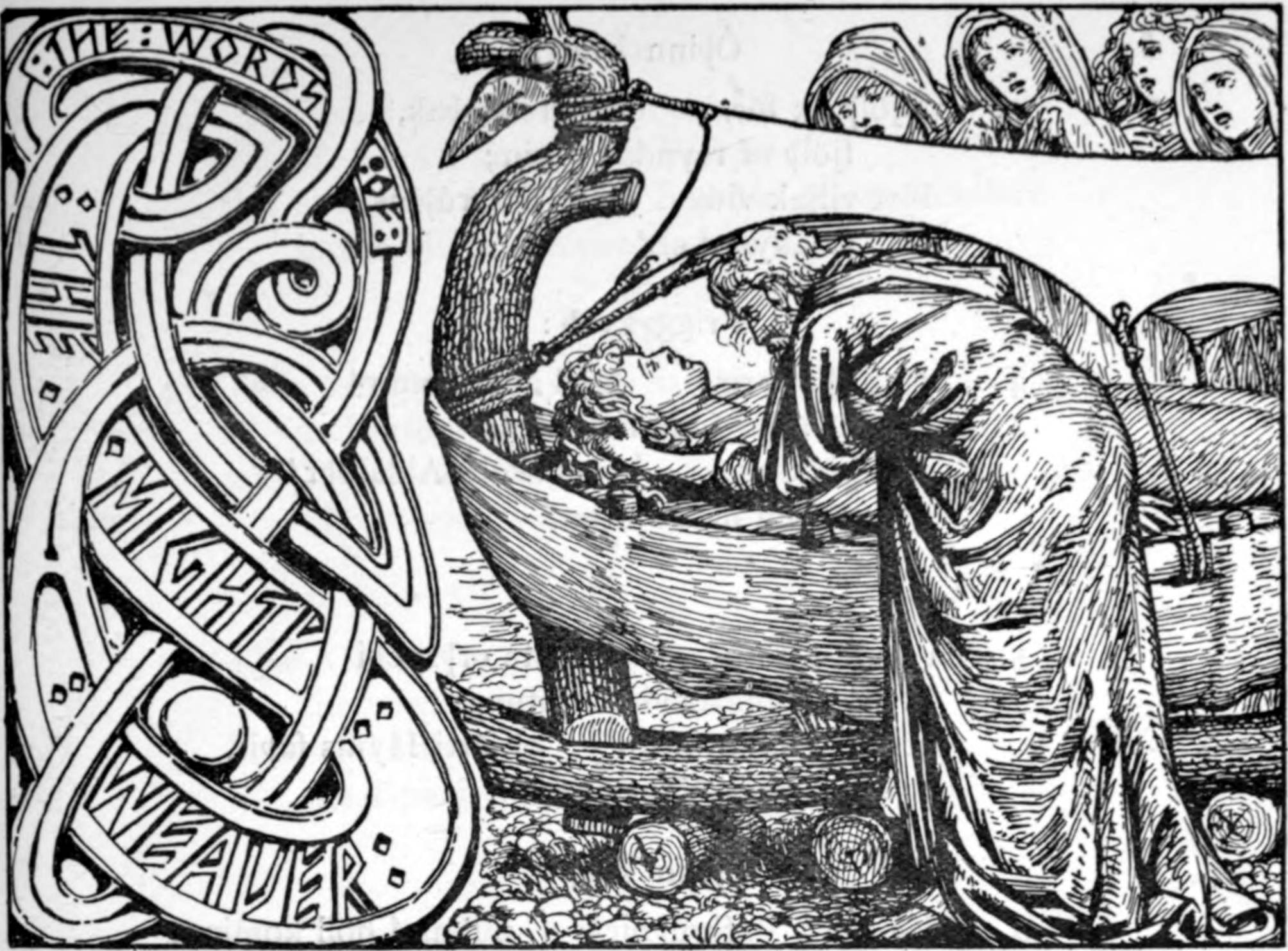
Odin whispers to a dead Baldr as he is to be sent out to sea.

The methods of death vary. In Germanic mythology, for example, Baldr (whose account was likely first written down in the 12th century), is inadvertently killed by his blind brother Höðr who is tricked into shooting a mistletoe-tipped arrow at him. Baldr's body is then set aflame on a ship as it sails out to sea. Baldr does not come back to life because not all living creatures shed tears for him, and his death then leads to the "doom of the gods".

By contrast, most variations of Quetzalcoatl's story (first written down in the 16th century) have Quetzalcoatl tricked by Tezcatlipoca to over-drink and then burn himself to death out of remorse for his own shameful deeds. Quetzalcoatl does not resurrect and come back to life as himself, but some versions of his story have a flock of birds flying away from his ashes. In some variants, Quetzalcoatl sails away on the ocean never to return.

Hawaiian deities can die and depart the world in a number of ways. Some gods who were killed on Lanai by Lanikuala departed for the skies. In contrast, Kaili leaves the world by canoe and is never seen again. The Japanese god Izanami dies giving birth to the child Kagu-tsuchi (incarnation of fire) or Ho-Musubi (causer of fire) and Izanagi goes to Yomi, the land of gloom, to retrieve her, but she has already changed to a deteriorated state and Izanagi will not bring her back, and she pursues Izanagi, but he manages to escape.

Some traditions tie the cycle of life and death brought about by the seasons to deities which themselves undergo a cycle of death and rebirth. In effect, these gods take the form of a vegetation deity. Examples include Ishtar and Persephone, who die every year. The annual death of Ishtar when she goes underground represents the lack of growth, and her return represents the rebirth of the farming cycle. Most scholars hold that although the gods suggested in this motif die, they do not generally return in terms of rising as the same deity, although scholars such as Mettinger contend that in some cases they do.

== Development ==
The term "dying god" is associated with the works of James Frazer, Jane Ellen Harrison, and their fellow Cambridge Ritualists. At the end of the 19th century, in their The Golden Bough and Prolegomena to the Study of Greek Religion, Frazer and Harrison argued that all myths are echoes of rituals, and that all rituals have as their primordial purpose the manipulation of natural phenomena.

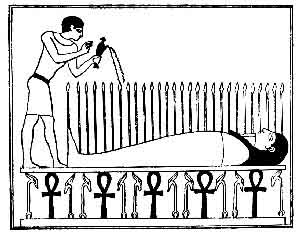
The Osiris-bed is where he renews the harvest cycle in Egypt.

Early in the 20th century, Gerald Massey argued that there are similarities between the Egyptian dying-and-rising god myths and Jesus, but Massey's factual errors often render his works mistaken. For example, Massey stated that the biblical references to Herod the Great were based on the myth of "Herrut" the evil hydra serpent. However, the existence of Herod the Great is well established independently of Christian sources.

The Swiss psychoanalyst Carl Jung argued that archetypal processes such as death and resurrection were part of the "trans-personal symbolism" of the collective unconscious, and could be utilized in the task of psychological integration. He also proposed that the myths of the pagan gods who symbolically died and resurrected foreshadowed Christ's literal/physical death and resurrection. The overall view of Jung regarding religious themes and stories is that they are expressions of events occurring in the unconscious of the individuals – regardless of their historicity. From the symbolic perspective, Jung sees dying and rising gods as an archetypal process resonating with the collective unconscious through which the rising god becomes the greater personality in the Jungian self. In Jung's view, a biblical story such as the resurrection of Jesus (which he saw as a case of dying and rising) may be true or not, but that has no relevance to the psychological analysis of the process, and its impact.

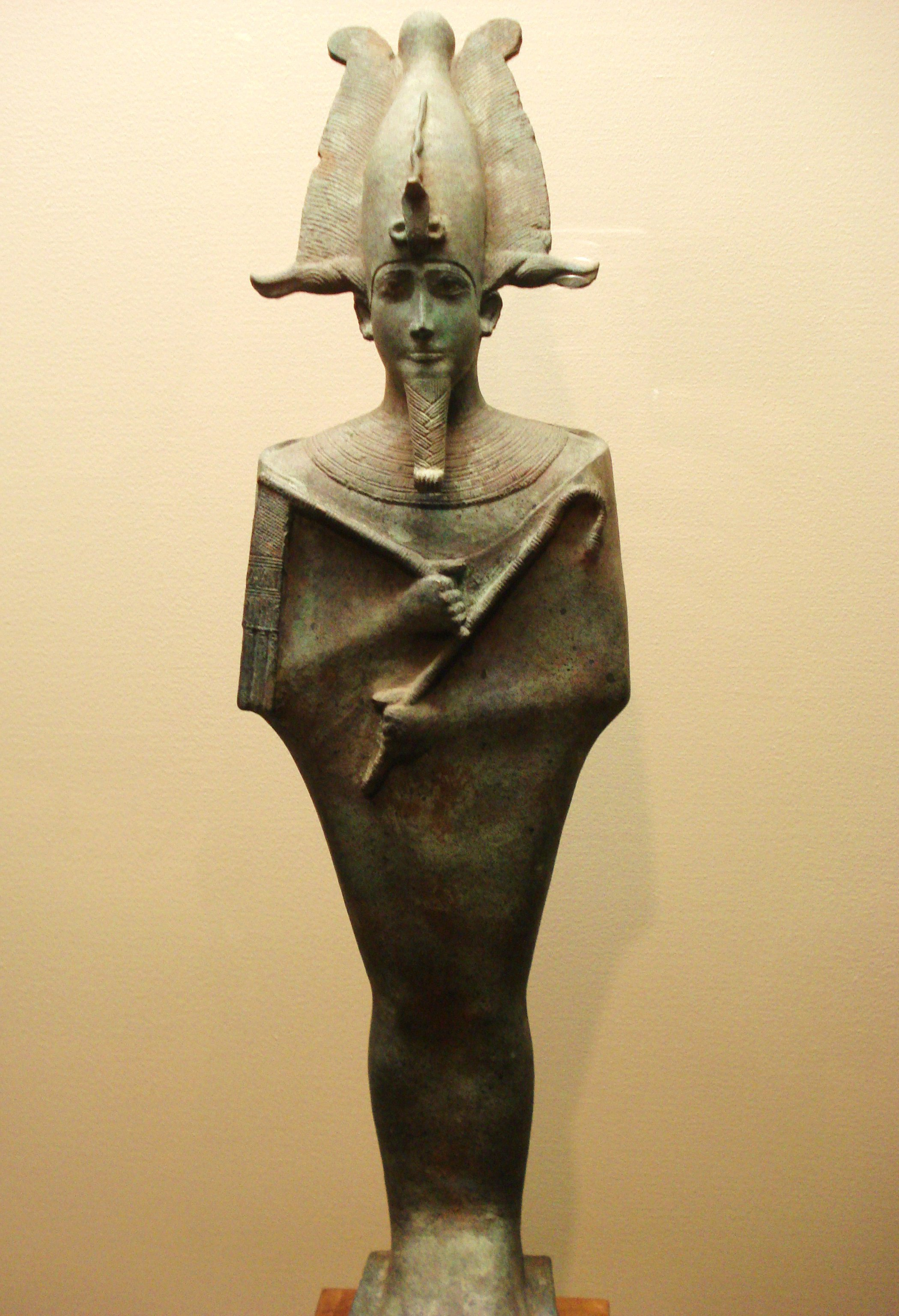
Bronze figurine of Osiris

The analysis of Osiris permeates the later religious psychology of Carl Jung more than any other element. In 1950 Jung wrote that those who partake in the Osiris myth festival and follow the ritual of his death and the scattering of his body to restart the vegetation cycle as a rebirth "experience the permanence and continuity of life which outlasts all changes of form". Jung wrote that Osiris provided the key example of the rebirth process in that initially only the Pharaohs "had an Osiris" but later other Egyptians nobles acquired it and eventually it led in the concept of soul for all individuals in Christianity. Jung believed that Christianity itself derived its significance from the archetypal relationship between Osiris and Horus versus God the Father and Jesus, his son. However, Jung also postulated that the rebirth applied to Osiris (the father), and not Horus, the son.

The general applicability of the death and resurrection of Osiris to the dying-and-rising-god analogy has been criticized, on the grounds that it derived from the harvesting rituals that related the rising and receding waters of the Nile river and the farming cycle. The cutting down of barley and wheat was related to the death of Osiris, and the sprouting of shoots was thought to be based on the power of Osiris to resurrect the farmland. In general rebirth analogies based on the vegetation cycle are viewed as the weakest elements in the death-rebirth analogies.

In Greek mythology, Dionysus, the son of Zeus, was a horned child who was torn to pieces by Titans who lured him with toys, then boiled and ate him. Zeus then destroyed the Titans by thunderbolt as a result of their action against Dionysus and from the ashes humans were formed. However, Dionysus' grandmother Rhea managed to put some of his pieces back together (principally from his heart that was spared) and brought him back to life. In other Orphic tales, Zagreus is depicted as the son of Hades and Persephone, and is the god of rebirth. Scholars such as Barry Powell have suggested Dionysus as an example of resurrection.

The oldest known example of the "dying god rising myth" is the Sumerian myth of Inanna's Descent to the Underworld. The Sumerian goddess Inanna travels to the Underworld to see her sister Ereshkigal. While there, she is "struck down" and turns into a corpse. For three days and three nights, Inanna is dead, until she is resurrected with the help of her father, Enki, who sends the two galla to bring her back. The galla serve Inanna food and water and bring her back to life.

== Scholarly criticism ==
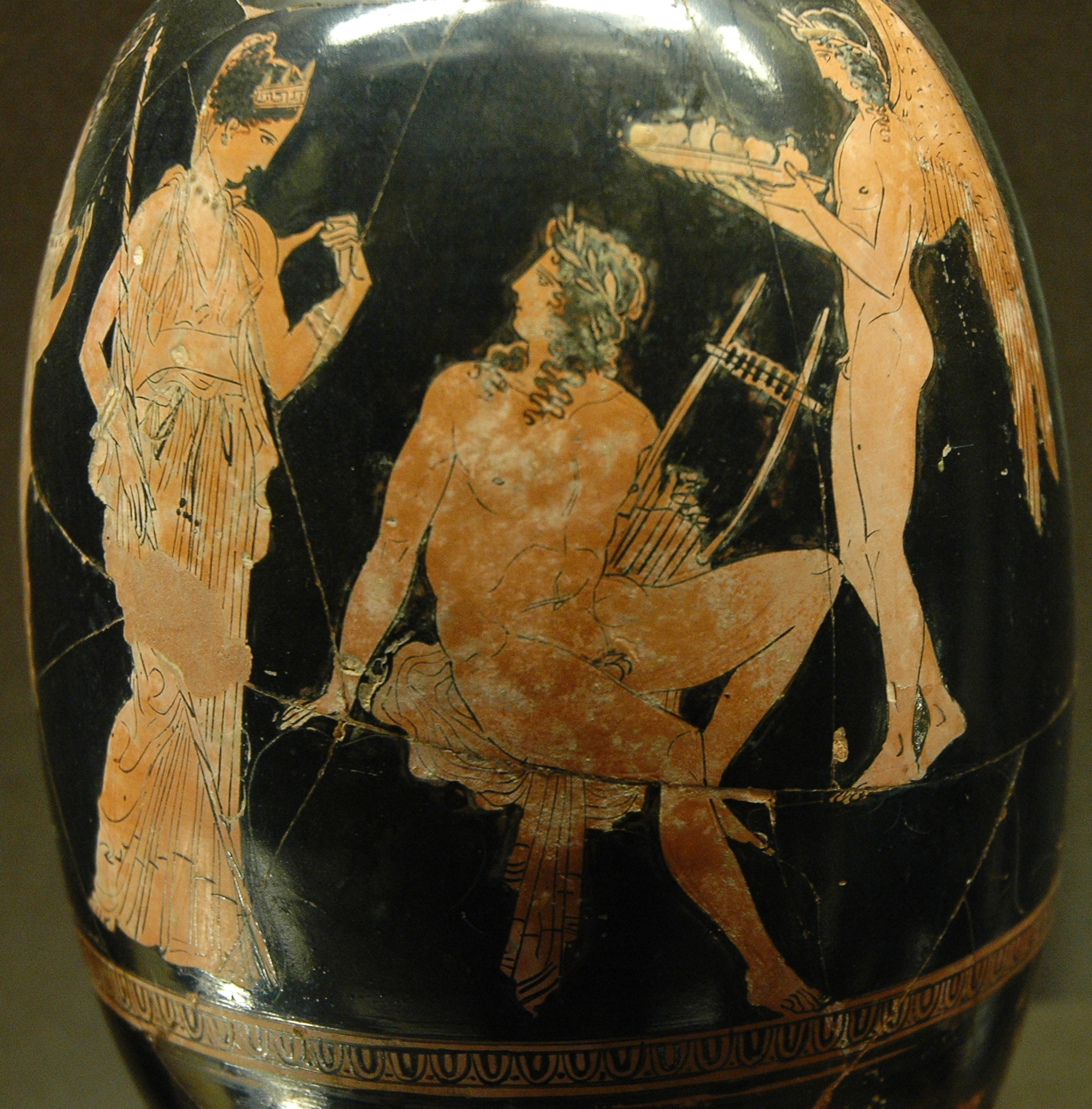
Aphrodite and Adonis, c. 410 BC, are at the Louvre.

The category "dying-and-rising-god" was debated throughout the 20th century, and most modern scholars questioned its ubiquity in the world's mythologies. By the end of the 20th century the scholarly consensus was that most of the gods Frazer listed as "dying-and-rising" only died and did not rise. Kurt Rudolph in 1986 argued that the oft-made connection between the mystery religions and the idea of dying and rising divinities is defective. Gerald O'Collins states that surface-level application of analogous symbolism is a case of parallelomania which exaggerates the importance of trifling resemblances, long abandoned by mainstream scholars. Against this view, Mettinger (2001) affirms that many of the gods of the mystery religions do indeed die, descend to the underworld, are lamented and retrieved by a woman and restored to life.

Though the concept of a "dying-and-rising god" has a longer history, it was significantly advocated by Frazer's Golden Bough (1906–1914). At first received very favourably, the idea was attacked by Roland de Vaux in 1933, and was the subject of controversial debate over the following decades. One of the leading scholars in the deconstruction of Frazer's "dying-and-rising god" category was Jonathan Z. Smith, whose 1969 dissertation discusses Frazer's Golden Bough, and who in Mircea Eliade's 1987 Encyclopedia of religion wrote the "Dying and rising gods" entry, where he dismisses the category as "largely a misnomer based on imaginative reconstructions and exceedingly late or highly ambiguous texts", suggesting a more detailed categorisation into "dying gods" and "disappearing gods", arguing that before Christianity, the two categories were distinct and gods who "died" did not return, and those who returned never truly "died".

Smith gave a more detailed account of his views specifically on the question of parallels to Christianity in Drudgery Divine (1990). Smith's 1987 article was widely received, and during the 1990s, scholarly consensus seemed to shift towards his rejection of the concept as oversimplified, although it continued to be invoked by scholars writing about ancient Near Eastern mythology.

Beginning with an overview of the Athenian ritual of growing and withering herb gardens at the Adonis festival, in his book The Gardens of Adonis Marcel Detienne suggests that rather than being a stand-in for crops in general (and therefore the cycle of death and rebirth), these herbs (and Adonis) were part of a complex of associations in the Greek mind that centered on spices. These associations included seduction, trickery, gourmandizing, and the anxieties of childbirth. From his point of view, Adonis's death is only one datum among the many that must be used to analyze the festival, the myth, and the god.

A main criticism charges the group of analogies with reductionism, in that it subsumes a range of disparate myths under a single category and ignores important distinctions. Detienne argues that it risks making Christianity the standard by which all religion is judged, since death and resurrection are more central to Christianity than many other faiths. Dag Øistein Endsjø, a scholar of religion, points out how a number of those often defined as dying-and-rising-deities, such as a number of figures in ancient Greek religion, actually died as ordinary mortals, only to become gods of various stature after they were resurrected from the dead. Not dying as gods, they thus defy the definition of "dying-and-rising-gods".

Tryggve Mettinger supports the category of dying and rising gods, and stated in 2001 that there was a scholarly consensus that the category is inappropriate. As of 2009, the Encyclopedia of Psychology and Religion summarizes the current scholarly consensus as ambiguous, with some scholars rejecting Frazer's "broad universalist category" preferring to emphasize the differences between the various traditions, but others continue to view the category as applicable.

In the 2010s and 2020s, Paola Corrente conducted an extensive survey of the status of the dying and rising god category. Though she agrees that much of Frazer's specific evidence was faulty, she argues that the category as a whole is valid, though she suggests modifications to the specific criteria. Corrente specifically focuses her attention on several Near Eastern and Mesopotamian gods as examples which she argues have been largely ignored, both by Frazer (who would not have had access to most relevant texts) and his more recent critics. These examples include the goddess Inanna in Sumerian texts and Ba'al in Ugaritic texts, whose myths, Corrente argues, offer concrete examples of death and resurrection. Corrente also utilizes the example of Dionysus, whose connection to the category is more complicated, but has still been largely ignored or mischaracterized by other scholars including Frazer himself in her view.

== See also ==
- Apotheosis
- Death or departure of the gods
- Deicide
- Dumuzid
- Katabasis
- Mytheme
- Ouroboros
- Pandeism
- Reincarnation
