= Resurrection =

Concept of coming back to life

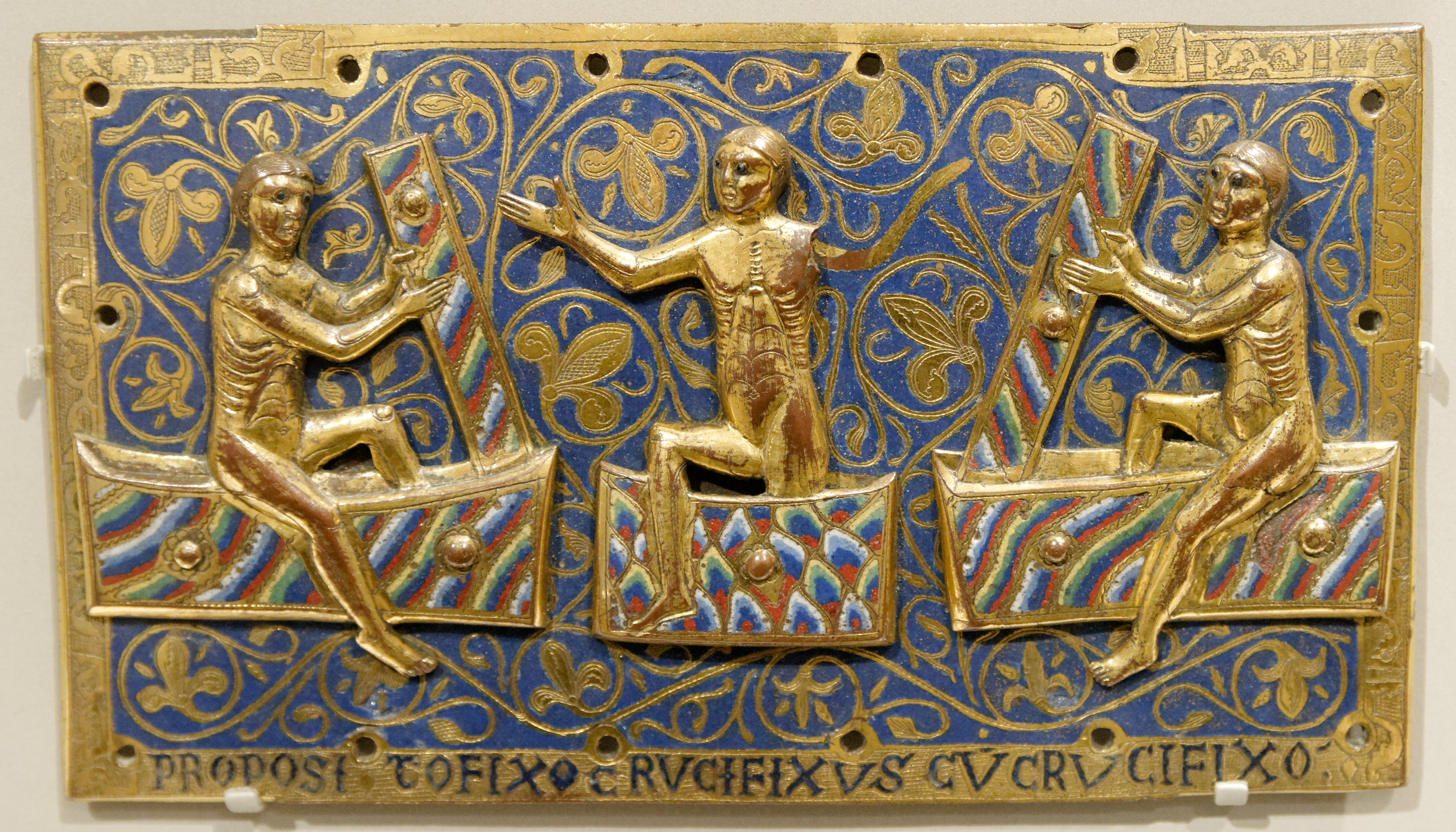
Plaque depicting saints rising from their tombs

Resurrection or anastasis (Greek: ἀνάστασις, romanized: anástasis) is the concept of coming back to life after death. This differs from reincarnation, a process involving a person or deity returning to life in a different body. Some religions also include beliefs about the disappearance, or assumption, of the body, which is a related but distinct concept. The English word derives from the Latin resurrectio, from surgere, "to rise".

With the advent of written records, the earliest known recurrent theme of resurrection was in Egyptian and Canaanite religions, which had cults of dying-and-rising gods such as Osiris and Baal. Ancient Greek religion generally emphasised immortality, but in the mythos, a number of individuals were made physically immortal as they were resurrected from the dead. Frazer treated these as a single dying-and-rising god pattern, a reading many later scholars have held to distort the sources. Figures such as Achilles, Alcmene and Heracles were held to have been raised to physical immortality, though Greek attitudes to returning from death were generally negative: Asclepius was killed by Zeus for reviving the dead.

In the Hebrew Bible resurrection is rare and unsystematic, confined to a few prophetic miracles and to Daniel; the afterlife is more often framed in terms of Sheol. Beliefs diversified in the Second Temple period, with bodily resurrection affirmed in 2 Maccabees, accepted by the Pharisees and rejected by the Sadducees, and it was later fixed by Maimonides among the Thirteen Principles of Faith.

The universal resurrection of the dead at the end of the world is a standard eschatological belief in the Abrahamic religions. The term is used in two distinct senses: the ongoing, individual resurrection of individual souls, as in Christian idealism and realized eschatology; and a general bodily resurrection of all the dead at the end of the world. Some hold that the soul is the vehicle by which people are resurrected. Early Christianity inherited the Pharisaic belief, and the resurrection of Jesus became its central doctrine; Paul held the faith to stand or fall with it. The New Testament also records resurrection miracles worked by Jesus, among them the raising of Lazarus, and by the apostles after him. Belief in a general resurrection and judgment is codified in the Apostles' Creed and Nicene Creed.

Like some forms of the Abrahamic religions, the Dharmic religions also include belief in resurrection and/or reincarnation. Hinduism and Buddhism centre on saṃsāra and rebirth rather than resurrection, though both preserve stories of the dead restored to life, such as Savitri's recovery of her husband from Yama and the vanishing of the Chan master Puhua from his coffin.

Aside from religious belief, cryonics and other speculative resurrection technologies are practiced, but the resurrection of long-dead bodies is not considered possible at the current level of scientific knowledge. Philosophers including John Hick have defended bodily resurrection through "replica" and counterpart theories, in which God recreates a body continuous with the person but not identical to the one that died. Speculative technological versions have also been proposed, among them cryonics, widely regarded as pseudoscience, digital immortality schemes advanced by Hans Moravec and Ray Kurzweil, and Frank J. Tipler's Omega Point cosmology; reviving the long dead remains beyond current science.

== Etymology ==
Resurrection, from the Latin noun resurrectio -onis, from the verb rego, "to make straight, rule" + preposition sub, "under", altered to subrigo and contracted to surgo, surrexi, surrectum ("to rise", "get up", "stand up") + preposition re-, "again", thus literally "a straightening from under again".

== Religion ==
=== Ancient religions in the Near East ===
The concept of resurrection is found in the writings of some ancient non-Abrahamic religions in the Middle East. A few extant Egyptian and Canaanite writings allude to dying-and-rising gods such as Osiris and Baal. Sir James Frazer, in his book The Golden Bough, relates to these dying-and-rising gods, but many of his examples, according to various scholars, distort the sources. Taking a more positive position, Tryggve Mettinger argues in his book that the category of rise and return to life is significant for Ugaritic Baal, Melqart, Adonis, Eshmun, Osiris and Dumuzi.

=== Ancient Greek religion ===
In ancient Greek religion, a number of men and women have been interpreted as being resurrected and made immortal. Achilles, after being killed, was snatched from his funeral pyre by his divine mother, Thetis, and brought to an immortal existence in Leuce, the Elysian plains, or the Islands of the Blessed. Memnon, who was killed by Achilles, seems to have received a similar fate. Alcmene, Castor, Heracles, and Melicertes are also among the figures interpreted to have been resurrected to physical immortality. According to Herodotus's Histories, the seventh-century BC sage Aristeas of Proconnesus was first found dead, after which his body disappeared from a locked room. He would reappear alive years later. However, Greek attitudes toward resurrection were generally negative, and resurrection was considered neither desirable nor possible. For example, Asclepius was killed by Zeus for using herbs to resurrect the dead, but, by his father Apollo's request, was subsequently immortalized as a star.

Many other figures, like a great part of those who fought in the Trojan War and Theban War, Menelaus, and the historical prizefighter Cleomedes of Astupalaea, were also believed to have been made physically immortal, but without having died in the first place. Indeed, in Greek religion, immortality originally always included an eternal union of body and soul. Alcestis undergoes something akin to a resurrection in her escape from the underworld, but without achieving immortality.

Writing his Lives of Illustrious Men (Parallel Lives) in the first century, the Middle Platonic philosopher Plutarch in his chapter on Romulus gave an account of the king's mysterious disappearance and subsequent deification, comparing it to Greek tales such as the physical immortalization of Alcmene and Aristeas the Proconnesian, "for they say Aristeas died in a fuller's work-shop, and his friends coming to look for him, found his body vanished; and that some presently after, coming from abroad, said they met him traveling towards Croton". Plutarch openly scorned such beliefs held in ancient Greek religion, writing, "many such improbabilities do your fabulous writers relate, deifying creatures naturally mortal." Likewise, he writes that while something within humans comes from the gods and returns to them after death, this happens "only when it is most completely separated and set free from the body, and becomes altogether pure, fleshless, and undefiled."

The parallel between these traditional beliefs and the later belief in the resurrection of Jesus was not lost on the early Christians, as Justin Martyr argued: "When we say ... Jesus Christ, our teacher, was crucified and died, and rose again, and ascended into heaven, we propose nothing different from what you believe regarding those whom you consider sons of Zeus." (1 Apol. 21).

=== Buddhism ===
There are stories in Buddhism where the power of resurrection was allegedly demonstrated in Chan or Zen tradition. One is the legend of Bodhidharma, the Indian master who brought the Ekayana school of India that subsequently became Chan Buddhism to China.

The other is the passing of Chinese Chan master Puhua (Japanese: Jinshu Fuke), recounted in the Record of Linji (Japanese: Rinzai Gigen). Puhua was known for his unusual behavior and teaching style. Hence, it is no wonder that he is associated with an event that breaks the usual prohibition on displaying such powers. This is the account from Irmgard Schloegl's "The Zen Teaching of Rinzai":

One day at the street market Fuke was begging all and sundry to give him a robe. Everybody offered him one, but he did not want any of them. The master [Linji] made the superior buy a coffin, and when Fuke returned, said to him: "There, I had this robe made for you." Fuke shouldered the coffin, and went back to the street market, calling loudly: "Rinzai had this robe made for me! I am off to the East Gate to enter transformation" [to die]." The people of the market crowded after him, eager to look. Fuke said: "No, not today. Tomorrow, I shall go to the South Gate to enter transformation." And so for three days. Nobody believed it any longer. On the fourth day, and now without any spectators, Fuke went alone outside the city walls, and laid himself into the coffin. He asked a traveler who chanced by to nail down the lid.

The news spread at once, and the people of the market rushed there. On opening the coffin, they found that the body had vanished, but from high up in the sky they heard the ring of his hand bell.

=== Christianity ===
In Christianity, resurrection most importantly concerns the resurrection of Jesus but also includes the resurrection of Judgment Day, known as the resurrection of the dead by those Christians who subscribe to the Nicene Creed (which is the majority of mainstream Christianity), as well as the resurrection miracles done by Jesus and the prophets of the Old Testament (Hebrew Bible).

==== Resurrection miracles ====
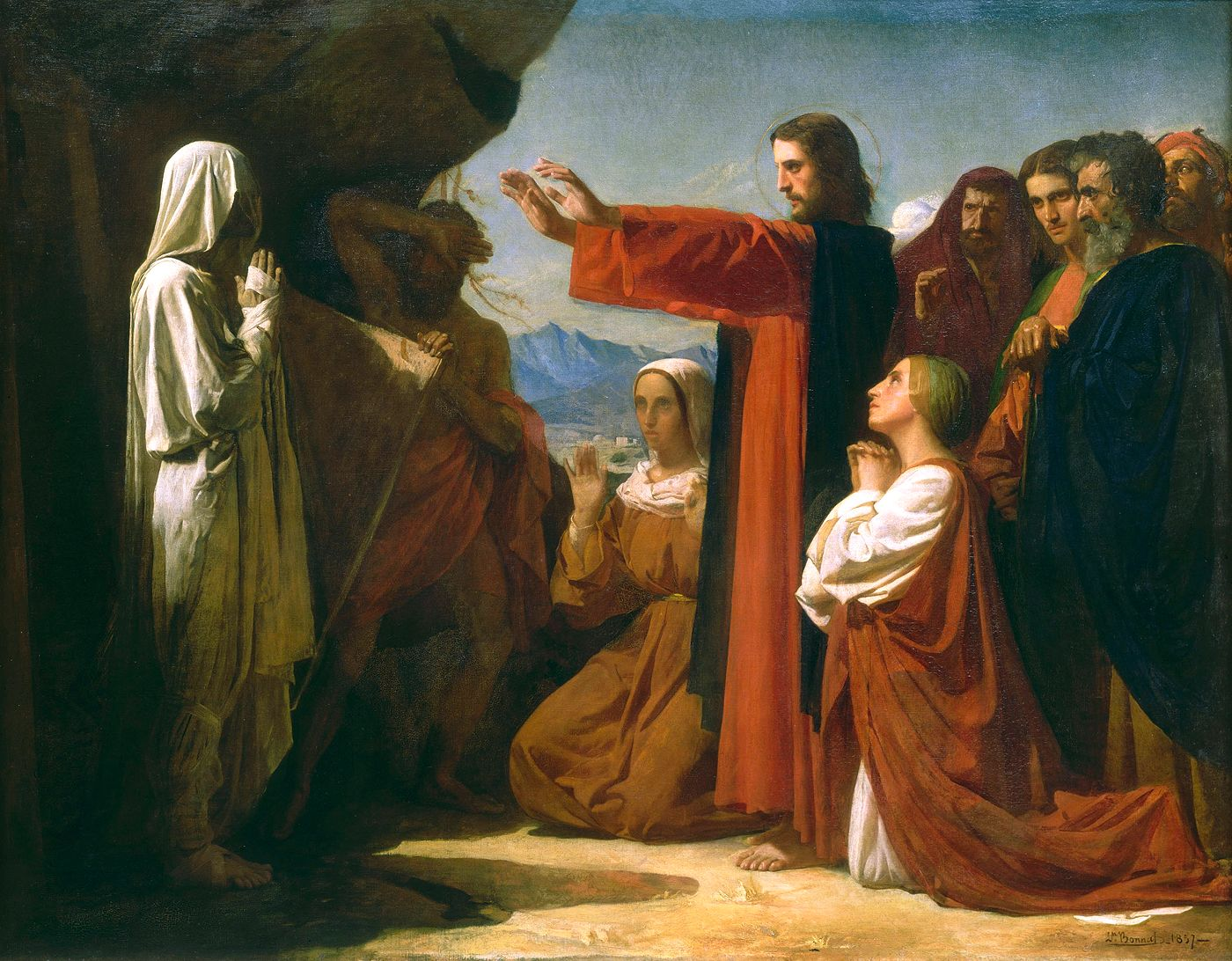
The Resurrection of Lazarus, painting by Leon Bonnat, France, 1857

In the New Testament, Jesus is said to have raised several persons from death. These resurrections included the daughter of Jairus shortly after death, a young man in the midst of his own funeral procession, and Lazarus of Bethany, who had been buried for four days.

During the Ministry of Jesus on earth, before his death, Jesus commissioned his Twelve Apostles to, among other things, raise the dead.

Similar resurrections are credited to the apostles and Catholic saints. In the Acts of the Apostles, Saint Peter raised a woman named Dorcas (also called Tabitha), and Paul the Apostle revived a man named Eutychus who had fallen asleep and fell from a window to his death. According to the Gospel of Matthew, after Jesus's resurrection, many of those previously dead came out of their tombs and entered Jerusalem, where they appeared to many. Following the Apostolic Age, many saints were said to resurrect the dead, as recorded in Orthodox Christian hagiographies. St. Columba supposedly raised a boy from the dead in the land of Picts and St. Nicholas is said to have resurrected pickled children from a brine barrel during a famine by making the sign of the cross.

Both Josephus and the New Testament record that the Sadducees did not believe in an afterlife, but the sources vary on the beliefs of the Pharisees. The New Testament says that the Pharisees believed in the resurrection, but does not specify whether this included the flesh or not. According to Josephus, who himself was a Pharisee, the Pharisees held that only the soul was immortal and the souls of good people will "pass into other bodies", while "the souls of the wicked will suffer eternal punishment." Paul the Apostle, who also was a Pharisee, said that at the resurrection what is "sown as a natural body is raised a spiritual body." The Book of Jubilees seems to refer to the resurrection of the soul only, or to a more general idea of an immortal soul.

==== Resurrection of Jesus ====
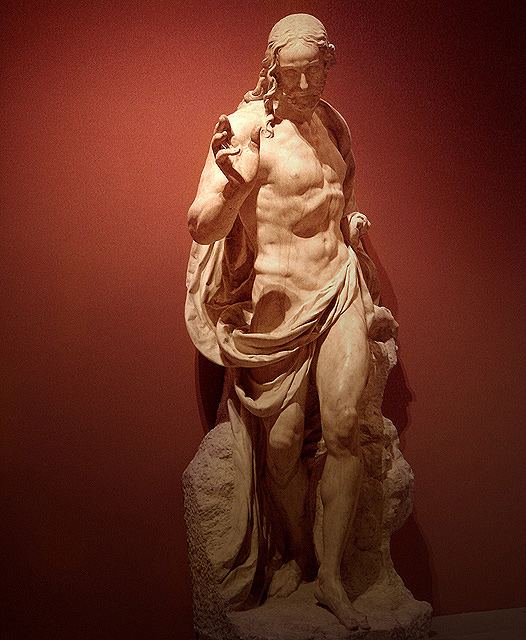
A marble representation of the Resurrection of Jesus Christ, Germain Pilon, before 1572; currently held in the Louvre collection

Christians regard the resurrection of Jesus as the central doctrine in Christianity. Others take the incarnation of Jesus to be more central; however, it is the miracles – and particularly his resurrection – which provide validation of his incarnation. According to Paul the Apostle, the entire Christian faith hinges upon the centrality of the resurrection of Jesus and the hope for life after death. Paul wrote in his first letter to the Corinthians: "If only for this life we have hope in Christ, we are to be pitied more than all men. But Christ has indeed been raised from the dead, the first fruits of those who have fallen asleep.

Rudolf Bultmann argued that many theological concepts later associated with Jesus’ resurrection drew upon preexisting mythological and religious traditions. He suggested that early Christian communities applied longstanding motifs—such as the suffering and redeeming divine figure—to the historical person of Jesus of Nazareth.

==== Resurrection of the dead ====
Christianity started as a religious movement within 1st-century Judaism (late Second Temple Judaism), and it retains what the New Testament itself claims was the Pharisaic belief in the afterlife and resurrection of the dead. Whereas this belief was only one of many beliefs held about the world to come in Second Temple Judaism, it was notably rejected by the Sadducees but accepted by the Pharisees (Acts 23:6–8). Belief in the resurrection became dominant within Early Christianity, and already in the Gospels of Luke and John included an insistence on the resurrection of the flesh. Most modern Christian churches continue to uphold the belief that there will be a final resurrection of the dead and world to come.

Belief in the resurrection of the dead, and Jesus's role as judge, is codified in the Apostles' Creed, the fundamental creed of Christian baptismal faith. The Book of Revelation also makes many references about the Judgment Day, when the dead will be raised.

=== Hinduism ===
There are folklore, stories, and extractions from Hindu holy texts that refer to resurrections. One major legend is that of Savitri saving her husband's life from Yamraj. In the Ramayana, after Ravana was slain by Rama in a great battle between good and evil, Rama requests the king of Devas, Indra, to restore the lives of all the monkeys who died in the great battle Mahavatar Babaji and Lahiri Mahasaya are also believed to have resurrected themselves.

=== Islam ===
Belief in the Day of Resurrection (yawm al-qiyāmah) is also crucial for Muslims. They believe the time of Qiyāmah is preordained by God but unknown to man. The trials and tribulations preceding and during the Qiyāmah are described in the Quran and the hadith, and also in the commentaries of scholars. The Quran emphasizes bodily resurrection, a break from the pre-Islamic Arabian understanding of death.

According to Nasir Khusraw (d. after 1070), an Ismaili thinker of the Fatimid era, the Resurrection (Qiyāma) will be ushered by the Lord of the Resurrection (Qāʾim al-Qiyāma), an individual symbolizing the purpose and pinnacle of creation from among the progeny of Muhammad and his Imams. Through this individual, the world will come out of darkness and ignorance and "into the light of her Lord" (Quran 39:69). His era, unlike that of the enunciators of the divine revelation (nāṭiqs) before him, is not one where God prescribes the people to work but instead one where God rewards them. Preceding the Lord of the Resurrection (Qāʾim) is his proof (ḥujjat). The Qur'anic verse stating that "the night of power (laylat al-qadr) is better than a thousand months" (Quran 97:3) is said to refer to this proof, whose knowledge is superior to that of a thousand Imams, though their rank, collectively, is one. Hakim Nasir also recognizes the successors of the Lord of the Resurrection to be his deputies (khulafāʾ).

=== Judaism ===
In the Hebrew Bible, resurrection (Hebrew: תחיית המתים, techiyat hametim) appears only in a limited number of narrative and prophetic contexts and is not presented as a systematic doctrine. Three explicit cases describe individuals being restored to life through prophetic intervention: Elijah raises a widow’s son (1 Kings 17:17-24), Elisha revives the son of the Shunammite woman (2 Kings 4:32–37), and a dead man comes back to life upon touching Elisha’s bones (2 Kings 13:21). These episodes are portrayed as extraordinary miracles rather than as evidence of a general belief in post-mortem resurrection.

Biblical conceptions of death and the afterlife are more commonly associated with Sheol, a term referring to the realm of the dead. According to Herbert C. Brichto, writing in Reform Judaism's Hebrew Union College Annual, the family tomb is the central concept in understanding biblical views of the afterlife. Brichto states that it is "not mere sentimental respect for the physical remains that is...the motivation for the practice, but rather an assumed connection between proper sepulture and the condition of happiness of the deceased in the afterlife".

According to Brichto, the early Israelites apparently believed that the graves of family, or tribe, united into one, and that this unified collectivity is to what the Biblical Hebrew term Sheol refers, the common grave of humans. Although not well defined in the Tanakh, Sheol in this view was a subterranean underworld where the souls of the dead went after the body died. The Babylonians had a similar underworld called Aralu, and the ancient Greeks had one known as Hades. According to Brichto, other biblical names for Sheol were Abaddon "ruin", found in Psalm 88:11, Job 28:22 and Proverbs 15:11; Bor "pit", found in Isaiah 14:15, 24:22, Ezekiel 26:20; and Shakhat "corruption", found in Isaiah 38:17, Ezekiel 28:8.

During the Second Temple period, there developed a diversity of beliefs concerning the resurrection. The concept of resurrection of the physical body is found in 2 Maccabees, according to which it will happen through re-creation of the flesh. Resurrection of the dead also appears in detail in the extra-canonical Book of Enoch, 2 Baruch, and 2 Esdras. According to the British scholar in ancient Judaism Philip R. Davies, there is "little or no clear reference ... either to immortality or to resurrection from the dead" in the texts of the Dead Sea Scrolls. C.D. Elledge, however, argues that some form of resurrection may be referred to in the Dead Sea texts 4Q521, Pseudo-Ezekiel, and 4QInstruction. Too, there is the Vision of the Valley of Dry Bones in the Book of Ezekiel, and the Book of Daniel, which mentions resurrection. As Professor Devorah Dimant notes on TheTorah.com, "Originally an allegorical vision about the future return of Judeans to their land, Ezekiel's vision (ch. 37) becomes one of the cornerstones for the Jewish belief in the resurrection of the dead. ... The only biblical passage that unambiguously refers to resurrection is found in the final chapter of the book of Daniel[.]"

In medieval Jewish thought, belief in the resurrection of the dead (תחיית המתים) was formally articulated as one of the Thirteen Principles of Faith (שלושה עשר עיקרים), formulated by the philosopher and legal scholar Maimonides in the 12th century. These principles summarize core theological beliefs of Judaism, including the existence and unity of God, divine revelation, prophecy, reward and punishment, and the coming of the Messiah. The final principle explicitly affirms faith in the future resurrection of the dead, understood as a divinely ordained event in the messianic era. Maimonides’ inclusion of resurrection among these foundational principles reflects its importance in rabbinic Judaism, even as interpretations varied regarding its nature, timing, and relationship to the afterlife.

== Philosophy ==
Anastasis or Ana-stasis is a concept in contemporary philosophy emerging from the works of Jean-Luc Nancy, Divya Dwivedi and Shaj Mohan. Nancy developed the concept through his interpretation of paintings depicting the resurrection of Jesus Christ. Dwivedi and Mohan, referring to Nancy, defined Ana-stasis as coming over stasis, which is a method for philosophy to overcome its end as Martin Heidegger defined. This concept is noted to be linked in the works of Nancy, Dwivedi and Mohan to have a relation to Heidegger's "other beginning of philosophy". Kohan and Dwivdei that this "overcoming" would construct a new dimension in philosophy.

John Hick argues that the "replica theory" makes the religious doctrine of bodily resurrection somewhat plausible. For example, if a man disappears or dies in London and an exact "replica" suddenly re-appears in New York, both entities should be regarded as the same, especially if they share physical and psychological characteristics. Hick extends this theory to parallel universes, which occupy a different space to our own. He also distinguishes the theory from reincarnation, where a person lives in several successive bodies.

Theology professor Chris Jones situates early Christian understandings of resurrection within broader ancient Mediterranean views of death and renewal. He notes that the historian Josephus describes beliefs in the transformation of the soul after death. In modern scholarship and cultural analysis, resurrection is frequently interpreted as a metaphor for transformation, representing personal renewal, moral development, and communal restoration.

Other scholars reivse the replica theory with the "counterpart theory", where it is believed that God creates a resurrection counterpart to one's current body, which is new and improved. Although it is defined by one's soul and history, it is not identical to the current body, which remains destroyed after death. A useful analogy is to imagine a soul as a programme, a body as a computer and the "series of states" that a soul undergoes as a person's biography. They believe the theory has precedent in scriptures like the New Testament. In addition, it incentivizes people to care about their future.

== Technological resurrection ==
=== Cryonics ===
Cryonics is the low-temperature freezing (usually at −196 °C or −320.8 °F or 77.1 K) of a human corpse or severed head, with the hope that resurrection may be possible in the future. Cryonics is regarded with skepticism within the mainstream scientific community. It is generally viewed as a pseudoscience, and has been characterized as quackery.

=== Digital ghosts ===
In his 1988 book Mind Children, roboticist Hans Moravec proposed that a future supercomputer might be able to resurrect long-dead minds from the information that still survived. For example, such can include information in the form of memories, filmstrips, social media interactions, modeled personality traits, personal favourite things, personal notes and tasks, medical records, and genetic information.

Ray Kurzweil, American inventor and futurist, believes that when his concept of singularity comes to pass, it will be possible to resurrect the dead by digital recreation. Such is one approach in the concept of digital immortality, which could be described as resurrecting deceased as "digital ghosts" or "digital avatars". In the context of knowledge management, "virtual persona" could "aid in knowledge capture, retention, distribution, access and use" and continue to learn. Issues include post-mortem privacy, and potential use of personalised digital twins and associated systems by big data firms and advertisers.

Related alternative approaches of digital immortality include gradually "replacing" neurons in the brain with advanced medical technology (such as nanobiotechnology) as a form of mind uploading (see also: wetware computer).

=== De-extinction ===
De-extinction, enabling an organism that either resembles or is an extinct species, is also known as "resurrection biology" and often described as working on "resurrecting" dead species.

=== Medical resuscitation ===
Modern medicine can, in some cases, revive patients who "died" by some definitions of death, or were declared dead. However, under most definitions of death (brain death), this would mean that the patient wasn't truly dead.

Most advanced versions of such capabilities may include a method/system under development reported in 2019, 'BrainEx', that could partially revive (pig) brains hours after death (to the degree of brain circulation and cellular functions). It showed that "the process of cell death is a gradual, stepwise process and that some of those processes can be either postponed, preserved or even reversed". A similar organ perfusion system under development, 'OrganEx', can restore – i.e. on the cellular level – multiple vital (pig) organs one hour after death (during which the body had prolonged warm ischaemia). It could be used to preserve donor organs but may also be developed to be useful for revival in medical emergencies by buying "more time for doctors to treat people whose bodies were starved of oxygen, such as those who died from drowning or heart attacks".

There is research into what happens during and after death as well as how and to what extent patients could be revived by the use of science and technology. For example, one study showed that in the hours after humans die, "certain cells in the human brain are still active". However, it is thought that at least without any life-support-like systems, death is permanent and irreversible after several hours – not days – even in cases when revival was still possible shortly after death.

A 2010 study notes that physicians are determining death "test only for the permanent cessation of circulation and respiration because they know that irreversible cessation follows rapidly and inevitably once circulation no longer will restore itself spontaneously and will not be restored medically". Development of advanced live support measures "including cardiopulmonary resuscitation (CPR) and positive pressure ventilation (PPV)" brought the interdependence of cessation of brain function and loss of respiration and circulation and "the traditional definition of death into question" and further developments upend more "definitions of mortality".

=== Hypothetical speculations without existing technologies ===
Russian cosmist Nikolai Fyodorovich Fyodorov advocated resurrection of the dead using scientific methods. Fedorov tried to plan specific actions for scientific research of the possibility of restoring life and making it infinite. His first project is connected with collecting and synthesizing decayed remains of dead based on "knowledge and control over all atoms and molecules of the world". The second method described by Fedorov is genetic-hereditary. The revival could be done successively in the ancestral line: sons and daughters restore their fathers and mothers, they in turn restore their parents and so on. This means restoring the ancestors using the hereditary information that they passed on to their children. Using this genetic method it is only possible to create a genetic twin of the dead person. For the traditional definition of resurrection, a restoration of the deceased's personality, or their brain, would be necessary. Fedorov speculates about the idea of "radial images" that may contain the personalities of the people and survive after death. Nevertheless, Fedorov noted that even if a soul is destroyed after death, Man will learn to restore it whole by mastering the forces of decay and fragmentation.

In his 1994 book The Physics of Immortality, American physicist Frank J. Tipler, an expert on the general theory of relativity, presented his Omega Point Theory which outlines how a resurrection of the dead could take place at the end of the cosmos. He posits that humans will evolve into robots which will turn the entire cosmos into a supercomputer which will, shortly before the Big Crunch, perform the resurrection within its cyberspace, reconstructing formerly dead humans (from information captured by the supercomputer from the past light cone of the cosmos) as avatars within its metaverse.

David Deutsch, British physicist and pioneer in the field of quantum computing, formerly agreed with Tipler's Omega Point cosmology and the idea of resurrecting deceased people with the help of quantum computers but he is critical of Tipler's theological views.

Italian physicist and computer scientist Giulio Prisco presented the idea of "quantum archaeology", "reconstructing the life, thoughts, memories, and feelings of any person in the past, up to any desired level of detail, and thus resurrecting the original person via 'copying to the future'".

In their science fiction novel The Light of Other Days, Sir Arthur Clarke and Stephen Baxter imagine a future civilization resurrecting the dead of past ages by reaching into the past, through micro wormholes and with nanorobots, to download full snapshots of brain states and memories.

=== In religions ===
Both the Church of Perpetual Life and the Terasem Movement consider themselves transreligions and advocate for the use of technology to indefinitely extend the human lifespan.

== Zombies ==
A zombie (Haitian French: zombi, Haitian Creole: zonbi) is a fictional undead being created through the reanimation of a human corpse. Zombies are most commonly found in horror and fantasy genre works. The term comes from Haitian folklore, where a zombie is a dead body reanimated through various methods, most commonly magic.

== Disappearances (as distinct from resurrection) ==
As knowledge of different religions has grown, so have claims of bodily disappearance of some religious and mythological figures. In ancient Greek religion, this was a way the gods made some physically immortal, including such figures as Cleitus, Ganymede, Menelaus, and Tithonus. After his death, Cycnus was changed into a swan and vanished. In his chapter on Romulus from Parallel Lives, Plutarch criticises the continuous belief in such disappearances, referring to the allegedly miraculous disappearance of the historical figures Romulus, Cleomedes of Astypalaea, and Croesus. In ancient times, Greek and Roman pagan similarities were explained by the early Christian writers, such as Justin Martyr, as the work of demons, with the intention of leading Christians astray.

In the Buddhist Epic of King Gesar, also spelled as Geser or Kesar, at the end, chants on a mountain top and his clothes fall empty to the ground. The body of the first Guru of the Sikhs, Guru Nanak Dev, is said to have disappeared and flowers left in place of his dead body.

Lord Raglan's Hero Pattern lists many religious figures whose bodies disappear, or have more than one sepulchre. B. Traven, author of The Treasure of the Sierra Madre, wrote that the Inca Virococha arrived at Cusco (in modern-day Peru) and the Pacific seacoast where he walked across the water and vanished. It has been thought that teachings regarding the purity and incorruptibility of the hero's human body are linked to this phenomenon. Perhaps, this is also to deter the practice of disturbing and collecting the hero's remains. They are safely protected if they have disappeared.

The first such case mentioned in the Bible is that of Enoch (son of Jared, great-grandfather of Noah, and father of Methuselah). Enoch is said to have lived a life where he "walked with God", after which "he was not, for God took him" (Genesis 5:1–18). In Deuteronomy (34:6) Moses is secretly buried. Elijah vanishes in a whirlwind 2 Kings (2:11). In the Synoptic Gospels, after hundreds of years these two earlier Biblical heroes suddenly reappear, and are reportedly seen walking with Jesus, then again vanish. In the Gospel of Luke, the last time Jesus is seen (24:51) he leaves his disciples by ascending into the sky. This ascension of Jesus was a "disappearance" of sorts as recorded by Luke but was after the physical resurrection occurring several days before.

== See also ==
- 1 Corinthians 15
- Information-theoretic death
- Metempsychosis
- Near death experience
- Necromancy
- Riverworld
- Suspended animation
- Undead
- Eschatology – Conceptions of the end of the present age
