= Digital cloning =

Artificial intelligence technology

Digital cloning is an emerging technology, that involves deep-learning algorithms, which allows one to manipulate currently existing audio, photos, and videos that are hyper-realistic. One of the impacts of such technology is that hyper-realistic videos and photos makes it difficult for the human eye to distinguish what is real and what is fake. Furthermore, with various companies making such technologies available to the public, they can bring various benefits as well as potential legal and ethical concerns.

Digital cloning can be categorized into audio-visual (AV), memory, personality, and consumer behaviour cloning. In AV cloning, the creation of a cloned digital version of the digital or non-digital original can be used, for example, to create a fake image, an avatar, or a fake video or audio of a person that cannot be easily differentiated from the real person it is purported to represent. A memory and personality clone like a mindclone is essentially a digital copy of a person's mind. A consumer behavior clone is a profile or cluster of customers based on demographics.

Truby and Brown coined the term "digital thought clone" to refer to the evolution of digital cloning into a more advanced personalized digital clone that consists of "a replica of all known data and behavior on a specific living person, recording in real-time their choices, preferences, behavioral trends, and decision making processes."

Digital cloning first became popular in the entertainment industry. The idea of digital clones originated from movie companies creating virtual actors of actors who have died. When actors die during a movie production, a digital clone of the actor can be synthesized using past footage, photos, and voice recordings to mimic the real person in order to continue the movie production.

Modern artificial intelligence, has allowed for the creation of deepfakes. This involves manipulation of a video to the point where the person depicted in the video is saying or performing actions he or she may not have consented to. In April 2018, BuzzFeed released a deepfake video of Jordan Peele, which was manipulated to depict former president Barack Obama making statements he has previously not made in public to warn the public against the potential dangers of deepfakes.

In addition to deepfakes, companies such as Intellitar now allows one to easily create a digital clone of themselves by feeding a series of images and voice recordings. This essentially creates digital immortality, allowing loved ones to interact with representations of those who died. Digital cloning not only allows one to digitally memorialize their loved ones, but they can also be used to create representations of historical figures and be used in an educational setting.

With the development of various technology, as mentioned above, there are numerous concerns that arises, including identity theft, data breaches, and other ethical concerns. One of the issues with digital cloning is that there are little to no legislations to protect potential victims against these possible problems.

== Technology ==
=== Intelligent Avatar Platforms (IAP) ===
Intelligent Avatar Platform (IAP) can be defined as an online platform supported by artificial intelligence that allows one to create a clone of themselves. The individual must train his or her clone to act and speak like themselves by feeding the algorithm numerous voice recordings and videos of themselves. Essentially, the platforms are marketed as a place where one 'lives eternally', as they are able to interact with other avatars on the same platform. IAP is becoming a platform for one to attain digital immortality, along with maintaining a family tree and legacy for generations following to see.

Some examples of IAP include Intellitar and Eterni.me. Although most of these companies are still in its developing stages, they all are trying to achieve the same goal of allowing the user to create an exact duplicate of themselves to store every memory they have in their mind into the cyberspace. Some include a free version, which only allows the user to choose their avatar from a given set of images and audio. However, with the premium setting, these companies will ask the user to upload photos, videos, and audio recordings of one to form a realistic version of themselves. Additionally, to ensure that the clone is as close to the original person, companies also encourage interacting with their own clone by chatting and answering questions for them. This allows the algorithm to learn the cognition of the original person and apply that to the clone. Intellitar closed down in 2012 because of intellectual property battles over the technology it used.

Potential concerns with IAP includes the potential data breaches and not getting consent of the deceased. IAP must have a strong foundation and responsibility against data breaches and hacking in order to protect personal information of the dead, which can include voice recording, photos, and messages. In addition to the risk of personal privacy being compromised, there is also the risk of violating the privacy of the deceased. Although one can give consent to creating a digital clone of themselves before his or her physical death, they are unable to give consent to the actions the digital clone may take.

=== Deepfakes ===
Deepfakes are videos manipulated to portray the people depicted saying or doing things that they, in reality, did not. A person can feed images, videos and voice recordings of a person into an artificial intelligence application in order to create a deepfake. The public gained access to deepfake technology in 2018, with the release of FakeApp, which would be used to create a BuzzFeed video of former President Barack Obama. The film and advertising industries can cut the cost of hiring actors or models by instead creating deepfakes of them. Deepfakes have been created for malicious reasons, such as to act as revenge porn or to fabricate statements from public officials.

=== Voice cloning ===
Voice cloning is a case of the audio deepfake methods that uses artificial intelligence to generate a clone of a person's voice. Voice cloning involves deep learning algorithm that takes in voice recordings of an individual and can synthesize such a voice to the point where it can faithfully replicate a human voice with great accuracy of tone and likeness.

Cloning a voice requires high-performance computers. Usually, the computations are done using the Graphics Processing Unit (GPU), and very often resort to the cloud computing, due to the enormous amount of calculation needed.

Audio data for training has to be fed into an artificial intelligence model. These are often original recordings that provide an example of the voice of the person concerned. Artificial intelligence can use this data to create an authentic voice, which can reproduce whatever is typed, called Text-To-Speech, or spoken, called Speech-To-Speech.

This technology worries many because of its impact on various issues, from political discourse to the rule of law. Some of the early warning signs have already appeared in the form of phone scams and fake videos on social media of people doing things they never did.

Protections against these threats can be primarily implemented in two ways. The first is to create a way to analyze or detect the authenticity of a video. This approach will inevitably be an upside game as ever-evolving generators defeat these detectors. The second way could be to embed the creation and modification information in software or hardware. This would work only if the data were not editable, but the idea would be to create an inaudible watermark that would act as a source of truth. In other words, we could know if the video is authentic by seeing where it was shot, produced, edited, and so on.

15.ai—a non-commercial freeware web application that began as a proof of concept of the democratization of voice acting and dubbing using technology—gives the public access to such technology. Its gratis and non-commercial nature (with the only stipulation being that the project be properly credited when used), ease of use, and substantial improvements to current text-to-speech implementations have been lauded by users; however, some critics and voice actors have questioned the legality and ethicality of leaving such technology publicly available and readily accessible.

Although this application is still in the developmental stage, big technology corporations, such as Google and Amazon are investing vast amounts of money for the development.

Some of the positive uses of voice cloning include the ability to synthesize millions of audiobooks without the use of human labor. Also, voice cloning was used to translate podcast content into different languages using the podcaster's voice. Another includes those who may have lost their voice can gain back a sense of individuality by creating their voice clone by inputting recordings of them speaking before they lost their voices.

On the other hand, voice cloning is also susceptible to misuse. An example of this is the voices of celebrities and public officials being cloned, and the voice may say something to provoke conflict despite the actual person has no association with what their voice said.

In recognition of the threat that voice cloning poses to privacy, civility, and democratic processes, the Institutions, including the Federal Trade Commission, U.S. Department of Justice and Defense Advanced Research Projects Agency (DARPA) and the Italian Ministry of Education, University and Research (MIUR), have weighed in on various audio deepfake use cases and methods that might be used to combat them.

== Constructive uses ==
=== Education ===
Digital cloning can be useful in an educational setting to create a more immersive experience for students. Some students may learn better through a more interactive experience and creating deepfakes can enhance the learning ability of students. One example of this includes creating a digital clone of historical figures, such as Abraham Lincoln, to show what problems he faced during his life and how he was able to overcome them. Another example of using digital clones in an educational setting is having speakers create a digital clone of themselves. Various advocacy groups may have trouble with schedules as they are touring various schools during the year. However, by creating digital clones of themselves, their clones can present the topic at places where the group could not physically make it. These educational benefits can bring students a new way of learning as well as giving access to those who previously were not able to access resources due to environmental conditions.

=== Arts ===
Although digital cloning has already been in the entertainment and arts industry for a while, artificial intelligence can greatly expand the uses of these technology in the industry. The movie-industry can create even more hyper-realistic actors and actresses who have died. Additionally, movie-industry can also create digital clones in movie scenes that may require extras, which can help cut the cost of production immensely. However, digital cloning and other technology can be beneficial for non-commercial purposes. For example, artists can be more expressive if they are looking to synthesize avatars to be part of their video production. They can also create digital avatars to draft up their work and help formulate their ideas before moving on working on the final work. Actor Val Kilmer lost his voice in 2014 after a tracheotomy due to his throat cancer. However, he partnered with an AI company that produced a synthetic voice based on his previous recordings. The voice enabled Kilmer to retake his "Iceman" role from 1986 Top Gun in the 2022 sequel film Top Gun: Maverick.

=== Digital immortality ===
Although digital immortality has existed for a while as social media accounts of the deceased continue to remain in cyberspace, creating a virtual clone that is immortal takes on a new meaning. With the creation of a digital clone, one can not only capture the visual presence of themselves but also their mannerism, including personality and cognition. With digital immortality, one can continue to interact with a representation of their loved ones after they have died. Furthermore, families can connect with the representations of multiple generations, forming a family tree, in a sense, to pass on the family legacy to future generations, providing a way for history to be passed down.

== Concerns ==
=== Fake news ===
With a lack of regulations for deepfakes, there are several concerns that have arisen. Some concerning deepfake videos that can bring potential harm includes depiction of political officials displaying inappropriate behavior, police officers shown as shooting unarmed black men, and soldiers murdering innocent civilians may begin to appear although it may have never occurred in real life. With such hyper-realistic videos being released on the Internet, it becomes very easy for the public to be misinformed, which could lead people to take actions, thus contributing to this vicious cycle of unnecessary harm. Additionally, with the rise in fake news in recent news, there is also the possibility of combining deepfakes and fake news. This will bring further difficulty to distinguishing what is real and what is fake. Visual information can be very convincing to the human eyes, therefore, the combination of deepfakes and fake news can have a detrimental effect on society. Strict regulations should be made by social media companies and other platforms for news.

=== Personal use ===
Another reason deepfakes can be used maliciously is for one to sabotage another on a personal level. With the increased accessibility of technologies to create deepfakes, blackmailers and thieves are able to easily extract personal information for financial gains and other reasons by creating videos of loved ones of the victim asking for help. Furthermore, voice cloning can be used maliciously for criminals to make fake phone calls to victims. The phone calls will have the exact voice and mannerism as the individual, which can trick the victim into giving private information to the criminal without knowing. Alternatively, a bad actor could, for example, create a deepfake of a person superimposed onto a video to extract blackmail payment and/or as an act of revenge porn.

Creating deepfakes and voice clones for personal use can be extremely difficult under the law because there is no commercial harm. Rather, they often come in the form of psychological and emotional damage, making it difficult for the court to provide a remedy for.

=== Ethical implications ===
Although there are numerous legal problems that arises with the development of such technology, there are also ethical problems that may not be protected under the current legislations. One of the biggest problems that comes with the use of deepfakes and voice cloning is the potential of identity theft. However, identity theft in terms of deepfakes are difficult to prosecute because there are currently no laws that are specific to deepfakes. Furthermore, the damages that malicious use of deepfakes can bring is more of a psychological and emotional one rather than a financial one, which makes it more difficult to provide a remedy for. Allen argues that the way one's privacy should be treated is similar to Kant's categorical imperative.

Another ethical implication is the use of private and personal information one must give up to use the technology. Because digital cloning, deepfakes, and voice cloning all use a deep-learning algorithm, the more information the algorithm receives, the better the results are. However, every platform has a risk of data breach, which could potentially lead to very personal information being accessed by groups that users never consented to. Furthermore, post-mortem privacy comes into question when family members of a loved one tries to gather as much information as possible to create a digital clone of the deceased without the permission of how much information they are willing to give up.

== Existing laws in the United States ==
=== Copyright laws ===
In the United States, copyright laws require some type of originality and creativity in order to protect the author's individuality. However, creating a digital clone simply means taking personal data, such as photos, voice recordings, and other information in order to create a virtual person that is as close to the actual person. In the decision of Supreme Court case Feist Publications Inc. v. Rural Television Services Company, Inc., Justice O'Connor emphasized the importance of originality and some degree of creativity. However, the extent of originality and creativity is not clearly defined, creating a gray area for copyright laws. Creating digital clones require not only the data of the person but also the creator's input of how the digital clone should act or move. In Meshwerks v. Toyota, this question was raised and the court stated that the same copyright laws created for photography should be applied to digital clones.

=== Right of publicity ===
With the current lack of legislations to protect individuals against potential malicious use of digital cloning, the right of publicity may be the best way to protect one in a legal setting. The right of publicity, also referred to as personality rights, gives autonomy to the individual when it comes to controlling their own voice, appearance, and other aspects that essentially makes up their personality in a commercial setting. If a deepfake video or digital clone of one arises without their consent, depicting the individual taking actions or making statements that are out of their personality, they can take legal actions by claiming that it is violating their right to publicity. Although the right to publicity specifically states that it is meant to protect the image of an individual in a commercial setting, which requires some type of profit, some state that the legislation may be updated to protect virtually anyone's image and personality. Another important note is that the right of publicity is only implemented in specific states, so some states may have different interpretations of the right compared to other states.

== Preventative measures ==
=== Regulation ===
Digital and digital thought clones raise legal issues relating to data privacy, informed consent, anti-discrimination, copyright, and right of publicity. More jurisdictions urgently need to enact legislation similar to the General Data Protection Regulation in Europe to protect people against unscrupulous and harmful uses of their data and the unauthorised development and use of digital thought clones.

=== Technology ===
One way to prevent being a victim to any of the technology mentioned above is to develop artificial intelligence against these algorithms. There are already several companies that have developed artificial intelligence that can detect manipulated images by looking at the patterns in each pixel. By applying a similar logic, they are trying to create a software that takes each frame of a given video and analyze it pixel by pixel in order to find the pattern of the original video and determine whether or not it has been manipulated.

In addition to developing new technology that can detect any video manipulations, many researchers are raising the importance for private corporations creating stricter guidelines to protect individual privacy. With the development of artificial intelligence, it is necessary to ask how this impacts society today as it begins to appear in virtually every aspect of society, including medicine, education, politics, and the economy. Furthermore, artificial intelligence will begin to appear in various aspects of society, which makes it important to have laws that protect humans rights as technology takes over. As the private sector gains more digital power over the public, it is important to set strict regulations and laws to prevent private corporations from using personal data maliciously. Additionally, the past history of various data breaches and violations of privacy policy should also be a warning for how personal information can be accessed and used without the person's consent.

=== Digital literacy ===
Another way to prevent being harmed by these technology is by educating people on the pros and cons of digital cloning. By doing so, it empowers each individual to make a rational decision based on their own circumstances. Furthermore, it is also important to educate people on how to protect the information they put out on the Internet. By increasing the digital literacy of the public, people have a greater chance of determining whether a given video has been manipulated as they can be more skeptical of the information they find online.

== See also ==
- Artificial intelligence
- Deepfake
- Deep learning
- Digital media
- Post-mortem privacy
- Virtual actor
- Virtual human – Computer simulation of a person
