= Post-mortem privacy =

Ability to control the dissemination of personal information after death

Post-mortem privacy is a person's ability to control the dissemination of personal information after death. An individual's reputation and dignity after death is also subject to post-mortem privacy protections. In the US, no federal laws specifically extend post-mortem privacy protection. At the state level, privacy laws pertaining to the deceased vary significantly, but in general do not extend any clear rights of privacy beyond property rights. The relative lack of acknowledgment of post-mortem privacy rights has sparked controversy, as rapid technological advancements have resulted in increased amounts of personal information stored and shared online.

== Law ==
=== European Union ===
Neither primary law of the European Union, including the Charter of Fundamental Rights of the European Union, nor secondary legislation, most notably Regulation (EU) 2016/679 (General Data Protection Regulation), provides for the protection of privacy and personal data post-mortem. Similarly, the European Convention on Human Rights, as well as the jurisprudence of both the Court of Justice of the European Union and the European Court of Human Rights, do not recognize or establish a right to data protection for deceased individuals within the legal framework of the European Union.

=== United States ===
Under common law, the right to privacy is considered a personal right, meaning it applies only to the living and, consequently, does not recognize the privacy interests of the deceased. Because of this, defamation and privacy torts that are used to prevent unjust damage to individuals' reputations cannot be extended post-mortem. For example, a family cannot file suit for invasion of privacy on behalf of a deceased relative as a personal right; it can only be exerted by the person whose rights are being infringed upon. In addition, the deceased do not qualify for privacy protections held in constitutional and statutory rights, such as those noted in the Fourth and Fourteenth Amendments. Judicial justification for the termination of privacy rights at death is centered on two main points: firstly, the deceased can no longer be active agents, and secondly, the deceased are incapable of being harmed by invasion of privacy or defamation. The only clear extension of postmortem privacy rights under federal law are those pertaining to property. Via Will, private property and some personal information can be passed on to heirs in accordance with the decedent's wishes.

Most post-mortem privacy protection occurs on the state level. Thus, legislation and the degree of protection varies widely from state to state.

=== Relevant court cases ===
Jesse James Jr. v. Screen Gems Inc. established that rights of privacy do not survive death. The widow of Jesse James Jr. filed suit against Screen Gems on behalf of her late husband, claiming the use of his name in a documentary was an invasion of his privacy. The court decided her claim was insufficient because it only applied to her husband.

== Medical confidentiality ==
Medical confidentiality is upheld through both state and federal law. Because state legislation varies considerably, Congress passed explicit medical privacy regulations in 2000 under the Health Insurance Portability and Accountability Act (HIPAA), which protects individual's personally identifiable health information for 50 years after death. Howeover, no legal mandate exists regarding patients' wishes after death. During life, informed consent is the basis for managing patient medical history, but since informed consent is no longer possible post-mortem, confidential medical information is at risk of being exploited in a number of ways. First, highly sensitive information, such as genetic information, potential health factors, or diseases, can be easily disseminated in a way the patient may not have wanted. In addition, legal consent for research on a patient's biological material no longer applies to deceased individuals, allowing such research to be conducted on deceased patients without requiring permission.

The dissemination of autopsy records has become a significant issue in recent years. State legislation dictating the dissemination of autopsy records can be characterized into three groups: those prioritizing confidentiality, those prioritizing complete transparency, and a middle ground that limits some aspects of disclosure for privacy protection. The inconsistencies surrounding this legislation also have the potential to expose very personal medical information that can also affect the living relatives of a patient. For example, certain genetic diseases that the patient's family does not want known to the public could be exposed, which can lead to raising health insurance premiums and employment difficulties.

In England and Wales, and under the European Convention of Human Rights, medical confidentiality survives the death of the patient.

=== Case of Henrietta Lacks ===
Henrietta Lacks was an African-American woman whose cells were removed without consent while receiving cancer treatment. Her cells became the source of the foundational HeLa cell line in the scientific world today. Lacks and her family were neither informed nor asked for consent to the use of her cells for this research. It was not until the 1980s when Lacks's medical records were made public, exposing the rest of her family's medical information as well as the fact that her family was never informed of this. The major issue surrounding the Lacks case is twofold. Firstly, at no point was consent sought for the extraction and research on Lacks's cells. Secondly, her family never received compensation for the commercial use of the HeLa cell line.

== Medical research ==
The lack of biobank policies and consent forms has led to uncertainty about the post-mortem use of data for medical research. However, studies show that acceptability of post-mortem use of data for medical research was high among research participants and their relatives.

== Autopsy and death scene photographs ==
Under the Due Process Clause, family members generally maintain the right to control dissemination of photos of deceased relatives. Privacy rights in this context only extend to the privacy of the living relatives of the decedent, not the actual deceased. Most court rulings regarding autopsy and death scene photos have looked to the precedent set by the federal Freedom of Information Act (FOIA), which determines under which circumstances the release of such images is appropriate and not invasive of any living person's privacy.

=== Case of Emmett Till ===
While most families wish to conceal the images of their deceased loved ones, Mamie Till Bradley, mother of Emmett Till, decided to make the photos of her brutally murdered son public in spite of officials' attempts to ignore the event. The photos exposed the horrendous realities of racial injustice in America and became a rallying call for many influential civil rights figures, including Martin Luther King Jr. and Muhammad Ali. Moreover, the images forced all Americans to confront the deep-rooted racism in America despite many white Americans’ attempts to remain ignorant to the despicable happenings, especially in the South.

=== Relevant court cases ===
In New York Times Company v. NASA, the D.C. District Court denied the New York Times' request under the Freedom of Information Act (FOIA) for access to audio recordings of the astronauts involved in the Challenger explosion moments before the event. The major argument of the case came down to weighing public interest and the decedents' families, and the court ruled in favor of protecting the decedents' families, claiming that exposing the tapes could cause relatives of the astronauts trauma.

National Archives and Records Administration v. Favish similarly found that under FOIA, the privacy rights of a decedents' relatives are both acknowledged and prioritized when disseminating autopsy/death scene photos of the deceased. This decision was made in regards to the death scene photos of Vincent Foster, a deputy counsel to Bill Clinton.

Marsh v. County of San Diego determined that a prosecutor who photocopied and then released an autopsy photo of a deceased child after his retirement could not be sued under the Doctrine of Qualified Immunity. A major point in the case was whether or not Brenda Marsh had the legal right to control the dissemination of her son's autopsy photos, and though the court determined that she did, it ruled on a technicality that at the time of the events, the law had not yet been "clearly established."

== Digital assets ==
Following the rise of the World Wide Web, large amounts of data have been stored in online accounts. Because of the relative newness of this phenomenon, no legal mandate exists for how a person's digital assets are to be handled after death. Terms of Service Agreements between the user and the service provider remain the closest variant to this available. In order to maintain their users' privacy protection, many of these agreements make it very difficult for third parties to access such online accounts once the user has died. Yahoo!, for example, states in its terms of service agreement that the account will be permanently deleted upon the user's death. Google requires a lengthy process that involves getting a court order to obtain content from a deceased user's account. There is also an option to allow someone to manage the account, make it inactive, or delete it altogether once the user has died. Facebook has allowed for the memorialization of deceased users' accounts, which aims to maintain the privacy of the user while allowing friends and family to still interact with the account. Requesting information from the account is a long and difficult process. The company also allows for "legacy contact," wherein the user can appoint someone to take over their account once they die. The new policy also offers the option for the account to be permanently deleted upon death.

The rigid policies of service providers have become increasingly problematic as online transactions and data storage have become more popular, and personal representatives have consequently found an increasing need to access online accounts in order to carry out estate transfers and Will orders. States began proposing legislation to address this problem in the early 2000s, and legislation favoring access to decedents' accounts became overwhelmingly supported. Delaware's Access to Digital Assets Act is an example of such legislation already passed at the state level, which grants family members of deceased individuals full access to online accounts and profiles. However, stringent terms of service agreements by service providers still make access to accounts very difficult in most cases. Thus, two major contemporary legislative proposals have come forth to address the issue. In July 2014, the Uniform Law Commission (ULC) proposed the Uniform Fiduciary Access to Digital Assets Act (UFADAA) to provide fiduciaries easy access to the digital accounts of their deceased clients. Twenty-six states proposed legislation based on the UFADAA; however, such legislation failed in all but one state. In response to this, NetChoice, a major rival to ULC, proposed the Privacy Expectation Afterlife Choices Act (PEAC), which included much more stringent guidelines for giving fiduciaries access to digital accounts and was overall considered to be much more privacy-centric. Only four states had proposed PEAC legislation in 2014, and only Virginia actually implemented it in 2015. Shortly after passing the UFADAA, the ULC passed a revised version (RUFADAA). This new legislative proposal incorporated more privacy centered aspects that aligned more with those of PEAC, which even gained it the support of NetChoice. Moreover, thirty-one states proposed legislation in accordance with the RUFADAA. However, critics of the new legislation contest that its transformation still not does give much consideration to a decedent's post-mortem privacy of the information kept in their account. Google announced in 2020 that they will delete photos and cloud files after two years of inactivity.

== Celebrity images and persona ==
=== Post-mortem publicity rights ===
The right of publicity was created as an extension of the right of privacy. It was developed with the intent to provided unique privacy rights to celebrities or anyone whose persona or name had commercial value. Because these people are constantly in the public eye, general rights of privacy are oftentimes not applicable, thus publicity rights accommodate this situation. The right of publicity essentially grants a person the right to control the portrayal of themselves in the public eye, specifically in regard to commercial use. Copyright laws, aimed at protecting the ownership rights of original works, contain a significant amount of overlap with publicity rights. Much like post-mortem privacy rights, no blatant federal rights of publicity have been established, leaving recognition up to individual states. Whether states have laws regarding post-mortem publicity is dependent upon whether the state classifies the right as a privacy right or a property right. If classified as a personal right, states will not recognize post-mortem rights of publicity due to the stipulation that personal rights only apply to the living. If classified as a property right, then the upkeep and transfer of publicity rights follow a similar tract as that of property. Most states acknowledge a specific duration for post-mortem publicity rights, which generally range between forty and one hundred years. Because post-mortem publicity rights vary from state to state, court precedent has determined that when establishing a person's post-mortem publicity rights, the legislation of the state in which the decedent lived must be adhered to.

=== Relevant court cases ===
Haelan Laboratories, Inc. v. Topps Chewing Gum, Inc. established the right of publicity, granting individuals control of the commercial use of their identity.

Shaw Family Archives Ltd. v. CMG Worldwide, Inc. determined that Marilyn Monroe's estate did not own her post-mortem right of publicity because neither state of her residency, New York nor California, recognized post-mortem rights of publicity.

In Experience Hendrix v. HendrixLicensing.com, Al Hendrix, despite being his son's sole heir, was denied the acquisition of Jimi Hendrix's publicity rights due to the fact that New York, at the time, did not acknowledge post-mortem publicity rights.

=== Controversy ===
The use of deceased celebrities' likenesses has sparked controversy, mainly regarding the potential for their image to be used in a way that is inconsistent with that celebrity's desire. This can occur through the use of a celebrity's image for advertising a product, service, or any other recreation of celebrity likeness for commercial, or noncommercial, use in a way that the celebrity would otherwise not agree to during their lifetime. This then raises questions about a potential violation of that celebrity's privacy because of the use of an individual's image without their consent. This can be seen in the 2012 Coachella concert, which featured a digital recreation of Tupac Shakur. The virtual clone performed on stage, rapping a song never recorded by Tupac during his life. The use of such digital cloning and other similar recreations of celebrities could become a serious privacy concern in that those being reproduced have no control over how they are being represented. Discretion regarding the use of such digital personas is entirely up to whoever owns the right to that celebrity's image, which inevitably opens up the possibility that the decedent's interest is not being prioritized.
