= Dionysus in comparative mythology =

Dionysus, the god of wine, theatre, and ecstasy in ancient Greek religion, has been compared to many other deities, both by his classical worshippers and later scholars. These deities include figures outside of ancient Greek religion, such as Jesus, Osiris, Shiva, and Tammuz, as well as figures inside of ancient Greek religion, such as Hades.

== Within the Greek Pantheon ==
=== Adonis ===
In Plutarch's symposiacs, it is stated that there are those who believe Adonis to be the same as Dionysus, however, Plutarch acknowledges that there are others who hold them to be lovers.

== Outside of the Greek Pantheon ==
=== Abrahamic ===
==== Jesus Christ ====
Comparisons have been made between Jesus Christ and Dionysus since ancient times. Justin the Martyr, in his First Apology, notes the parallels between the cult of Dionysus and the cult of Christ, through their use of wine, donkeys, death, and resurrection.

=== Egyptian ===
==== Osiris ====
In his Histories, Herodotus says that many believe that Osiris is the Egyptian form of Dionysus.
