= Tryggve Mettinger =

Swedish professor of Hebrew Bible, retired

Tryggve Mettinger (8 June 1940 in Helsingborg – 23 October 2023) was a professor of Hebrew Bible, at Lund University, Sweden, where he taught from 1978 to 2003.

== Life and work ==
Between 1960 and 1978, Mettinger studied various subjects, such as Semitics, Egyptology, Assyriology, and Comparative Literature, at the Universities of Lund and Copenhagen. He later earned his doctorate in 1971, worked as docent (Reader) of Old Testament exegesis, and subsequently was appointed professor at Lund University, a capacity in which he served until his retirement in 2003. He had visiting professor positions in the U.S., Israel, the Netherlands, and South Africa. He was awarded the Thuréus prize (humanities) 2008 by the Kungl. Vetenskaps-Societeten in Uppsala. Between 1978 and 2003, he was one of the editors of the monograph series Coniectanea Biblica, Old Testament Series. Mettinger served as an expert consultant for the official Swedish Bible translation committee, whose work led to the creation of the Bibel 2000 translation. He was a member of various learned societies, such as the Royal Swedish Academy of Letters, History and Antiquities, Stockholm and the (British) Society for Old Testament Study (honorary member). He had also been a guest lecturer at many universities and delivered papers at many conferences devoted to Old Testament study, Assyriology and Comparative Religion. He described his epistemological attitude towards studying religious texts using the following words: "I try to draw a line [of demarcation] between what I believe I know as a scholar and what I know I believe as a Christian."

In 2011, the Festschrift Enigmas and Images was published in his honor. That volume also includes an almost complete bibliography of Mettinger's publications up to that point. Previously, another Festschrift dedicated to him was also published as a volume of Svensk Exegetisk Årsbok. In 2015, a volume collecting a number of his scholarly essays was published by Eisenbrauns under the title Reports from a Scholar's Life; the book also includes an English language version of Mettinger's farewell lecture when leaving his professorship at Lund University (a lecture that has given the book its title) — summarizing much of his scholarly career. The lecture can also be read online.

== Publications ==
- Solomonic State Officials. A Study of the Civil Government Officials of the Israelite Monarchy (1971)
- King and Messiah. The Civil and Sacral Legitimation of the Israelite Kings(1976)
- The Dethronement of Sabaoth: Studies in the Shem and Kabod Theologies by Tryggve Mettinger (1982)
- A Farewell to the Servant Songs. A Critical Examination of an Exegetical Axiom (1983)
- Eva och revbenet. Sex uppsatser om Gamla Testamentet
- No Graven Image? Israelite Aniconism in Its Ancient Near Eastern Context (1995)
- The riddle of resurrection by Tryggve N. D. Mettinger (2001) ISBN 9122019456
- In Search of God: The Meaning and Message of the Everlasting Names by Tryggve Mettinger, translated by Frederick H. Cryer (Jul 15, 2005) ISBN 0800637402
- The Eden Narrative: A literary and religio-historical study of Genesis 2-3, Winona Lake, IN (2007)
- I begynnelsen. Hur skall vi förstå Bibelns tre första kapitel? Aspekter från astrofysik och exegetik(2011)
- Reports from a Scholar’s Life. Select Papers on the Hebrew Bible. Edited by Andrew Knapp (2015; collected essays).
- Sångernas Sång. En mästares dikt om kärleken (2016)

Festschrift: Göran Eidevall and Blazenka Scheuer (ed.), Enigmas and Images. Studies in Honor of Tryggve N.D. Mettinger (2011)
